= Maryland's congressional delegations =

Maryland's congressional districts since 2023

These are tables of congressional delegations from Maryland in the United States House of Representatives and the United States Senate.

The current dean of the Maryland delegation is Representative and former House Majority Leader Steny Hoyer (MD-5), having served in the House since 1981.

== U.S. House of Representatives ==
=== Current members ===
List of members, their terms in office, district boundaries, and the district political ratings according to the CPVI. The delegation has 8 members: 7 Democrats and 1 Republican.

Current U.S. representatives from Maryland
| District | Member (Residence) | Party | Incumbent since | CPVI (2025) | District map |
|---|---|---|---|---|---|
| 1st | Andy Harris (Cambridge) | Republican | January 3, 2011 | R+8 | |
| 2nd | Johnny Olszewski (Sparrows Point) | Democratic | January 3, 2025 | D+10 | |
| 3rd | Sarah Elfreth (Annapolis) | Democratic | January 3, 2025 | D+12 | |
| 4th | Glenn Ivey (Cheverly) | Democratic | January 3, 2023 | D+39 | |
| 5th | Steny Hoyer (Mechanicsville) | Democratic | May 19, 1981 | D+17 | |
| 6th | April McClain Delaney (Potomac) | Democratic | January 3, 2025 | D+3 | |
| 7th | Kweisi Mfume (Baltimore) | Democratic | May 5, 2020 | D+31 | |
| 8th | Jamie Raskin (Takoma Park) | Democratic | January 3, 2017 | D+30 | |

=== 1789–1793: Six seats ===
| Congress | 1st district | 2nd district | 3rd district | 4th district | 5th district | 6th district |
|---|---|---|---|---|---|---|
| 1st (1789–1791) | Michael Jenifer; Stone (AA) | Joshua Seney (AA) | Benjamin Contee (AA) | William Smith (AA) | George Gale (PA) | Daniel Carroll (PA) |
| 2nd (1791–1793) | Philip Key (C/PA) | Joshua Seney (C/AA) | William Pinkney (C/PA) | Samuel Sterett (C/AA) | William Vans; Murray (C/PA) | Upton; Sheredine (C/AA) |
| 2nd (1791–1793) | Philip Key (C/PA) | William Hindman (PA) | John Francis Mercer (AA) | Samuel Sterett (C/AA) | William Vans; Murray (C/PA) | Upton; Sheredine (C/AA) |

=== 1793–1803: Eight seats ===
Maryland gained two representatives, up to eight.

| Congress | 1st district | 2nd district | 3rd district | 4th district | 5th district | 6th district | 7th district | 8th district |
|---|---|---|---|---|---|---|---|---|
| 3rd (1793–1795) | George Dent (PA) | John Francis; Mercer (AA) | Uriah Forrest (PA) | Thomas Sprigg (AA) | Samuel Smith (AA) | Gabriel Christie (AA) | William Hindman (PA) | William Vans; Murray (PA) |
| 3rd (1793–1795) | George Dent (PA) | Gabriel Duvall (AA) | Benjamin Edwards (PA) | Thomas Sprigg (AA) | Samuel Smith (AA) | Gabriel Christie (AA) | William Hindman (PA) | William Vans; Murray (PA) |
| 4th (1795–1797) | George Dent (F) | Gabriel Duvall (DR) | Jeremiah Crabb (F) | Thomas Sprigg (DR) | Samuel Smith (DR) | Gabriel Christie (DR) | William Hindman (F) | William Vans; Murray (F) |
| 4th (1795–1797) | George Dent (F) | Richard Sprigg Jr. (DR) | William Craik (F) | Thomas Sprigg (DR) | Samuel Smith (DR) | Gabriel Christie (DR) | William Hindman (F) | William Vans; Murray (F) |
| 5th (1797–1799) | George Dent (F) | Richard Sprigg Jr. (DR) | William Craik (F) | George Baer Jr. (F) | Samuel Smith (DR) | William Matthews (F) | William Hindman (F) | John Dennis (F) |
| 6th (1799–1801) | George Dent (F) | John Chew Thomas (F) | William Craik (F) | George Baer Jr. (F) | Samuel Smith (DR) | Gabriel Christie (DR) | Joseph Hopper; Nicholson (DR) | John Dennis (F) |
| 7th (1801–1803) | John Campbell (F) | Richard Sprigg Jr. (DR) | Thomas Plater (DR) | Daniel Hiester (DR) | Samuel Smith (DR) | John Archer (DR) | Joseph Hopper; Nicholson (DR) | John Dennis (F) |
| 7th (1801–1803) | John Campbell (F) | Walter Bowie (DR) | Thomas Plater (DR) | Daniel Hiester (DR) | Samuel Smith (DR) | John Archer (DR) | Joseph Hopper; Nicholson (DR) | John Dennis (F) |

=== 1803–1833: Nine seats ===
Maryland gained one representative, up to nine. The fifth district had two representatives: one from Baltimore City, and the other from Baltimore County, Maryland.

| Congress | 1st district | 2nd district | 3rd district | 4th district | 5th district | | 6th district | 7th district | 8th district |
| Congress | 1st district | 2nd district | 3rd district | 4th district | Seat A | Seat B | 6th district | 7th district | 8th district |
|---|---|---|---|---|---|---|---|---|---|
| 8th (1803–1805) | John Campbell (F) | Walter Bowie (DR) | Thomas Plater (DR) | Daniel Hiester (DR) | William McCreery (DR) | Nicholas R. Moore (DR) | John Archer (DR) | Joseph Hopper; Nicholson (DR) | John Dennis (F) |
| 8th (1803–1805) | John Campbell (F) | Walter Bowie (DR) | Thomas Plater (DR) | Roger Nelson (DR) | William McCreery (DR) | Nicholas R. Moore (DR) | John Archer (DR) | Joseph Hopper; Nicholson (DR) | John Dennis (F) |
| 9th (1805–1807) | John Campbell (F) | Leonard Covington (DR) | Patrick Magruder (DR) | Roger Nelson (DR) | William McCreery (DR) | Nicholas R. Moore (DR) | John Archer (DR) | Joseph Hopper; Nicholson (DR) | Charles; Goldsborough (F) |
| 9th (1805–1807) | John Campbell (F) | Leonard Covington (DR) | Patrick Magruder (DR) | Roger Nelson (DR) | William McCreery (DR) | Nicholas R. Moore (DR) | John Archer (DR) | Edward Lloyd (DR) | Charles; Goldsborough (F) |
| 10th (1807–1809) | John Campbell (F) | Archibald Van; Horne (DR) | Philip Barton; Key (F) | Roger Nelson (DR) | William McCreery (DR) | Nicholas R. Moore (DR) | John Montgomery (DR) | Edward Lloyd (DR) | Charles; Goldsborough (F) |
| 11th (1809–1811) | John Campbell (F) | Archibald Van; Horne (DR) | Philip Barton; Key (F) | Roger Nelson (DR) | Alexander McKim (DR) | Nicholas R. Moore (DR) | John Montgomery (DR) | John Brown (DR) | Charles; Goldsborough (F) |
| 11th (1809–1811) | John Campbell (F) | Archibald Van; Horne (DR) | Philip Barton; Key (F) | Samuel Ringgold (DR) | Alexander McKim (DR) | Nicholas R. Moore (DR) | John Montgomery (DR) | Robert Wright (DR) | Charles; Goldsborough (F) |
| 12th (1811–1813) | Philip Stuart (F) | Joseph Kent (DR) | Philip Barton; Key (F) | Samuel Ringgold (DR) | Alexander McKim (DR) | Peter Little (DR) | John Montgomery (DR) | Robert Wright (DR) | Charles; Goldsborough (F) |
| 12th (1811–1813) | Philip Stuart (F) | Joseph Kent (DR) | Philip Barton; Key (F) | Samuel Ringgold (DR) | Alexander McKim (DR) | Peter Little (DR) | Stevenson Archer (DR) | Robert Wright (DR) | Charles; Goldsborough (F) |
| 13th (1813–1815) | Philip Stuart (F) | Joseph Kent (DR) | Alexander C. Hanson (F) | Samuel Ringgold (DR) | Alexander McKim (DR) | Nicholas R. Moore (DR) | Stevenson Archer (DR) | Robert Wright (DR) | Charles; Goldsborough (F) |
| 14th (1815–1817) | Philip Stuart (F) | John C. Herbert (F) | Alexander C. Hanson (F) | George Baer Jr. (F) | William Pinkney (DR) | Nicholas R. Moore (DR) | Stevenson Archer (DR) | Robert Wright (DR) | Charles; Goldsborough (F) |
| 14th (1815–1817) | Philip Stuart (F) | John C. Herbert (F) | George Peter (F) | George Baer Jr. (F) | Peter Little (DR) (Note: Supported the Jackson faction in the 1824 United States presidential election.) | Samuel Smith (DR) | Stevenson Archer (DR) | Robert Wright (DR) | Charles; Goldsborough (F) |
| 15th (1817–1819) | Philip Stuart (F) | John C. Herbert (F) | George Peter (F) | Samuel Ringgold (DR) | Peter Little (DR) | Samuel Smith (DR) | Philip Reed (DR) | Thomas Culbreth (DR) | Thomas Bayly (F) |
| 16th (1819–1821) | Raphael Neale (F) (Note: Supported the Adams–Clay faction in the 1824 United States presidential election.) | Joseph Kent (DR) | Henry Ridgely; Warfield (DR) | Samuel Ringgold (DR) | Peter Little (DR) | Samuel Smith (DR) | Stevenson Archer (DR) | Thomas Culbreth (DR) | Thomas Bayly (F) |
| 17th (1821–1823) | Raphael Neale (F) | Joseph Kent (DR) | Henry Ridgely; Warfield (F) | John Nelson (DR) | Peter Little (DR) | Samuel Smith (DR) | Jeremiah Cosden (DR) | Robert Wright (DR) | Thomas Bayly (F) |
| 17th (1821–1823) | Raphael Neale (F) | Joseph Kent (DR) | Henry Ridgely; Warfield (F) | John Nelson (DR) | Peter Little (DR) | Isaac McKim (DR) | Philip Reed (DR) | Robert Wright (DR) | Thomas Bayly (F) |
| 18th (1823–1825) | Raphael Neale (F) | Joseph Kent (DR) | Henry Ridgely; Warfield (F) | John Lee (F) | Peter Little (DR) | Isaac McKim (DR) | George Edward; Mitchell (DR) | William; Hayward Jr. (DR) (Note: Supported the Crawford faction in the 1824 United States presidential election.) | John S. Spence (DR) |
| 19th (1825–1827) | Clement Dorsey (NR) | Joseph Kent (NR) | George Peter (J) | Thomas Contee; Worthington (J) | Peter Little (NR) | John Barney (NR) | George Edward; Mitchell (J) | John Leeds Kerr (NR) | Robert N. Martin (NR) |
| 19th (1825–1827) | Clement Dorsey (NR) | John Crompton; Weems (J) | George Peter (J) | Thomas Contee; Worthington (J) | Peter Little (NR) | John Barney (NR) | George Edward; Mitchell (J) | John Leeds Kerr (NR) | Robert N. Martin (NR) |
| 20th (1827–1829) | Clement Dorsey (NR) | John Crompton; Weems (J) | George C. Washington (NR) | Michael Sprigg (J) | Peter Little (NR) | John Barney (NR) | Levin Gale (J) | John Leeds Kerr (NR) | Ephraim King; Wilson (NR) |
| 21st (1829–1831) | Clement Dorsey (NR) | Benedict Joseph; Semmes (NR) | George C. Washington (NR) | Michael Sprigg (J) | Elias Brown (J) | Benjamin Chew; Howard (J) | George Edward; Mitchell (J) | Richard Spencer (J) | Ephraim King; Wilson (J) |
| 22nd (1831–1833) | Daniel Jenifer (NR) | Benedict Joseph; Semmes (NR) | George C. Washington (NR) | Francis Thomas (J) | John T. H. Worthington (J) | Benjamin Chew; Howard (J) | George Edward; Mitchell (J) | John Leeds Kerr (NR) | John S. Spence (NR) |
| 22nd (1831–1833) | Daniel Jenifer (NR) | Benedict Joseph; Semmes (NR) | George C. Washington (NR) | Francis Thomas (J) | John T. H. Worthington (J) | Benjamin Chew; Howard (J) | Charles S. Sewall (J) | John Leeds Kerr (NR) | John S. Spence (NR) |

=== 1833–1843: Eight seats ===
Maryland lost one representative, down to eight. The fourth district had two representatives from 1835 to 1843.

| Congress | 1st district | 2nd district | 3rd district | 4th district | 5th district | 6th district | 7th district | 8th district |
|---|---|---|---|---|---|---|---|---|
| 23rd (1833–1835) | Littleton Purnell; Dennis (NR) | Richard Bennett; Carmichael (J) | James Turner (J) | James P. Heath (J) | Isaac McKim (J) | William Cost; Johnson (NR) | Francis Thomas (J) | John Truman; Stoddert (J) |
| Congress | 1st district | 2nd district | 3rd district | 4th district | | 5th district | 6th district | 7th district |
| Congress | 1st district | 2nd district | 3rd district | Seat A | Seat B | 5th district | 6th district | 7th district |
| 24th (1835–1837) | John N. Steele (NR) | James Pearce (NR) | James P. Heath (J) | Benjamin Chew; Howard (J) | Isaac McKim (J) | George C. Washington (NR) | Francis Thomas (J) | Daniel Jenifer (NR) |
| 25th (1837–1839) | John Dennis (W) | James Pearce (W) | John T. H. Worthington (D) | Benjamin Chew; Howard (D) | Isaac McKim (D) | William Cost; Johnson (W) | Francis Thomas (D) | Daniel Jenifer (W) |
| 25th (1837–1839) | John Dennis (W) | James Pearce (W) | John T. H. Worthington (D) | Benjamin Chew; Howard (D) | John P. Kennedy (W) | William Cost; Johnson (W) | Francis Thomas (D) | Daniel Jenifer (W) |
| 26th (1839–1841) | John Dennis (W) | Philip Francis; Thomas (D) | John T. H. Worthington (D) | Solomon Hillen Jr. (D) | James Carroll (D) | William Cost; Johnson (W) | Francis Thomas (D) | Daniel Jenifer (W) |
| 27th (1841–1843) | Isaac D. Jones (W) | James Pearce (W) | James Wray; Williams (D) | Alexander Randall (W) | John P. Kennedy (W) | William Cost; Johnson (W) | John Thomson; Mason (D) | Augustus Rhodes; Sollers (W) |
| 27th (1841–1843) | Isaac D. Jones (W) | James Pearce (W) | Charles S. Sewall (D) | Alexander Randall (W) | John P. Kennedy (W) | William Cost; Johnson (W) | John Thomson; Mason (D) | Augustus Rhodes; Sollers (W) |

=== 1843–1863: Six seats ===
Maryland lost two representatives, down to six.

| Congress | 1st district | 2nd district | 3rd district | 4th district | 5th district | 6th district |
|---|---|---|---|---|---|---|
| 28th (1843–1845) | John Causin (W) | Francis Brengle (W) | John Wethered (W) | John P. Kennedy (W) | Jacob A. Preston (W) | Thomas A. Spence (W) |
| 29th (1845–1847) | John G. Chapman (W) | Thomas J. Perry (D) | Thomas Watkins; Ligon (D) | William F. Giles (D) | Albert Constable (D) | Edward H. C. Long (W) |
| 30th (1847–1849) | John G. Chapman (W) | James Dixon Roman (W) | Thomas Watkins; Ligon (D) | Robert Milligan; McLane (D) | Alexander Evans (W) | John W. Crisfield (W) |
| 31st (1849–1851) | Richard Bowie (W) | William T. Hamilton (D) | Edward Hammond (D) | Robert Milligan; McLane (D) | Alexander Evans (W) | John Bozman Kerr (W) |
| 32nd (1851–1853) | Richard Bowie (W) | William T. Hamilton (D) | Edward Hammond (D) | Thomas Yates; Walsh (W) | Alexander Evans (W) | Joseph S. Cottman (W) |
| 33rd (1853–1855) | John Rankin; Franklin (W) | Jacob Shower (D) | Joshua Van Sant (D) | William T. Hamilton (D) | Henry May (D) | Augustus Rhodes; Sollers (W) |
| 34th (1855–1857) | James Augustus; Stewart (D) | James B. Ricaud (KN) | J. Morrison; Harris (KN) | Henry Winter; Davis (KN) | Henry William; Hoffman (KN) | Thomas Fielder; Bowie (D) |
| 35th (1857–1859) | James Augustus; Stewart (D) | James B. Ricaud (KN) | J. Morrison; Harris (KN) | Henry Winter; Davis (KN) | Jacob M. Kunkel (D) | Thomas Fielder; Bowie (D) |
| 36th (1859–1861) | James Augustus; Stewart (D) | Edwin H. Webster (KN) | J. Morrison; Harris (KN) | Henry Winter; Davis (KN) | Jacob M. Kunkel (D) | George W. Hughes (D) |
| 37th (1861–1863) | John W. Crisfield (U) | Edwin H. Webster (U) | Cornelius Leary (U) | Henry May (U) | Francis Thomas (U) | Charles Benedict; Calvert (U) |

=== 1863–1873: Five seats ===
Maryland lost one representative, down to five.

| Congress | 1st district | 2nd district | 3rd district | 4th district | 5th district |
|---|---|---|---|---|---|
| 38th (1863–1865) | John Creswell (U) | Edwin H. Webster (U) | Henry Winter Davis (U) | Francis Thomas (U) | Benjamin G. Harris (D) |
| 39th (1865–1867) | Hiram McCullough (D) | Edwin H. Webster (U) | Charles E. Phelps (U) | Francis Thomas (U) | Benjamin G. Harris (D) |
| 39th (1865–1867) | Hiram McCullough (D) | John L. Thomas Jr. (U) | Charles E. Phelps (U) | Francis Thomas (U) | Benjamin G. Harris (D) |
| 40th (1867–1869) | Hiram McCullough (D) | Stevenson Archer (D) | Charles E. Phelps (D) | Francis Thomas (R) | Frederick Stone (D) |
| 41st (1869–1871) | Samuel Hambleton (D) | Stevenson Archer (D) | Thomas Swann (D) | Patrick Hamill (D) | Frederick Stone (D) |
| 42nd (1871–1873) | Samuel Hambleton (D) | Stevenson Archer (D) | Thomas Swann (D) | John Ritchie (D) | William Matthews; Merrick (D) |

=== 1873–1953: Six seats ===
Maryland gained one representative, up to six for the next 80 years.

| Congress | 1st district | 2nd district | 3rd district | 4th district | 5th district | 6th district |
|---|---|---|---|---|---|---|
| 43rd (1873–1875) | Ephraim K. Wilson II (D) | Stevenson Archer (D) | William J. O'Brien (D) | Thomas Swann (D) | William Albert (R) | Lloyd Lowndes Jr. (R) |
| 44th (1875–1877) | Philip F. Thomas (D) | Charles B. Roberts (D) | William J. O'Brien (D) | Thomas Swann (D) | Eli Jones Henkle (D) | William Walsh (D) |
| 45th (1877–1879) | Daniel Maynadier; Henry (D) | Charles B. Roberts (D) | William Kimmel (D) | Thomas Swann (D) | Eli Jones Henkle (D) | William Walsh (D) |
| 46th (1879–1881) | Daniel Maynadier; Henry (D) | J. Frederick; C. Talbott (D) | William Kimmel (D) | Robert Milligan; McLane (D) | Eli Jones Henkle (D) | Milton Urner (R) |
| 47th (1881–1883) | George W. Covington (D) | J. Frederick; C. Talbott (D) | Fetter Schrier; Hoblitzell (D) | Robert Milligan; McLane (D) | Andrew G. Chapman (D) | Milton Urner (R) |
| 48th (1883–1885) | George W. Covington (D) | J. Frederick; C. Talbott (D) | Fetter Schrier; Hoblitzell (D) | John Van Lear; Findlay (D) | Hart B. Holton (R) | Louis E. McComas (R) |
| 49th (1885–1887) | Charles H. Gibson (D) | Frank T. Shaw (D) | William H. Cole (D) | John Van Lear; Findlay (D) | Barnes Compton (D) | Louis E. McComas (R) |
| 49th (1885–1887) | Charles H. Gibson (D) | Frank T. Shaw (D) | Harry W. Rusk (D) | John Van Lear; Findlay (D) | Barnes Compton (D) | Louis E. McComas (R) |
| 50th (1887–1889) | Charles H. Gibson (D) | Frank T. Shaw (D) | Harry W. Rusk (D) | Isidor Rayner (D) | Barnes Compton (D) | Louis E. McComas (R) |
| 51st (1889–1891) | Charles H. Gibson (D) | Herman Stump (D) | Harry W. Rusk (D) | Henry Stockbridge Jr. (R) | Barnes Compton (D) | Louis E. McComas (R) |
| 51st (1889–1891) | Charles H. Gibson (D) | Herman Stump (D) | Harry W. Rusk (D) | Henry Stockbridge Jr. (R) | Sydney E. Mudd I (R) | Louis E. McComas (R) |
| 52nd (1891–1893) | Henry Page (D) | Herman Stump (D) | Harry W. Rusk (D) | Isidor Rayner (D) | Barnes Compton (D) | William McMahon; McKaig (D) |
| 52nd (1891–1893) | John B. Brown (D) | Herman Stump (D) | Harry W. Rusk (D) | Isidor Rayner (D) | Barnes Compton (D) | William McMahon; McKaig (D) |
| 53rd (1893–1895) | Robert F. Brattan (D) | J. Frederick; C. Talbott (D) | Harry W. Rusk (D) | Isidor Rayner (D) | Barnes Compton (D) | William McMahon; McKaig (D) |
| 53rd (1893–1895) | Winder Laird Henry (D) | J. Frederick; C. Talbott (D) | Harry W. Rusk (D) | Isidor Rayner (D) | Charles E. Coffin (R) | William McMahon; McKaig (D) |
| 54th (1895–1897) | Joshua W. Miles (D) | William Benjamin; Baker (R) | Harry W. Rusk (D) | John K. Cowen (D) | Charles E. Coffin (R) | George L. Wellington (R) |
| 55th (1897–1899) | Isaac A. Barber (R) | William Benjamin; Baker (R) | William Booze (R) | W. W. McIntire (R) | Sydney E. Mudd I (R) | John McDonald (R) |
| 56th (1899–1901) | John Walter Smith (D) | William Benjamin; Baker (R) | Frank C. Wachter (R) | James William; Denny (D) | Sydney E. Mudd I (R) | George A. Pearre (R) |
| 56th (1899–1901) | Josiah Kerr (R) | William Benjamin; Baker (R) | Frank C. Wachter (R) | James William; Denny (D) | Sydney E. Mudd I (R) | George A. Pearre (R) |
| 57th (1901–1903) | William Humphreys; Jackson (R) | Albert Blakeney (R) | Frank C. Wachter (R) | Charles R. Schirm (R) | Sydney E. Mudd I (R) | George A. Pearre (R) |
| 58th (1903–1905) | William Humphreys; Jackson (R) | J. Frederick; C. Talbott (D) | Frank C. Wachter (R) | James William; Denny (D) | Sydney E. Mudd I (R) | George A. Pearre (R) |
| 59th (1905–1907) | Thomas A. Smith (D) | J. Frederick; C. Talbott (D) | Frank C. Wachter (R) | John Gill Jr. (D) | Sydney E. Mudd I (R) | George A. Pearre (R) |
| 60th (1907–1909) | William Humphreys; Jackson (R) | J. Frederick; C. Talbott (D) | Harry B. Wolf (D) | John Gill Jr. (D) | Sydney E. Mudd I (R) | George A. Pearre (R) |
| 61st (1909–1911) | J. Harry Covington (D) | J. Frederick; C. Talbott (D) | John Kronmiller (R) | John Gill Jr. (D) | Sydney E. Mudd I (R) | George A. Pearre (R) |
| 62nd (1911–1913) | J. Harry Covington (D) | J. Frederick; C. Talbott (D) | George Konig (D) | J. Charles; Linthicum (D) | Thomas Parran Sr. (R) | David John Lewis (D) |
| 63rd (1913–1915) | J. Harry Covington (D) | J. Frederick; C. Talbott (D) | Charles Pearce; Coady (D) | J. Charles; Linthicum (D) | Frank O. Smith (D) | David John Lewis (D) |
| 64th (1915–1917) | Jesse Price (D) | J. Frederick; C. Talbott (D) | Charles Pearce; Coady (D) | J. Charles; Linthicum (D) | Sydney E. Mudd II (R) | David John Lewis (D) |
| 65th (1917–1919) | Jesse Price (D) | Carville Benson (D) | Charles Pearce; Coady (D) | J. Charles; Linthicum (D) | Sydney E. Mudd II (R) | Frederick Nicholas; Zihlman (R) |
| 66th (1919–1921) | William N. Andrews (R) | Carville Benson (D) | Charles Pearce; Coady (D) | J. Charles; Linthicum (D) | Sydney E. Mudd II (R) | Frederick Nicholas; Zihlman (R) |
| 67th (1921–1923) | Thomas Alan; Goldsborough (D) | Albert Blakeney (R) | John Philip Hill (R) | J. Charles; Linthicum (D) | Sydney E. Mudd II (R) | Frederick Nicholas; Zihlman (R) |
| 68th (1923–1925) | Thomas Alan; Goldsborough (D) | Millard Tydings (D) | John Philip Hill (R) | J. Charles; Linthicum (D) | Sydney E. Mudd II (R) | Frederick Nicholas; Zihlman (R) |
| 69th (1925–1927) | Thomas Alan; Goldsborough (D) | Millard Tydings (D) | John Philip Hill (R) | J. Charles; Linthicum (D) | Stephen Warfield; Gambrill (D) | Frederick Nicholas; Zihlman (R) |
| 70th (1927–1929) | Thomas Alan; Goldsborough (D) | William Purington; Cole Jr. (D) | Vincent L. Palmisano (D) | J. Charles; Linthicum (D) | Stephen Warfield; Gambrill (D) | Frederick Nicholas; Zihlman (R) |
| 71st (1929–1931) | Thomas Alan; Goldsborough (D) | Linwood Clark (R) | Vincent L. Palmisano (D) | J. Charles; Linthicum (D) | Stephen Warfield; Gambrill (D) | Frederick Nicholas; Zihlman (R) |
| 72nd (1931–1933) | Thomas Alan; Goldsborough (D) | William Purington; Cole Jr. (D) | Vincent L. Palmisano (D) | J. Charles; Linthicum (D) | Stephen Warfield; Gambrill (D) | David John Lewis (D) |
| 73rd (1933–1935) | Thomas Alan; Goldsborough (D) | William Purington; Cole Jr. (D) | Vincent L. Palmisano (D) | Ambrose Jerome; Kennedy (D) | Stephen Warfield; Gambrill (D) | David John Lewis (D) |
| 74th (1935–1937) | Thomas Alan; Goldsborough (D) | William Purington; Cole Jr. (D) | Vincent L. Palmisano (D) | Ambrose Jerome; Kennedy (D) | Stephen Warfield; Gambrill (D) | David John Lewis (D) |
| 75th (1937–1939) | Thomas Alan; Goldsborough (D) | William Purington; Cole Jr. (D) | Vincent L. Palmisano (D) | Ambrose Jerome; Kennedy (D) | Stephen Warfield; Gambrill (D) | David John Lewis (D) |
| 76th (1939–1941) | David Jenkins Ward (D) | William Purington; Cole Jr. (D) | Thomas; D'Alesandro Jr. (D) | Ambrose Jerome; Kennedy (D) | Lansdale Ghiselin; Sasscer (D) | William D. Byron (D) |
| 77th (1941–1943) | David Jenkins Ward (D) | William Purington; Cole Jr. (D) | Thomas; D'Alesandro Jr. (D) | John Ambrose Meyer (D) | Lansdale Ghiselin; Sasscer (D) | William D. Byron (D) |
| 77th (1941–1943) | David Jenkins Ward (D) | William Purington; Cole Jr. (D) | Thomas; D'Alesandro Jr. (D) | John Ambrose Meyer (D) | Lansdale Ghiselin; Sasscer (D) | Katharine Byron (D) |
| 78th (1943–1945) | David Jenkins Ward (D) | Harry Streett; Baldwin (D) | Thomas; D'Alesandro Jr. (D) | Daniel Ellison (R) | Lansdale Ghiselin; Sasscer (D) | J. Glenn Beall (R) |
| 79th (1945–1947) | Dudley Roe (D) | Harry Streett; Baldwin (D) | Thomas; D'Alesandro Jr. (D) | George Hyde Fallon (D) | Lansdale Ghiselin; Sasscer (D) | J. Glenn Beall (R) |
| 80th (1947–1949) | Edward Tylor Miller (R) | Hugh Meade (D) | Thomas; D'Alesandro Jr. (D) | George Hyde Fallon (D) | Lansdale Ghiselin; Sasscer (D) | J. Glenn Beall (R) |
| 81st (1949–1951) | Edward Tylor Miller (R) | William P. Bolton (D) | Edward Garmatz (D) | George Hyde Fallon (D) | Lansdale Ghiselin; Sasscer (D) | J. Glenn Beall (R) |
| 82nd (1951–1953) | Edward Tylor Miller (R) | James Devereux (R) | Edward Garmatz (D) | George Hyde Fallon (D) | Lansdale Ghiselin; Sasscer (D) | J. Glenn Beall (R) |

=== 1953–1963: Seven seats ===
Maryland gained one representative, up to seven.

| Congress | 1st district | 2nd district | 3rd district | 4th district | 5th district | 6th district | 7th district |
|---|---|---|---|---|---|---|---|
| 83rd (1953–1955) | Edward Tylor; Miller (R) | James Devereux (R) | Edward; Garmatz (D) | George Hyde; Fallon (D) | Frank Small Jr. (R) | DeWitt Hyde (R) | Samuel Friedel (D) |
| 84th (1955–1957) | Edward Tylor; Miller (R) | James Devereux (R) | Edward; Garmatz (D) | George Hyde; Fallon (D) | Richard Lankford (D) | DeWitt Hyde (R) | Samuel Friedel (D) |
| 85th (1957–1959) | Edward Tylor; Miller (R) | James Devereux (R) | Edward; Garmatz (D) | George Hyde; Fallon (D) | Richard Lankford (D) | DeWitt Hyde (R) | Samuel Friedel (D) |
| 86th (1959–1961) | Thomas Francis; Johnson (D) | Daniel Brewster (D) | Edward; Garmatz (D) | George Hyde; Fallon (D) | Richard Lankford (D) | John R. Foley (D) | Samuel Friedel (D) |
| 87th (1961–1963) | Thomas Francis; Johnson (D) | Daniel Brewster (D) | Edward; Garmatz (D) | George Hyde; Fallon (D) | Richard Lankford (D) | Charles Mathias (R) | Samuel Friedel (D) |

=== 1963–present: Eight seats ===
Maryland gained one representative, up to eight. From 1963 through 1967, the eighth seat was elected at-large statewide. Starting in 1967, however, the state was redistricted and an eighth district was created.

| Congress | District | | | | | | | |
| Congress | 1st | 2nd | 3rd | 4th | 5th | 6th | 7th | At-large |
|---|---|---|---|---|---|---|---|---|
| 88th (1963–1965) | Rogers Morton (R) | Clarence Long (D) | Edward; Garmatz (D) | George Hyde; Fallon (D) | Richard Lankford (D) | Charles Mathias (R) | Samuel Friedel (D) | Carlton R. Sickles (D) |
| 89th (1965–1967) | Rogers Morton (R) | Clarence Long (D) | Edward; Garmatz (D) | George Hyde; Fallon (D) | Hervey Machen (D) | Charles Mathias (R) | Samuel Friedel (D) | Carlton R. Sickles (D) |
| 90th (1967–1969) | Rogers Morton (R) | Clarence Long (D) | Edward; Garmatz (D) | George Hyde; Fallon (D) | Hervey Machen (D) | Charles Mathias (R) | Samuel Friedel (D) | 8th |
| 90th (1967–1969) | Rogers Morton (R) | Clarence Long (D) | Edward; Garmatz (D) | George Hyde; Fallon (D) | Hervey Machen (D) | Charles Mathias (R) | Samuel Friedel (D) | Gilbert Gude (R) |
| 91st (1969–1971) | Rogers Morton (R) | Clarence Long (D) | Edward; Garmatz (D) | George Hyde; Fallon (D) | Lawrence Hogan (R) | J. Glenn Beall Jr. (R) | Samuel Friedel (D) | Gilbert Gude (R) |
| 92nd (1971–1973) | Rogers Morton (R) | Clarence Long (D) | Edward; Garmatz (D) | Paul Sarbanes (D) | Lawrence Hogan (R) | Goodloe Byron (D) | Parren Mitchell (D) | Gilbert Gude (R) |
| 92nd (1971–1973) | William O. Mills (R) | Clarence Long (D) | Edward; Garmatz (D) | Paul Sarbanes (D) | Lawrence Hogan (R) | Goodloe Byron (D) | Parren Mitchell (D) | Gilbert Gude (R) |
| 93rd (1973–1975) | William O. Mills (R) | Clarence Long (D) | Paul Sarbanes (D) | Marjorie Holt (R) | Lawrence Hogan (R) | Goodloe Byron (D) | Parren Mitchell (D) | Gilbert Gude (R) |
| 93rd (1973–1975) | Robert Bauman (R) | Clarence Long (D) | Paul Sarbanes (D) | Marjorie Holt (R) | Lawrence Hogan (R) | Goodloe Byron (D) | Parren Mitchell (D) | Gilbert Gude (R) |
| 94th (1975–1977) | Robert Bauman (R) | Clarence Long (D) | Paul Sarbanes (D) | Marjorie Holt (R) | Gladys Spellman (D) | Goodloe Byron (D) | Parren Mitchell (D) | Gilbert Gude (R) |
| 95th (1977–1979) | Robert Bauman (R) | Clarence Long (D) | Barbara; Mikulski (D) | Marjorie Holt (R) | Gladys Spellman (D) | Goodloe Byron (D) | Parren Mitchell (D) | Newton Steers (R) |
| 96th (1979–1981) | Robert Bauman (R) | Clarence Long (D) | Barbara; Mikulski (D) | Marjorie Holt (R) | Gladys Spellman (D) | Beverly Byron (D) | Parren Mitchell (D) | Michael D. Barnes (D) |
| 97th (1981–1983) | Roy Dyson (D) | Clarence Long (D) | Barbara; Mikulski (D) | Marjorie Holt (R) | Gladys Spellman (D) | Beverly Byron (D) | Parren Mitchell (D) | Michael D. Barnes (D) |
| 97th (1981–1983) | Roy Dyson (D) | Clarence Long (D) | Barbara; Mikulski (D) | Marjorie Holt (R) | Steny Hoyer (D) | Beverly Byron (D) | Parren Mitchell (D) | Michael D. Barnes (D) |
| 98th (1983–1985) | Roy Dyson (D) | Clarence Long (D) | Barbara; Mikulski (D) | Marjorie Holt (R) | Steny Hoyer (D) | Beverly Byron (D) | Parren Mitchell (D) | Michael D. Barnes (D) |
| 99th (1985–1987) | Roy Dyson (D) | Helen Delich; Bentley (R) | Barbara; Mikulski (D) | Marjorie Holt (R) | Steny Hoyer (D) | Beverly Byron (D) | Parren Mitchell (D) | Michael D. Barnes (D) |
| 100th (1987–1989) | Roy Dyson (D) | Helen Delich; Bentley (R) | Ben Cardin (D) | Tom McMillen (D) | Steny Hoyer (D) | Beverly Byron (D) | Kweisi Mfume (D) | Connie Morella (R) |
| 101st (1989–1991) | Roy Dyson (D) | Helen Delich; Bentley (R) | Ben Cardin (D) | Tom McMillen (D) | Steny Hoyer (D) | Beverly Byron (D) | Kweisi Mfume (D) | Connie Morella (R) |
| 102nd (1991–1993) | Wayne Gilchrest (R) | Helen Delich; Bentley (R) | Ben Cardin (D) | Tom McMillen (D) | Steny Hoyer (D) | Beverly Byron (D) | Kweisi Mfume (D) | Connie Morella (R) |
| 103rd (1993–1995) | Wayne Gilchrest (R) | Helen Delich; Bentley (R) | Ben Cardin (D) | Albert Wynn (D) | Steny Hoyer (D) | Roscoe Bartlett (R) | Kweisi Mfume (D) | Connie Morella (R) |
| 104th (1995–1997) | Wayne Gilchrest (R) | Bob Ehrlich (R) | Ben Cardin (D) | Albert Wynn (D) | Steny Hoyer (D) | Roscoe Bartlett (R) | Kweisi Mfume (D) | Connie Morella (R) |
| 104th (1995–1997) | Wayne Gilchrest (R) | Bob Ehrlich (R) | Ben Cardin (D) | Albert Wynn (D) | Steny Hoyer (D) | Roscoe Bartlett (R) | Elijah Cummings (D) | Connie Morella (R) |
| 105th (1997–1999) | Wayne Gilchrest (R) | Bob Ehrlich (R) | Ben Cardin (D) | Albert Wynn (D) | Steny Hoyer (D) | Roscoe Bartlett (R) | Elijah Cummings (D) | Connie Morella (R) |
| 106th (1999–2001) | Wayne Gilchrest (R) | Bob Ehrlich (R) | Ben Cardin (D) | Albert Wynn (D) | Steny Hoyer (D) | Roscoe Bartlett (R) | Elijah Cummings (D) | Connie Morella (R) |
| 107th (2001–2003) | Wayne Gilchrest (R) | Bob Ehrlich (R) | Ben Cardin (D) | Albert Wynn (D) | Steny Hoyer (D) | Roscoe Bartlett (R) | Elijah Cummings (D) | Connie Morella (R) |
| 108th (2003–2005) | Wayne Gilchrest (R) | Dutch; Ruppersberger (D) | Ben Cardin (D) | Albert Wynn (D) | Steny Hoyer (D) | Roscoe Bartlett (R) | Elijah Cummings (D) | Chris; Van Hollen (D) |
| 109th (2005–2007) | Wayne Gilchrest (R) | Dutch; Ruppersberger (D) | Ben Cardin (D) | Albert Wynn (D) | Steny Hoyer (D) | Roscoe Bartlett (R) | Elijah Cummings (D) | Chris; Van Hollen (D) |
| 110th (2007–2009) | Wayne Gilchrest (R) | Dutch; Ruppersberger (D) | John Sarbanes (D) | Albert Wynn (D) | Steny Hoyer (D) | Roscoe Bartlett (R) | Elijah Cummings (D) | Chris; Van Hollen (D) |
| 110th (2007–2009) | Wayne Gilchrest (R) | Dutch; Ruppersberger (D) | John Sarbanes (D) | Donna Edwards (D) | Steny Hoyer (D) | Roscoe Bartlett (R) | Elijah Cummings (D) | Chris; Van Hollen (D) |
| 111th (2009–2011) | Frank Kratovil (D) | Dutch; Ruppersberger (D) | John Sarbanes (D) | Donna Edwards (D) | Steny Hoyer (D) | Roscoe Bartlett (R) | Elijah Cummings (D) | Chris; Van Hollen (D) |
| 112th (2011–2013) | Andy Harris (R) | Dutch; Ruppersberger (D) | John Sarbanes (D) | Donna Edwards (D) | Steny Hoyer (D) | Roscoe Bartlett (R) | Elijah Cummings (D) | Chris; Van Hollen (D) |
| 113th (2013–2015) | Andy Harris (R) | Dutch; Ruppersberger (D) | John Sarbanes (D) | Donna Edwards (D) | Steny Hoyer (D) | John Delaney (D) | Elijah Cummings (D) | Chris; Van Hollen (D) |
| 114th (2015–2017) | Andy Harris (R) | Dutch; Ruppersberger (D) | John Sarbanes (D) | Donna Edwards (D) | Steny Hoyer (D) | John Delaney (D) | Elijah Cummings (D) | Chris; Van Hollen (D) |
| 115th (2017–2019) | Andy Harris (R) | Dutch; Ruppersberger (D) | John Sarbanes (D) | Anthony Brown (D) | Steny Hoyer (D) | John Delaney (D) | Elijah Cummings (D) | Jamie Raskin (D) |
| 116th (2019–2021) | Andy Harris (R) | Dutch; Ruppersberger (D) | John Sarbanes (D) | Anthony Brown (D) | Steny Hoyer (D) | David Trone (D) | Elijah Cummings (D) | Jamie Raskin (D) |
| 116th (2019–2021) | Andy Harris (R) | Dutch; Ruppersberger (D) | John Sarbanes (D) | Anthony Brown (D) | Steny Hoyer (D) | David Trone (D) | Kweisi Mfume (D) | Jamie Raskin (D) |
| 117th (2021–2023) | Andy Harris (R) | Dutch; Ruppersberger (D) | John Sarbanes (D) | Anthony Brown (D) | Steny Hoyer (D) | David Trone (D) | Kweisi Mfume (D) | Jamie Raskin (D) |
| 118th (2023–2025) | Andy Harris (R) | Dutch; Ruppersberger (D) | John Sarbanes (D) | Glenn Ivey (D) | Steny Hoyer (D) | David Trone (D) | Kweisi Mfume (D) | Jamie Raskin (D) |
| 119th (2025–2027) | Andy Harris (R) | Johnny Olszewski (D) | Sarah Elfreth (D) | Glenn Ivey (D) | Steny Hoyer (D) | April McClain Delaney (D) | Kweisi Mfume (D) | Jamie Raskin (D) |
| 120th (2025–2027) | Andy Harris (R) | Johnny Olszewski (D) | Sarah Elfreth (D) | Glenn Ivey (D) | Adrian Boafo (D) | April McClain Delaney (D) | Kweisi Mfume (D) | Jamie Raskin (D) |
| Congress | 1st | 2nd | 3rd | 4th | 5th | 6th | 7th | 8th |
| Congress | District | | | | | | | |

== United States Senate ==
Current U.S. senators from Maryland
| Maryland CPVI (2025): D+15 | Class I senator | Class III senator |
|---|---|---|
| Maryland CPVI (2025): D+15 | Angela Alsobrooks (Junior senator) (Upper Marlboro) | Chris Van Hollen (Senior senator) (Kensington) |
| Party | Democratic | Democratic |
| Incumbent since | January 3, 2025 | January 3, 2017 |

The alternating grey and white boxes indicate the duration of six-year Senate terms.

| Class I senators | Congress | Class III senators |
|---|---|---|
| Charles Carroll (PA) | 1st (1789–1791) | John Henry (PA) |
| Charles Carroll (PA) | 2nd (1791–1793) | John Henry (PA) |
| Richard Potts (PA) | 2nd (1791–1793) | John Henry (PA) |
| Richard Potts (PA) | 3rd (1793–1795) | John Henry (PA) |
| Richard Potts (F) | 4th (1795–1797) | John Henry (F) |
| John Eager Howard (F) | 4th (1795–1797) | John Henry (F) |
| John Eager Howard (F) | 5th (1797–1799) | John Henry (F) |
| John Eager Howard (F) | 5th (1797–1799) | James Lloyd (F) |
| John Eager Howard (F) | 6th (1799–1801) | James Lloyd (F) |
| John Eager Howard (F) | 6th (1799–1801) | William Hindman (F) |
| John Eager Howard (F) | 7th (1801–1803) | William Hindman (F) |
| John Eager Howard (F) | 7th (1801–1803) | Robert Wright (DR) |
| Samuel Smith (DR) | 8th (1803–1805) | Robert Wright (DR) |
| Samuel Smith (DR) | 9th (1805–1807) | Robert Wright (DR) |
| Samuel Smith (DR) | 9th (1805–1807) | Philip Reed (DR) |
| Samuel Smith (DR) | 10th (1807–1809) | Philip Reed (DR) |
| Samuel Smith (DR) | 11th (1809–1811) | Philip Reed (DR) |
| Samuel Smith (DR) | 12th (1811–1813) | Philip Reed (DR) |
| Samuel Smith (DR) | 13th (1813–1815) | Robert Henry; Goldsborough (F) |
| Robert Goodloe Harper (F) | 14th (1815–1817) | Robert Henry; Goldsborough (F) |
| Alexander C. Hanson (F) | 14th (1815–1817) | Robert Henry; Goldsborough (F) |
| Alexander C. Hanson (F) | 15th (1817–1819) | Robert Henry; Goldsborough (F) |
| Alexander C. Hanson (F) | 16th (1819–1821) | Edward Lloyd (DR) |
| William Pinkney (DR) | 16th (1819–1821) | Edward Lloyd (DR) |
| William Pinkney (DR) | 17th (1821–1823) | Edward Lloyd (DR) |
| Samuel Smith (DR) | 17th (1821–1823) | Edward Lloyd (DR) |
| Samuel Smith (DR) | 18th (1823–1825) | Edward Lloyd (DR) |
| Samuel Smith (J) | 19th (1825–1827) | Edward Lloyd (J) |
| Samuel Smith (J) | 19th (1825–1827) | Ezekiel F. Chambers (NR) |
| Samuel Smith (J) | 20th (1827–1829) | Ezekiel F. Chambers (NR) |
| Samuel Smith (J) | 21st (1829–1831) | Ezekiel F. Chambers (NR) |
| Samuel Smith (J) | 22nd (1831–1833) | Ezekiel F. Chambers (NR) |
| Joseph Kent (NR) | 23rd (1833–1835) | Ezekiel F. Chambers (NR) |
| Joseph Kent (NR) | 23rd (1833–1835) | Robert Henry; Goldsborough (NR) |
| Joseph Kent (NR) | 24th (1835–1837) | Robert Henry; Goldsborough (NR) |
| Joseph Kent (NR) | 24th (1835–1837) | John S. Spence (NR) |
| Joseph Kent (W) | 25th (1837–1839) | John S. Spence (W) |
| William Duhurst Merrick (W) | 25th (1837–1839) | John S. Spence (W) |
| William Duhurst Merrick (W) | 26th (1839–1841) | John S. Spence (W) |
| William Duhurst Merrick (W) | 26th (1839–1841) | John Leeds Kerr (W) |
| William Duhurst Merrick (W) | 27th (1841–1843) | John Leeds Kerr (W) |
| William Duhurst Merrick (W) | 28th (1843–1845) | James Pearce (W) |
| Reverdy Johnson (W) | 29th (1845–1847) | James Pearce (W) |
| Reverdy Johnson (W) | 30th (1847–1849) | James Pearce (W) |
| Reverdy Johnson (W) | 31st (1849–1851) | James Pearce (W) |
| David Stewart (W) | 31st (1849–1851) | James Pearce (W) |
| Thomas Pratt (W) | 31st (1849–1851) | James Pearce (W) |
| Thomas Pratt (W) | 32nd (1851–1853) | James Pearce (W) |
| Thomas Pratt (W) | 33rd (1853–1855) | James Pearce (W) |
| Thomas Pratt (W) | 34th (1855–1857) | James Pearce (W) |
| Anthony Kennedy (KN) | 35th (1857–1859) | James Pearce (D) |
| Anthony Kennedy (KN) | 36th (1859–1861) | James Pearce (D) |
| Anthony Kennedy (U) | 37th (1861–1863) | James Pearce (D) |
| Anthony Kennedy (U) | 37th (1861–1863) | Thomas Holliday Hicks (U) |
| Reverdy Johnson (U) | 38th (1863–1865) | Thomas Holliday Hicks (UU) |
| Reverdy Johnson (D) | 39th (1865–1867) | John Creswell (UU) |
| Reverdy Johnson (D) | 40th (1867–1869) | George Vickers (D) |
| William Pinkney Whyte (D) | 40th (1867–1869) | George Vickers (D) |
| William T. Hamilton (D) | 41st (1869–1871) | George Vickers (D) |
| William T. Hamilton (D) | 42nd (1871–1873) | George Vickers (D) |
| William T. Hamilton (D) | 43rd (1873–1875) | George R. Dennis (D) |
| William Pinkney Whyte (D) | 44th (1875–1877) | George R. Dennis (D) |
| William Pinkney Whyte (D) | 45th (1877–1879) | George R. Dennis (D) |
| William Pinkney Whyte (D) | 46th (1879–1881) | James Black Groome (D) |
| Arthur P. Gorman (D) | 47th (1881–1883) | James Black Groome (D) |
| Arthur P. Gorman (D) | 48th (1883–1885) | James Black Groome (D) |
| Arthur P. Gorman (D) | 49th (1885–1887) | Ephraim K. Wilson II (D) |
| Arthur P. Gorman (D) | 50th (1887–1889) | Ephraim K. Wilson II (D) |
| Arthur P. Gorman (D) | 51st (1889–1891) | Ephraim K. Wilson II (D) |
| Arthur P. Gorman (D) | 52nd (1891–1893) | Charles H. Gibson (D) |
| Arthur P. Gorman (D) | 53rd (1893–1895) | Charles H. Gibson (D) |
| Arthur P. Gorman (D) | 54th (1895–1897) | Charles H. Gibson (D) |
| Arthur P. Gorman (D) | 55th (1897–1899) | George L. Wellington (R) |
| Louis E. McComas (R) | 56th (1899–1901) | George L. Wellington (R) |
| Louis E. McComas (R) | 57th (1901–1903) | George L. Wellington (R) |
| Louis E. McComas (R) | 58th (1903–1905) | Arthur P. Gorman (D) |
| Isidor Rayner (D) | 59th (1905–1907) | Arthur P. Gorman (D) |
| Isidor Rayner (D) | 59th (1905–1907) | William Pinkney Whyte (D) |
| Isidor Rayner (D) | 60th (1907–1909) | William Pinkney Whyte (D) |
| Isidor Rayner (D) | 60th (1907–1909) | John Walter Smith (D) |
| Isidor Rayner (D) | 61st (1909–1911) | John Walter Smith (D) |
| Isidor Rayner (D) | 62nd (1911–1913) | John Walter Smith (D) |
| William P. Jackson (R) | 62nd (1911–1913) | John Walter Smith (D) |
| William P. Jackson (R) | 63rd (1913–1915) | John Walter Smith (D) |
| Blair Lee I (D) | 63rd (1913–1915) | John Walter Smith (D) |
| Blair Lee I (D) | 64th (1915–1917) | John Walter Smith (D) |
| Joseph I. France (R) | 65th (1917–1919) | John Walter Smith (D) |
| Joseph I. France (R) | 66th (1919–1921) | John Walter Smith (D) |
| Joseph I. France (R) | 67th (1921–1923) | Ovington Weller (R) |
| William Cabell Bruce (D) | 68th (1923–1925) | Ovington Weller (R) |
| William Cabell Bruce (D) | 69th (1925–1927) | Ovington Weller (R) |
| William Cabell Bruce (D) | 70th (1927–1929) | Millard Tydings (D) |
| Phillips Lee; Goldsborough (R) | 71st (1929–1931) | Millard Tydings (D) |
| Phillips Lee; Goldsborough (R) | 72nd (1931–1933) | Millard Tydings (D) |
| Phillips Lee; Goldsborough (R) | 73rd (1933–1935) | Millard Tydings (D) |
| George L. P. Radcliffe (D) | 74th (1935–1937) | Millard Tydings (D) |
| George L. P. Radcliffe (D) | 75th (1937–1939) | Millard Tydings (D) |
| George L. P. Radcliffe (D) | 76th (1939–1941) | Millard Tydings (D) |
| George L. P. Radcliffe (D) | 77th (1941–1943) | Millard Tydings (D) |
| George L. P. Radcliffe (D) | 78th (1943–1945) | Millard Tydings (D) |
| George L. P. Radcliffe (D) | 79th (1945–1947) | Millard Tydings (D) |
| Herbert O'Conor (D) | 80th (1947–1949) | Millard Tydings (D) |
| Herbert O'Conor (D) | 81st (1949–1951) | Millard Tydings (D) |
| Herbert O'Conor (D) | 82nd (1951–1953) | John Marshall Butler (R) |
| J. Glenn Beall (R) | 83rd (1953–1955) | John Marshall Butler (R) |
| J. Glenn Beall (R) | 84th (1955–1957) | John Marshall Butler (R) |
| J. Glenn Beall (R) | 85th (1957–1959) | John Marshall Butler (R) |
| J. Glenn Beall (R) | 86th (1959–1961) | John Marshall Butler (R) |
| J. Glenn Beall (R) | 87th (1961–1963) | John Marshall Butler (R) |
| J. Glenn Beall (R) | 88th (1963–1965) | Daniel Brewster (D) |
| Joseph Tydings (D) | 89th (1965–1967) | Daniel Brewster (D) |
| Joseph Tydings (D) | 90th (1967–1969) | Daniel Brewster (D) |
| Joseph Tydings (D) | 91st (1969–1971) | Charles Mathias (R) |
| J. Glenn Beall Jr. (R) | 92nd (1971–1973) | Charles Mathias (R) |
| J. Glenn Beall Jr. (R) | 93rd (1973–1975) | Charles Mathias (R) |
| J. Glenn Beall Jr. (R) | 94th (1975–1977) | Charles Mathias (R) |
| Paul Sarbanes (D) | 95th (1977–1979) | Charles Mathias (R) |
| Paul Sarbanes (D) | 96th (1979–1981) | Charles Mathias (R) |
| Paul Sarbanes (D) | 97th (1981–1983) | Charles Mathias (R) |
| Paul Sarbanes (D) | 98th (1983–1985) | Charles Mathias (R) |
| Paul Sarbanes (D) | 99th (1985–1987) | Charles Mathias (R) |
| Paul Sarbanes (D) | 100th (1987–1989) | Barbara Mikulski (D) |
| Paul Sarbanes (D) | 101st (1989–1991) | Barbara Mikulski (D) |
| Paul Sarbanes (D) | 102nd (1991–1993) | Barbara Mikulski (D) |
| Paul Sarbanes (D) | 103rd (1993–1995) | Barbara Mikulski (D) |
| Paul Sarbanes (D) | 104th (1995–1997) | Barbara Mikulski (D) |
| Paul Sarbanes (D) | 105th (1997–1999) | Barbara Mikulski (D) |
| Paul Sarbanes (D) | 106th (1999–2001) | Barbara Mikulski (D) |
| Paul Sarbanes (D) | 107th (2001–2003) | Barbara Mikulski (D) |
| Paul Sarbanes (D) | 108th (2003–2005) | Barbara Mikulski (D) |
| Paul Sarbanes (D) | 109th (2005–2007) | Barbara Mikulski (D) |
| Ben Cardin (D) | 110th (2007–2009) | Barbara Mikulski (D) |
| Ben Cardin (D) | 111th (2009–2011) | Barbara Mikulski (D) |
| Ben Cardin (D) | 112th (2011–2013) | Barbara Mikulski (D) |
| Ben Cardin (D) | 113th (2013–2015) | Barbara Mikulski (D) |
| Ben Cardin (D) | 114th (2015–2017) | Barbara Mikulski (D) |
| Ben Cardin (D) | 115th (2017–2019) | Chris Van Hollen (D) |
| Ben Cardin (D) | 116th (2019–2021) | Chris Van Hollen (D) |
| Ben Cardin (D) | 117th (2021–2023) | Chris Van Hollen (D) |
| Ben Cardin (D) | 118th (2023–2025) | Chris Van Hollen (D) |
| Angela Alsobrooks (D) | 119th (2025–2027) | Chris Van Hollen (D) |

== Key ==
Anti-Administration (AA)
Conservative (Con)
Democratic (D)
Democratic-Republican (DR)
Federalist (F)
Pro-Administration (PA)
Jacksonian (J)
Know Nothing (KN)
National Republican (NR)
Republican (R)
Union (U)
Unconditional Union (UU)
Whig (W)

== See also ==
- List of United States congressional districts
- Maryland's congressional districts
- Political party strength in Maryland
