= List of United States representatives from Maryland =

The following is an alphabetical list of United States representatives from the state of Maryland. For chronological tables of members of both houses of the United States Congress from the state (through the present day), see Maryland's congressional delegations. The list of names should be complete, but other data may be incomplete.

== Current representatives ==
As of January 3, 2025

- 1st district: Andy Harris (R) (since 2011)
- 2nd district: Johnny Olszewski (D) (since 2025)
- 3rd district: Sarah Elfreth (D) (since 2025)
- 4th district: Glenn Ivey (D) (since 2023)
- 5th district: Steny Hoyer (D) (since 1981)
- 6th district: April McClain Delaney (D) (since 2025)
- 7th district: Kweisi Mfume (D) (since 2020)
- 8th district: Jamie Raskin (D) (since 2017)

== List of members ==
Member	Years	Party	District	Electoral history
William Albert	March 4, 1873 – March 3, 1875	Republican	5th	[data missing]
William N. Andrews	March 4, 1919 – March 3, 1921	Republican	1st	[data missing]
John Archer	March 4, 1811 – March 3, 1817	Democratic-Republican	6th	[data missing]
Stevenson Archer	October 26, 1811 – March 3, 1817	Democratic-Republican	6th	[data missing]
Stevenson Archer	March 4, 1819 – March 3, 1821	Democratic-Republican	7th	[data missing]
Stevenson Archer	March 4, 1867 – March 3, 1875	Democratic	2nd	[data missing]
George Baer Jr.	March 4, 1797 – March 3, 1801	Federalist	4th	[data missing]
George Baer Jr.	March 4, 1815 – March 3, 1817	Federalist	4th	[data missing]
William B. Baker	March 4, 1895 – March 3, 1901	Republican	1st	[data missing]
Harry S. Baldwin	January 3, 1943 – January 3, 1947	Democratic	2nd	[data missing]
Isaac A. Barber	March 4, 1897 – March 3, 1899	Republican	1st	[data missing]
Michael D. Barnes	January 3, 1979 – January 3, 1987	Democratic	8th	[data missing]
John Barney	March 4, 1825 – March 3, 1829	Anti-Jacksonian	5th	[data missing]
Roscoe Bartlett	January 3, 1993 – January 3, 2013	Republican	6th	[data missing]
Robert Bauman	August 21, 1973 – January 3, 1981	Republican	1st	[data missing]
Thomas Bayly	March 4, 1817 – March 3, 1823	Federalist	8th	[data missing]
James G. Beall	January 3, 1943 – January 3, 1953	Republican	6th	[data missing]
John G. Beall Jr.	January 3, 1969 – January 3, 1971	Republican	6th	[data missing]
Carville Benson	November 5, 1918 – March 3, 1921	Democratic	2nd	[data missing]
Helen D. Bentley	January 3, 1985 – January 3, 1995	Republican	2nd	[data missing]
Albert Blakeney	March 4, 1901 – March 3, 1903	Republican	2nd	[data missing]
Albert Blakeney	March 4, 1921 – March 3, 1923	Republican	2nd	[data missing]
William P. Bolton	January 3, 1949 – January 3, 1951	Democratic	2nd	[data missing]
William Samuel Booze	March 4, 1897 – March 3, 1899	Republican	3rd	[data missing]
Richard Bowie	March 4, 1849 – March 3, 1853	Whig	1st	[data missing]
Thomas F. Bowie	March 4, 1855 – March 3, 1859	Democratic	6th	[data missing]
Walter Bowie	March 24, 1802 – March 3, 1805	Democratic-Republican	2nd	[data missing]
Robert F. Brattan	March 4, 1893 – May 10, 1894	Democratic	1st	[data missing]
Francis Brengle	March 4, 1843 – March 3, 1845	Whig	2nd	[data missing]
Daniel Brewster	January 3, 1959 – January 3, 1963	Democratic	2nd	[data missing]
Anthony Brown	January 3, 2017 – January 3, 2023	Democratic	4th	First elected in 2016. Retired to run for attorney general of Maryland.
Elias Brown	March 4, 1829 – March 3, 1831	Jacksonian	5th	[data missing]
John Brown	March 4, 1809 – ????, 1810	Democratic-Republican	7th	Resigned after appointment as Clerk of Court of Queen Anne's County.
John B. Brown	November 8, 1892 – March 4, 1893	Democratic	1st	[data missing]
Beverly Byron	January 3, 1979 – January 3, 1993	Democratic	6th	[data missing]
Goodloe Byron	January 3, 1971 – October 11, 1978	Democratic	6th	Died.
Katharine Byron	May 27, 1941 – January 3, 1943	Democratic	6th	[data missing]
William D. Byron	January 3, 1939 – February 27, 1941	Democratic	6th	Died.
Charles B. Calvert	March 4, 1861 – March 3, 1863	Union	6th	[data missing]
John Campbell	March 4, 1801 – March 3, 1811	Federalist	1st	[data missing]
Ben Cardin	January 3, 1987 – January 3, 2007	Democratic	3rd	[data missing]
Richard B. Carmichael	March 4, 1833 – March 3, 1835	Jacksonian	2nd	[data missing]
Daniel Carroll	March 4, 1789 – March 3, 1791	Pro-Administration	6th	[data missing]
James Carroll	March 4, 1839 – March 3, 1841	Democratic	4th	[data missing]
John Causin	March 4, 1843 – March 3, 1845	Whig	1st	[data missing]
Andrew G. Chapman	March 4, 1881 – March 3, 1883	Democratic	5th	[data missing]
John G. Chapman	March 4, 1845 – March 3, 1849	Whig	1st	[data missing]
Gabriel Christie	March 4, 1793 – March 3, 1795	Anti-Administration	6th	[data missing]
Gabriel Christie	March 4, 1795 – March 3, 1797	Democratic-Republican	6th	[data missing]
Gabriel Christie	March 4, 1799 – March 3, 1801	Democratic-Republican	6th	[data missing]
Linwood Clark	March 4, 1929 – March 3, 1931	Republican	2nd	[data missing]
Charles P. Coady	November 4, 1913 – March 3, 1921	Democratic	3rd	[data missing]
Charles E. Coffin	November 6, 1894 – March 3, 1897	Republican	5th	[data missing]
William H. Cole	March 4, 1885 – July 8, 1886	Democratic	3rd	Died.
William P. Cole Jr.	March 4, 1927 – March 3, 1929	Democratic	2nd	[data missing]
William P. Cole Jr.	March 4, 1931 – October 26, 1942	Democratic	2nd	Resigned to become judge of US Customs Court
Barnes Compton	March 4, 1885 – March 20, 1890	Democratic	5th	Lost contested election
Barnes Compton	March 4, 1891 – May 15, 1894	Democratic	5th	Resigned.
Albert Constable	March 4, 1845 – March 3, 1847	Democratic	5th	[data missing]
Benjamin Contee	March 4, 1789 – March 3, 1791	Anti-Administration	3rd	[data missing]
Jeremiah Cosden	March 4, 1821 – March 19, 1822	Democratic-Republican	6th	Lost contested election
Joseph S. Cottman	March 4, 1851 – March 3, 1853	Independent Whig	6th	[data missing]
George W. Covington	March 4, 1881 – March 3, 1885	Democratic	1st	[data missing]
J. Harry Covington	March 4, 1909 – September 30, 1914	Democratic	1st	Resigned.
Leonard Covington	March 4, 1805 – March 3, 1807	Democratic-Republican	2nd	[data missing]
John K. Cowen	March 4, 1895 – March 3, 1897	Democratic	4th	[data missing]
Jeremiah Crabb	March 4, 1795 – June 1, 1796	Federalist	3rd	Resigned.
William Craik	December 5, 1796 – March 3, 1801	Federalist	3rd	Resigned.
John Creswell	March 4, 1863 – March 3, 1865	Republican	1st	[data missing]
John W. Crisfield	March 4, 1861 – March 3, 1849	Whig	6th	[data missing]
John W. Crisfield	March 4, 1861 – March 3, 1863	Union	1st	[data missing]
Thomas Culbreth	March 4, 1817 – March 3, 1821	Democratic-Republican	6th	[data missing]
Elijah Cummings	April 16, 1996 – October 17, 2019	Democratic	7th	First elected in 1996 to finish Kweisi Mfume's term. Died.
Thomas D'Alesandro Jr.	January 3, 1939 – May 16, 1947	Democratic	3rd	Resigned to become Mayor of Baltimore.
Henry W. Davis	March 4, 1855 – March 3, 1861	Know Nothing	4th	[data missing]
Henry W. Davis	March 4, 1863 – March 3, 1865	Unconditional Union	1st	[data missing]
John Delaney	January 3, 2013 – January 3, 2019	Democratic	6th	[data missing]
John Dennis	March 4, 1797 – March 3, 1805	Federalist	8th	[data missing]
John Dennis	March 4, 1837 – March 3, 1841	Whig	1st	[data missing]
Littleton Dennis	March 4, 1833 – April 14, 1834	Anti-Jacksonian	1st	Died.
James W. Denny	March 4, 1899 – March 3, 1901	Democratic	4th	[data missing]
James W. Denny	March 4, 1903 – March 3, 1905	Democratic	4th	[data missing]
George Dent	March 4, 1793 – March 3, 1795	Pro-Administration	1st	First elected in 1792. Retired.
George Dent	March 4, 1795 – March 3, 1801	Federalist	1st	First elected in 1792. Retired.
James Devereux	January 3, 1951 – January 3, 1959	Republican	2nd	[data missing]
Clement Dorsey	March 4, 1825 – March 3, 1829	Anti-Jacksonian	1st	[data missing]
Clement Dorsey	March 4, 1829 – March 3, 1831	Anti-Jacksonian	1st	[data missing]
Gabriel Duvall	November 11, 1794 – March 3, 1795	Anti-Administration	2nd	[data missing] Resigned to become Chief Justice of General Court of Maryland.
Gabriel Duvall	March 4, 1795 – March 28, 1796	Democratic-Republican	2nd	[data missing] Resigned to become Chief Justice of General Court of Maryland.
Roy Dyson	January 3, 1981 – January 3, 1991	Democratic	1st	[data missing]
Benjamin Edwards	January 2, 1795 – March 3, 1795	Pro-Administration	3rd	[data missing]
Donna Edwards	June 17, 2008 – January 3, 2017	Democratic	4th	[data missing]
Bob Ehrlich	January 3, 1995 – January 3, 2003	Republican	2nd	[data missing]
Sarah Elfreth	January 3, 2025 – present	Democratic	3rd	First elected in 2024. Incumbent.
Daniel Ellison	January 3, 1943 – January 3, 1945	Republican	4th	[data missing]
Alexander Evans	March 4, 1847 – March 3, 1853	Whig	5th	[data missing]
George H. Fallon	January 3, 1945 – January 3, 1971	Democratic	4th	[data missing]
John Van Lear Findlay	March 4, 1883 – March 3, 1887	Democratic	4th	[data missing]
John R. Foley	January 3, 1959 – January 3, 1961	Democratic	6th	[data missing]
Uriah Forrest	March 4, 1793 – November 8, 1794	Pro-Administration	3rd	[data missing]
John R. Franklin	March 4, 1853 – March 3, 1855	Democratic	1st	[data missing]
Samuel Friedel	January 3, 1953 – January 3, 1971	Democratic	7th	[data missing]
George Gale	March 4, 1789 – March 3, 1791	Pro-Administration	5th	[data missing]
Levin Gale	March 4, 1827 – March 3, 1829	Jacksonian	6th	[data missing]
Edward Garmatz	July 15, 1947 – January 3, 1973	Democratic	3rd	[data missing]
Charles H. Gibson	March 4, 1885 – March 3, 1891	Democratic	1st	[data missing]
Wayne Gilchrest	January 3, 1991 – January 3, 2009	Republican	1st	[data missing]
John Gill Jr.	March 4, 1905 – March 3, 1911	Democratic	4th	[data missing]
John K. Cowen	March 4, 1895 – March 3, 1897	Democratic	4th	[data missing]
Stephen W. Gambrill	November 4, 1924 – December 19, 1938	Democratic	5th	Died.
Charles Goldsborough	March 4, 1805 – March 3, 1817	Federalist	8th	[data missing]
Thomas A. Goldsborough	March 4, 1921 – April 5, 1939	Democratic	1st	Resigned having been appointed an associate justice of the District Court of the United States for the District of Columbia.
Gilbert Gude	January 3, 1967 – January 3, 1977	Republican	8th	[data missing]
Samuel Hambleton	March 4, 1869 – March 3, 1873	Democratic	1st	[data missing]
William T. Hamilton	March 4, 1849 – March 3, 1853	Democratic	2nd	[data missing]
William T. Hamilton	March 4, 1853 – March 3, 1855	Democratic	4th	[data missing]
Patrick Hamill	March 4, 1869 – March 3, 1871	Democratic	4th	[data missing]
Edward Hammond	March 4, 1849 – March 3, 1853	Democratic	3rd	[data missing]
Alexander Hanson	March 4, 1813 – ????, 1816	Federalist	3rd	Resigned.
Andrew P. Harris	January 3, 2011 – present	Republican	1st	First elected in 2010. Incumbent.
Benjamin G. Harris	March 4, 1863 – March 3, 1867	Democratic	5th	[data missing]
James M. Harris	March 4, 1855 – March 3, 1861	Know Nothing	3rd	[data missing]
William Hayward Jr.	March 4, 1823 – March 3, 1825	Democratic-Republican (Note: Supported the Crawford faction in the 1824 United States presidential election.)	7th	[data missing]
James P. Heath	March 4, 1833 – March 3, 1835	Jacksonian	4th	[data missing]
Eli J. Henkle	March 4, 1875 – March 3, 1881	Democratic	5th	[data missing]
John C. Herbert	March 4, 1815 – March 3, 1819	Federalist	2nd	[data missing]
Daniel M. Henry	March 4, 1877 – March 3, 1881	Democratic	1st	[data missing]
Winder L. Henry	November 6, 1894 – March 3, 1895	Democratic	1st	[data missing]
Daniel Hiester	March 4, 1801 – March 7, 1804	Democratic-Republican	4th	Died.
John Hill	March 4, 1921 – March 3, 1927	Republican	3rd	[data missing]
Solomon Hillen Jr.	March 4, 1839 – March 3, 1841	Democratic	4th	[data missing]
William Hindman	January 30, 1793 – March 3, 1793	Pro-Administration	2nd	[data missing]
William Hindman	March 4, 1793 – March 3, 1795	Pro-Administration	7th	[data missing]
William Hindman	March 4, 1795 – March 3, 1799	Federalist	7th	[data missing]
Fetter S. Hoblitzell	March 4, 1881 – March 3, 1885	Democratic	3rd	[data missing]
Henry W. Hoffman	March 4, 1855 – March 3, 1857	Know Nothing	5th	[data missing]
Lawrence Hogan	January 3, 1969 – January 3, 1975	Republican	5th	[data missing]
Marjorie Holt	January 3, 1973 – January 3, 1987	Republican	4th	[data missing]
Hart B. Holton	March 4, 1929 – March 3, 1931	Republican	5th	[data missing]
Benjamin C. Howard	March 4, 1829 – March 3, 1833	Jacksonian	5th	[data missing]
Benjamin C. Howard	March 4, 1835 – March 3, 1837	Jacksonian	4th	[data missing]
Benjamin C. Howard	March 4, 1837 – March 3, 1839	Democratic	4th	[data missing]
Steny Hoyer	May 19, 1981 – present	Democratic	5th	First elected in 1981 to finish Gladys Spellman's term. Incumbent.
George W. Hughes	March 4, 1859 – March 3, 1861	Democratic	6th	[data missing]
DeWitt Hyde	January 3, 1953 – January 3, 1959	Republican	6th	[data missing]
Glenn Ivey	January 3, 2023 – present	Democratic	4th	First elected in 2022. Incumbent.
William H. Jackson	March 4, 1901 – March 3, 1905	Republican	1st	[data missing]
William H. Jackson	March 4, 1907 – March 3, 1909	Republican	1st	[data missing]
Daniel Jenifer	March 4, 1831 – March 3, 1833	Anti-Jacksonian	1st	[data missing]
Daniel Jenifer	March 4, 1835 – March 3, 1837	Anti-Jacksonian	7th	[data missing]
Daniel Jenifer	March 4, 1837 – March 3, 1841	Whig	7th	[data missing]
Thomas F. Johnson	January 3, 1959 – January 3, 1963	Democratic	1st	[data missing]
William C. Johnson	March 4, 1833 – March 3, 1835	Anti-Jacksonian	6th	[data missing]
William C. Johnson	March 4, 1837 – March 3, 1843	Whig	5th	[data missing]
Isaac D. Jones	March 4, 1841 – March 3, 1843	Whig	1st	[data missing]
Ambrose J. Kennedy	November 8, 1932 – January 3, 1941	Democratic	4th	[data missing]
John P. Kennedy	April 25, 1838 – March 3, 1839	Whig	4th	[data missing]
John P. Kennedy	March 4, 1841 – March 3, 1845	Whig	4th	[data missing]
Joseph Kent	March 4, 1811 – March 3, 1815	Democratic-Republican (Note: Supported the Adams–Clay faction in the 1824 United States presidential election.)	2nd	[data missing]
Joseph Kent	March 4, 1819 – March 3, 1825	Democratic-Republican	2nd	[data missing]
Joseph Kent	March 4, 1825 – January 6, 1826	Anti-Jacksonian	2nd	Resigned after being elected Governor of Maryland.
John B. Kerr	March 4, 1849 – March 3, 1851	Whig	6th	[data missing]
John Leeds Kerr	March 4, 1825 – March 3, 1829	Anti-Jacksonian	7th	[data missing]
John Leeds Kerr	March 4, 1831 – March 3, 1833	Anti-Jacksonian	7th	[data missing]
Josiah Kerr	November 6, 1900 – March 3, 1901	Republican	1st	[data missing]
Philip Key	March 4, 1791 – March 3, 1793	Democratic-Republican	1st	Elected in 1790. Lost re-election.
Philip Barton Key	March 4, 1807 – March 3, 1813	Federalist	3rd	[data missing]
William Kimmel	March 4, 1877 – March 3, 1881	Democratic	3rd	[data missing]
George Konig	March 4, 1911 – May 31, 1913	Democratic	3rd	[data missing]
Frank Kratovil	January 3, 2009 – January 3, 2011	Democratic	1st	[data missing]
John Kronmiller	March 4, 1909 – March 3, 1911	Republican	3rd	[data missing]
Jacob M. Kunkel	March 4, 1857 – March 3, 1861	Democratic	5th	[data missing]
Richard Lankford	January 3, 1955 – January 3, 1965	Democratic	5th	[data missing]
Cornelius Leary	March 4, 1861 – March 3, 1863	Union	3rd	[data missing]
John Lee	March 4, 1823 – March 3, 1825	Federalist (Note: Supported the Jackson faction in the 1824 United States presidential election.)	4th	[data missing]
David J. Lewis	March 4, 1911 – March 3, 1917	Democratic	6th	[data missing]
David J. Lewis	March 4, 1931 – January 3, 1939	Democratic	6th	[data missing]
Thomas W. Ligon	March 4, 1845 – March 3, 1849	Democratic	3rd	[data missing]
John C. Linthicum	March 4, 1911 – October 5, 1932	Democratic	4th	Died.
Peter Little	March 4, 1811 – March 3, 1813	Democratic-Republican	5th	[data missing]
Peter Little	September 2, 1816 – March 3, 1825	Democratic-Republican	5th	[data missing]
Peter Little	March 4, 1825 – March 3, 1829	Anti-Jacksonian	5th	[data missing]
Edward Lloyd	December 3, 1806 – March 3, 1809	Democratic-Republican	7th	[data missing]
Clarence Long	January 3, 1963 – January 3, 1985	Democratic	2nd	[data missing]
Edward H. C. Long	March 4, 1845 – March 3, 1847	Whig	6th	[data missing]
Lloyd Lowndes Jr.	March 4, 1873 – March 3, 1875	Republican	6th	[data missing]
Hervey Machen	January 3, 1965 – January 3, 1969	Democratic	5th	[data missing]
Patrick Magruder	March 4, 1805 – March 3, 1807	Democratic-Republican	3rd	[data missing]
Robert N. Martin	March 4, 1825 – March 3, 1827	Anti-Jacksonian	8th	[data missing]
John T. Mason Jr.	March 4, 1841 – March 3, 1843	Democratic	6th	[data missing]
Charles Mathias	January 3, 1961 – January 3, 1969	Republican	6th	[data missing]
William Matthews	March 4, 1797 – March 3, 1799	Federalist	6th	[data missing]
Henry May	March 4, 1853 – March 3, 1855	Democratic	5th	[data missing]
Henry May	March 4, 1861 – March 3, 1863	Union	4th	[data missing]
April McClain Delaney	January 3, 2025 – present	Democratic	6th	First elected in 2024. Incumbent.
Louis E. McComas	March 4, 1883 – March 3, 1891	Republican	6th	[data missing]
William McCreery	March 4, 1803 – March 3, 1809	Democratic-Republican	5th	[data missing]
Hiram McCullough	March 4, 1865 – March 3, 1869	Democratic	1st	[data missing]
John McDonald	March 4, 1897 – March 3, 1899	Republican	6th	[data missing]
William W. McIntire	March 4, 1897 – March 3, 1899	Republican	4th	[data missing]
William M. McKaig	March 4, 1891 – March 3, 1895	Democratic	6th	[data missing]
Alexander McKim	March 4, 1809 – March 3, 1815	Democratic-Republican	5th	[data missing]
Isaac McKim	January 4, 1823 – March 3, 1825	Democratic-Republican	5th	[data missing]
Isaac McKim	March 4, 1833 – March 3, 1835	Jacksonian	5th	[data missing] Died.
Isaac McKim	March 4, 1835 – April 1, 1838	Jacksonian	4th	[data missing] Died.
Robert M. McLane	March 4, 1847 – March 3, 1851	Democratic	4th	[data missing]
Robert M. McLane	March 4, 1879 – March 3, 1883	Democratic	4th	[data missing]
Charles T. McMillen	January 3, 1987 – January 3, 1993	Democratic	4th	[data missing]
Hugh Meade	January 3, 1947 – January 3, 1949	Democratic	2nd	[data missing]
John F. Mercer	February 5, 1792 – March 3, 1793	Anti-Administration	3rd	[data missing]
John F. Mercer	March 4, 1793 – April 13, 1794	Anti-Administration	2nd	[data missing]
William M. Merrick	March 4, 1871 – March 3, 1873	Democratic	5th	[data missing]
John A. Meyer	January 3, 1941 – January 3, 1943	Democratic	4th	[data missing]
Kweisi Mfume	January 3, 1987 – February 15, 1996	Democratic	7th	Resigned to become CEO of the NAACP.
Kweisi Mfume	April 28, 2020 – present	Democratic	7th	First elected in 2020. Incumbent.
Barbara Mikulski	January 3, 1977 – January 3, 1987	Democratic	3rd	[data missing]
Joshua W. Miles	March 4, 1895 – March 3, 1897	Democratic	1st	[data missing]
Edward T. Miller	January 3, 1947 – January 3, 1959	Republican	1st	[data missing]
William O. Mills	May 25, 1971 – May 24, 1973	Republican	1st	Died.
George E. Mitchell	March 4, 1823 – March 3, 1825	Democratic-Republican	6th	[data missing]
George E. Mitchell	March 4, 1825 – March 3, 1827	Jacksonian	6th	[data missing]
George E. Mitchell	December 7, 1829 – June 28, 1832	Jacksonian	6th	[data missing] Died.
Parren Mitchell	January 3, 1971 – January 3, 1987	Democratic	7th	[data missing]
John Montgomery	March 4, 1807 – April 29, 1811	Democratic-Republican	6th	Resigned to become Attorney General of Maryland
Nicholas R. Moore	March 4, 1803 – March 3, 1811	Democratic-Republican	5th	[data missing]
Nicholas R. Moore	March 4, 1813 – ????, 1815	Democratic-Republican	5th	Resigned before the convening of the 14th Congress.
Connie Morella	January 3, 1987 – January 3, 2003	Republican	8th	[data missing]
Rogers Morton	January 3, 1963 – January 29, 1971	Republican	1st	Resigned having been appointed United States Secretary of the Interior.
Sydney E. Mudd I	March 20, 1890 – March 3, 1891	Republican	5th	[data missing]
Sydney E. Mudd I	March 4, 1897 – March 3, 1911	Republican	5th	[data missing]
Sydney E. Mudd II	March 4, 1915 – October 11, 1924	Republican	5th	Died.
William V. Murray	March 4, 1791 – March 3, 1793	Pro-Administration	5th	[data missing]
William V. Murray	March 4, 1793 – March 3, 1795	Pro-Administration	8th	[data missing]
William V. Murray	March 4, 1795 – March 3, 1797	Federalist	8th	[data missing]
Raphael Neale	March 4, 1819 – March 3, 1825	Federalist	1st	[data missing]
John Nelson	March 4, 1821 – March 3, 1823	Democratic-Republican	4th	[data missing]
Roger Nelson	November 6, 1804 – May 14, 1810	Democratic-Republican	4th	Resigned to become associate justice of Maryland's 5th judicial circuit.
Joseph H. Nicholson	March 4, 1799 – March 1, 1806	Democratic-Republican	7th	Resigned.
William J. O'Brien	March 4, 1873 – March 3, 1877	Democratic	3rd	[data missing]
Johnny Olszewski	January 3, 2025 – present	Democratic	2nd	First elected in 2024. Incumbent.
Henry Page	March 4, 1891 – September 3, 1892	Democratic	1st	Resigned to become a judge of the Maryland Court of Appeals.
Vincent L. Palmisano	March 4, 1927 – January 3, 1939	Democratic	3rd	[data missing]
Thomas Parran Sr.	March 4, 1911 – March 3, 1913	Republican	5th	[data missing]
James Pearce	March 4, 1835 – March 3, 1839	Whig	2nd	[data missing]
James Pearce	March 4, 1841 – March 3, 1843	Whig	2nd	[data missing]
George A. Pearre	March 4, 1899 – March 3, 1911	Republican	6th	[data missing]
Thomas J. Perry	March 4, 1845 – March 3, 1847	Democratic	2nd	[data missing]
George Peter	October 7, 1816 – March 3, 1819	Federalist	3rd	[data missing]
George Peter	March 4, 1825 – March 3, 1827	Jacksonian	3rd	[data missing]
Charles E. Phelps	March 4, 1865 – March 3, 1867	Unconditional Union	3rd	[data missing]
Charles E. Phelps	March 4, 1867 – March 3, 1869	Conservative	3rd	[data missing]
William Pinkney	March 4, 1791 – November ??, 1791	Pro-Administration	3rd	Resigned.
William Pinkney	March 4, 1815 – April 18, 1816	Democratic-Republican	5th	Resigned to become U.S. Minister Plenipotentiary to Russia.
Thomas Plater	March 4, 1801 – March 3, 1805	Federalist	3rd	[data missing]
Jacob A. Preston	March 4, 1843 – March 3, 1845	Whig	5th	[data missing]
Jesse Price	November 3, 1914 – March 3, 1919	Democratic	1st	[data missing]
Alexander Randall	March 4, 1841 – March 3, 1843	Whig	4th	[data missing]
Jamie Raskin	January 3, 2017 – present	Democratic	8th	First elected in 2016. Incumbent.
Isidor Rayner	March 4, 1887 – March 3, 1889	Democratic	4th	[data missing]
Isidor Rayner	March 4, 1891 – March 3, 1895	Democratic	4th	[data missing]
Philip Reed	March 4, 1817 – March 3, 1819	Democratic-Republican	7th	[data missing]
Philip Reed	March 19, 1822 – March 3, 1823	Democratic-Republican	6th	[data missing]
James B. Ricaud	March 4, 1855 – March 3, 1859	Know Nothing	2nd	[data missing]
Samuel Ringgold	October 15, 1810 – March 3, 1815	Democratic-Republican	4th	[data missing]
Samuel Ringgold	March 4, 1817 – March 3, 1821	Democratic-Republican	4th	[data missing]
John Ritchie	March 4, 1871 – March 3, 1873	Democratic	4th	[data missing]
Charles B. Roberts	March 4, 1875 – March 3, 1879	Democratic	2nd	[data missing]
Dudley Roe	January 3, 1945 – January 3, 1947	Democratic	1st	[data missing]
James D. Roman	March 4, 1847 – March 3, 1849	Whig	2nd	[data missing]
Dutch Ruppersberger	January 3, 2003 – January 3, 2025	Democratic	2nd	First elected in 2002. Retired.
Harry W. Rusk	November 2, 1886 – March 3, 1897	Democratic	3rd	[data missing]
John Sarbanes	January 3, 2007 – January 3, 2025	Democratic	3rd	First elected in 2006. Retired.
Paul Sarbanes	January 3, 1971 – January 3, 1973	Democratic	4th	[data missing]
Paul Sarbanes	January 3, 1973 – January 3, 1977	Democratic	3rd	[data missing]
Lansdale G. Sasscer	February 3, 1939 – January 3, 1953	Democratic	5th	[data missing]
Charles R. Schirm	March 4, 1901 – March 3, 1903	Republican	4th	[data missing]
Benedict J. Semmes	March 4, 1829 – March 3, 1833	Anti-Jacksonian	2nd	[data missing]
Joshua Seney	March 4, 1789 – December 6, 1792	Anti-Administration	2nd	Resigned to become Chief Justice of Maryland's 3rd Judicial District
Charles S. Sewall	October 1, 1832 – March 3, 1833	Jacksonian	6th	[data missing]
Charles S. Sewall	January 2, 1843 – March 3, 1843	Democratic	3rd	[data missing]
Frank T. Shaw	March 4, 1885 – March 3, 1889	Democratic	2nd	[data missing]
Upton Sheredine	March 4, 1791 – March 3, 1793	Anti-Administration	6th	[data missing]
Jacob Shower	March 4, 1853 – March 3, 1855	Democratic	2nd	[data missing]
Carlton R. Sickles	January 3, 1963 – January 3, 1967	Democratic	At-large	[data missing]
Frank Small Jr.	January 3, 1953 – January 3, 1955	Republican	5th	[data missing]
Frank O. Smith	March 4, 1913 – March 3, 1915	Democratic	5th	[data missing]
John W. Smith	March 4, 1899 – January 12, 1900	Democratic	1st	Resigned to become Governor of Maryland.
Samuel Smith	March 4, 1793 – March 3, 1803	Democratic-Republican	5th	[data missing]
Samuel Smith	January 31, 1816 – December 17, 1822	Democratic-Republican	5th	Resigned after being elected to the US Senate.
Thomas A. Smith	March 4, 1905 – March 3, 1907	Democratic	1st	[data missing]
William Smith	March 4, 1789 – March 3, 1791	Anti-Administration	4th	[data missing]
Augustus R. Sollers	March 4, 1841 – March 3, 1843	Whig	7th	[data missing]
Augustus R. Sollers	March 4, 1853 – March 3, 1855	Whig	6th	[data missing]
Gladys Spellman	January 3, 1975 – January 3, 1981	Democratic	5th	[data missing]
John S. Spence	March 4, 1823 – March 3, 1825	Democratic-Republican	8th	[data missing]
Thomas A. Spence	March 4, 1843 – March 3, 1845	Whig	6th	[data missing]
Michael Sprigg	March 4, 1827 – March 3, 1831	Jacksonian	4th	[data missing]
Richard Sprigg Jr.	May 5, 1796 – March 3, 1799	Democratic-Republican	2nd	[data missing]
Richard Sprigg Jr.	March 4, 1801 – February 11, 1802	Democratic-Republican	2nd	Resigned.
Thomas Sprigg	March 4, 1793 – March 3, 1795	Anti-Administration	4th	[data missing]
Thomas Sprigg	March 4, 1795 – March 3, 1797	Democratic-Republican	4th	[data missing]
John N. Steele	May 29, 1834 – March 3, 1837	Anti-Jacksonian	1st	[data missing]
Newton Steers	January 3, 1977 – January 3, 1979	Republican	8th	[data missing]
Samuel Sterett	March 4, 1791 – March 3, 1793	Anti-Administration	4th	[data missing]
John T. Stoddert	March 4, 1833 – March 3, 1835	Jacksonian	8th	[data missing]
Frederick Stone	March 4, 1867 – March 3, 1871	Democratic	5th	[data missing]
Michael J. Stone	March 4, 1789 – March 3, 1791	Anti-Administration	1st	Elected in 1789. Lost re-election.
Henry Stockbridge Jr.	March 4, 1889 – March 3, 1891	Republican	4th	[data missing]
Philip Stuart	March 4, 1811 – March 3, 1819	Federalist	1st	[data missing]
Herman Stump	March 4, 1889 – March 3, 1893	Democratic	2nd	[data missing]
Thomas Swann	March 4, 1869 – March 3, 1873	Democratic	3rd	[data missing]
Thomas Swann	March 4, 1873 – March 3, 1879	Democratic	4th	[data missing]
Joshua F. C. Talbott	March 4, 1879 – March 3, 1885	Democratic	2nd	[data missing]
Joshua F. C. Talbott	March 4, 1893 – March 3, 1895	Democratic	2nd	[data missing]
Joshua F. C. Talbott	March 4, 1903 – October 5, 1918	Democratic	2nd	Died.
Francis Thomas	March 4, 1831 – March 3, 1833	Jacksonian	4th	[data missing]
Francis Thomas	March 4, 1833 – March 3, 1835	Jacksonian	7th	[data missing]
Francis Thomas	March 4, 1835 – March 3, 1837	Jacksonian	6th	[data missing]
Francis Thomas	March 4, 1837 – March 3, 1841	Democratic	6th	[data missing]
Francis Thomas	March 4, 1861 – March 3, 1863	Union	5th	[data missing]
Francis Thomas	March 4, 1863 – March 3, 1867	Unconditional Union	4th	[data missing]
Francis Thomas	March 4, 1867 – March 3, 1869	Republican	4th	[data missing]
John C. Thomas	March 4, 1799 – March 3, 1801	Federalist	2nd	[data missing]
John L. Thomas Jr.	December 4, 1865 – March 3, 1867	Unconditional Union	2nd	[data missing]
Philip F. Thomas	March 4, 1839 – March 3, 1841	Democratic	2nd	[data missing]
Philip F. Thomas	March 4, 1875 – March 3, 1877	Democratic	1st	[data missing]
David Trone	January 3, 2019 – January 3, 2025	Democratic	6th	First elected in 2018. Retired to run for U.S. Senate.
James Turner	March 4, 1833 – March 3, 1837	Jacksonian	3rd	[data missing]
Millard Tydings	March 4, 1923 – March 3, 1927	Democratic	2nd	[data missing]
Milton Urner	March 4, 1879 – March 3, 1883	Republican	6th	[data missing]
Chris Van Hollen	January 3, 2003 – January 3, 2017	Democratic	8th	[data missing]
Archibald Van Horne	March 4, 1807 – March 3, 1811	Democratic-Republican	2nd	[data missing]
Joshua Van Sant	March 4, 1853 – March 3, 1855	Democratic	3rd	[data missing]
Frank C. Wachter	March 4, 1899 – March 3, 1907	Democratic	3rd	[data missing]
Thomas Y. Walsh	March 4, 1851 – March 3, 1853	Whig	4th	[data missing]
William Walsh	March 4, 1875 – March 3, 1879	Democratic	6th	[data missing]
David J. Ward	June 8, 1939 – January 3, 1945	Democratic	1st	[data missing]
Henry Warfield	March 4, 1819 – March 3, 1825	Federalist	3rd	Elected in 1818. Retired.
George Corbin Washington	March 4, 1819 – March 3, 1823	Anti-Jacksonian	3rd	[data missing]
George Corbin Washington	March 4, 1829 – March 3, 1833	Anti-Jacksonian	3rd	[data missing]
George Corbin Washington	March 4, 1835 – March 3, 1837	Anti-Jacksonian	5th	[data missing]
Edwin H. Webster	March 4, 1859 – March 3, 1861	Know Nothing	2nd	[data missing] Resigned to become collector of customs at the port of Baltimore.
Edwin H. Webster	March 4, 1861 – March 3, 1863	Union	2nd	[data missing] Resigned to become collector of customs at the port of Baltimore.
Edwin H. Webster	March 4, 1863 – July ??, 1865	Unconditional Union	2nd	[data missing] Resigned to become collector of customs at the port of Baltimore.
John C. Weems	February 1, 1826 – March 3, 1829	Jacksonian	2nd	[data missing]
George L. Wellington	March 4, 1895 – March 3, 1897	Republican	6th	[data missing]
John Wethered	March 4, 1843 – March 3, 1845	Whig	3rd	[data missing]
James W. Williams	March 4, 1841 – December 2, 1842	Democratic	3rd	Died.
Ephraim K Wilson	March 4, 1827 – March 3, 1829	Anti-Jacksonian	8th	[data missing]
Ephraim K Wilson	March 4, 1829 – March 3, 1831	Jacksonian	8th	[data missing]
Ephraim K. Wilson II	March 4, 1873 – March 3, 1875	Democratic	1st	[data missing]
Harry B. Wolf	March 4, 1907 – March 3, 1909	Democratic	3rd	[data missing]
John T. H. Worthington	March 4, 1831 – March 3, 1833	Jacksonian	5th	[data missing]
John T. H. Worthington	March 4, 1837 – March 3, 1841	Democratic	3rd	[data missing]
Thomas C. Worthington	March 4, 1825 – March 3, 1827	Anti-Jacksonian	4th	[data missing]
Robert Wright	November 29, 1810 – March 3, 1817	Democratic-Republican	7th	[data missing]
Robert Wright	March 4, 1821 – March 3, 1823	Democratic-Republican	7th	[data missing]
Albert Wynn	January 3, 1993 – May 31, 2008	Democratic	4th	Resigned.
Frederick N. Zihlman	March 4, 1917 – March 3, 1931	Republican	6th	[data missing]

== See also ==
- List of United States senators from Maryland
- Maryland's congressional delegations
- Maryland's congressional districts
