= Senator Gale =

Senator Gale may refer to:

- George Gale (Wisconsin politician) (1816–1868), Wisconsin State Senate
- Levin Gale (1784–1834), Maryland State Senate
