= Brick House on the Pike =

Historic house in Maryland, United States

- U.S. National Register of Historic Places
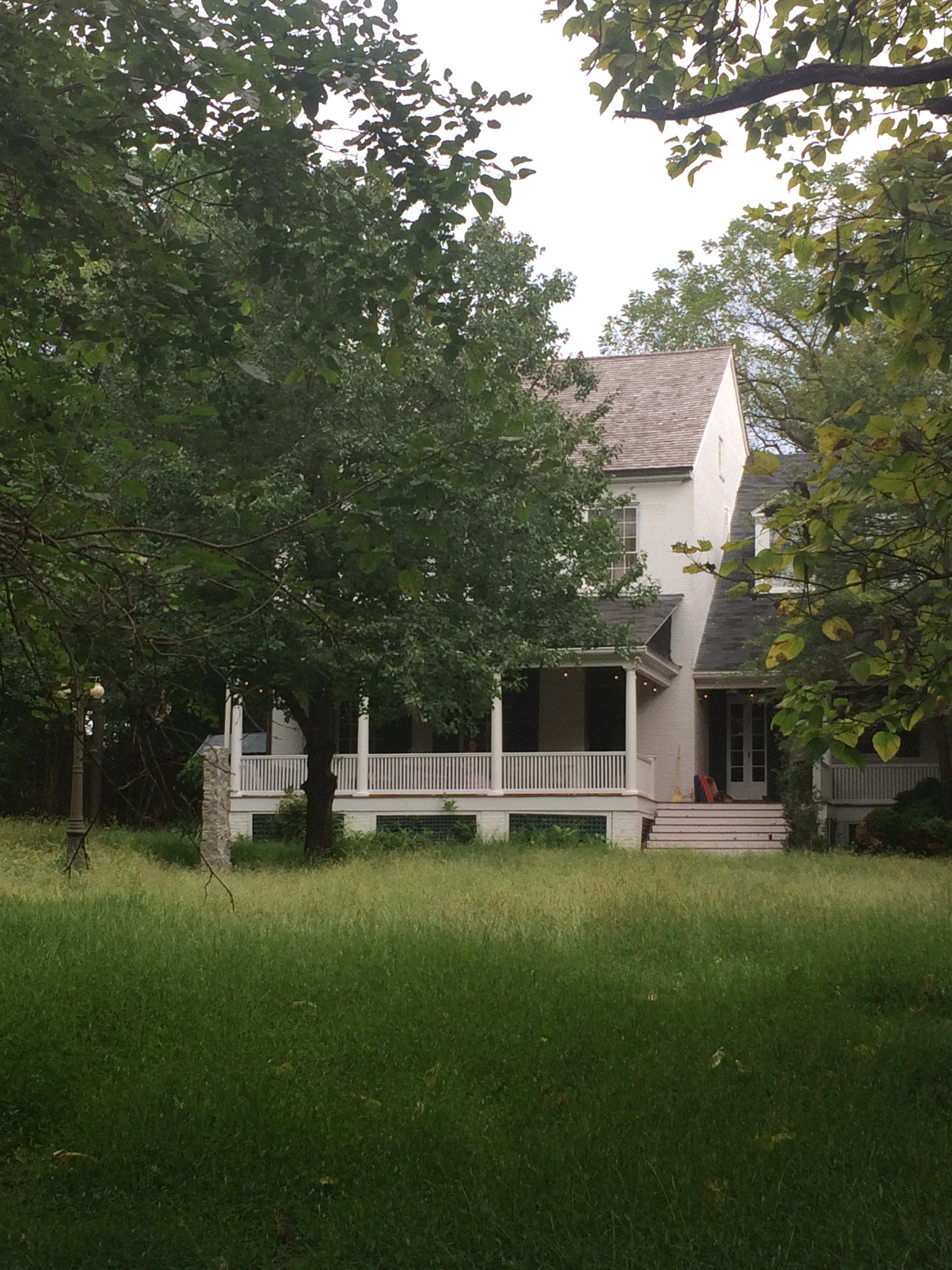

- Location within Maryland Location within the United States
- Location: 9564 Baltimore National Pike, Ellicott City, Maryland
- Coordinates: 39°16′45″N 76°50′38″W
- Area: 3 acres (1.2 ha)
- Built: 1817
- Architectural style: Federal
- NRHP reference No.: 95001522
- Added to NRHP: January 11, 1996

The Brick House on the Pike, Elerslie, Three Brothers is a historic home located at Ellicott City, Howard County, Maryland, United States. It is a large two-story, side-passage, double-pile plan house constructed in two phases, a brick structure built by Caleb Dorsey replacing a wooden structure when he bought the property at the end of the 18th century, and the larger more formal section built by his son Charles Worthington Dorsey about 1817. Also on the property and contemporary with the main house are an ice house foundation, a stone stable or carriage house and three board-and-batten outbuildings dating from the late 19th or early 20th century. The early Federal features of the house were left essentially untouched in the alterations that took place about 1907, and have remained intact. Edward Hammond undertook this modernization after being given the house as a wedding present by the father of his wife, Reubena Rogers. Electricity, central heat, and a capacious front porch were added, and the roof of the older section of the house was raised, creating a full second floor with dormer windows. Public water, sewer, gas, and modernization of utilities were accomplished between 1995 and 2009 by Dr Edward Rogers, a direct descendant of Caleb Dorsey. The previous owners, the Lassotovitch, Hammond, Ligon, and Dorsey families are all related. Governor Thomas Watkins Ligon (1810–1881) of Maryland lived in the house, having married a Dorsey, before they moved to White Hall, nearby.

The Brick House on the Pike was listed on the National Register of Historic Places in 1996.

== See also ==
- List of Howard County properties in the Maryland Historical Trust
