= Maryland's 3rd congressional district =

U.S. House district for Maryland

Coordinates: 39.15°N 76.6°W

- Interactive map of district boundaries since January 3, 2023
- Representative: Sarah Elfreth; D–Annapolis
- Area: 292.74 mi^{2} (758.2 km^{2})
- Distribution: 98.7% urban; 1.3% rural
- Population (2025): 776,445
- Median household income: $136,103
- Ethnicity: 57.0% White; 17.2% Black; 10.9% Asian; 9.0% Hispanic; 5.1% Two or more races; 0.8% other
- Occupation: 71.7% White-collar; 15.7% Blue-collar; 12.5% Gray-collar
- Cook PVI: D+12

Maryland's 3rd congressional district covers all of Howard county as well as parts of Anne Arundel and Carroll counties. The seat is currently represented by Sarah Elfreth, a Democrat. Three people who represented Maryland in the United States Senate were also former representatives of the 3rd district, including Ben Cardin, Barbara Mikulski, and Paul Sarbanes.

The district's previously odd shape was attributed to gerrymandering to favor Democratic candidates, following the 2000 and 2010 censuses. In 2012, the district was found to be the third least compact congressional district in the United States, and in 2014 The Washington Post called it the nation's second-most gerrymandered district. John Sarbanes, the previous Democratic Representative for the district, put forth the For the People Act of 2019 to address electoral reform, voting rights, and gerrymandering in the United States.

Following the 2020 redistricting cycle, it now includes Howard County, most of Anne Arundel County including Glen Burnie and Annapolis, and part of Carroll County, specifically the areas around Mount Airy. For the first time in decades, the district did not include Baltimore City or Baltimore County. It not only lost its connection to Mikulski, Cardin, and Paul Sarbanes, but left John Sarbanes' home outside the district.

== Historical boundaries ==
Maryland's 3rd district was one of the 61 districts that elected a representative to the 1st United States Congress. It also has the distinction of being one of the few congressional districts that once included areas not currently in the state they are in. The 3rd congressional district originally was composed of Prince George's County, Maryland and Anne Arundel County, Maryland. At that point, what is now Howard County, Maryland, was in Anne Arundel County, and Prince George's County included the eastern half of the District of Columbia.

In 1792, the Maryland 3rd Congressional District was moved to include Montgomery County, Maryland, and the eastern half of Frederick County, Maryland. The population was about 33,000. However, the western portion of what is today Carroll County, Maryland was at this point in Frederick County, and the western half of the District of Columbia was in Montgomery County. This latter fact explains why the district lost population, even though it, in theory, did not experience redistricting after the 1800 census. With the population of Georgetown, D. C., no longer in the district, its 1800 population was about 31,000. At this point, the 3rd was Maryland's least populous district, barely having half the population of the Baltimore City and County 5th district, which, in 1800, had just above 59,000 inhabitants.

The boundaries remained the same after the 1810, 1820, and 1830 censuses. While, in 1820, the district had about 36,000 inhabitants, its population had risen to 53,622 in 1830. With the formation of Carroll County in the 1830s, as well as Maryland falling from 8 to 6 congressional seats, the boundaries of the 3rd Congressional District were drastically redrawn. The only area that remained in the 3rd Congressional District was the part of Carroll County that had been in Frederick County. The 3rd also included Baltimore County and the western half of the city of Baltimore. Its new population was 69,923, 24.5% of whom were black.

In 1853, the 3rd district was redrawn again. The new district consisted of Baltimore County, except for the northern and western parts of the county and about the eastern third of the City of Baltimore. The district now had a population of 95,729. In the redistricting following the 1860 census, Maryland was reduced to five congressional districts. The 3rd was moved so that it contained the part of Baltimore that had not been in the 3rd before 1863. It now had a population of 130,040. In 1873, the 3rd district was moved again, to be the east side of Baltimore. It now had a population of 120,978.

== Recent election results from statewide races ==
Year	Office	Results
2008	President	Obama 52% – 46%
2012	President	Obama 54% – 46%
2012	Senate	Cardin 47% – 34%
2014	Governor	Hogan 62% – 38%
2016	President	Clinton 53% – 40%
2016	Senate	Van Hollen 53% – 44%
2018	Senate	Cardin 58% – 35%
2018	Governor	Hogan 64% – 35%
2018	Attorney General	Frosh 58% – 41%
2020	President	Biden 61% – 36%
2022	Senate	Van Hollen 62% – 38%
2022	Governor	Moore 62% – 34%
2022	Comptroller	Lierman 57% – 43%
2022	Attorney General	Brown 61% – 39%
2024	President	Harris 60% – 36%
2024	Senate	Hogan 49.0% – 48.6%

== Composition ==
For the 118th and successive Congresses (based on redistricting following the 2020 census), the district contains all or portions of the following counties and communities:

Anne Arundel County (20)

Annapolis, Annapolis Neck, Arden on the Severn, Arnold, Brooklyn Park, Cape St. Claire, Crownsville, Ferndale, Gambrills, Glen Burnie, Herald Harbor, Jessup (part; also 5th; shared with Howard County), Lake Shore, Linthicum, Odenton (part; also 5th), Pasadena, Parole, Riviera Beach, Severn, Severna Park

Carroll County (2)

Eldersburg (part; also 2nd), Mount Airy (part; also 6th; shared with Frederick County)

Howard County (10)

All 10 communities

== Recent elections ==
=== 2000s ===
Maryland's 3rd Congressional District election, 2000
Party	Candidate	Votes	%
Democratic	Benjamin Cardin (Incumbent)	169,347	75.66
Republican	Scott Conwell	53,827	24.05
Libertarian	Joe Pomykala	238	0.11
Write-ins		406	0.18
Total votes		223,818	100.00
Democratic hold			

Maryland's 3rd Congressional District election, 2002
Party	Candidate	Votes	%
Democratic	Benjamin Cardin (Incumbent)	145,589	65.79
Republican	Scott Conwell	75,721	34.21
Total votes		221,310	100.00
Democratic hold			

Maryland's 3rd Congressional District election, 2004
Party	Candidate	Votes	%	±%
Democratic	Benjamin Cardin (Incumbent)	182,066	63.44%	−2.35
Republican	Robert P. Duckworth	97,008	33.80%	−0.41
Green	Patsy Allen	7,895	2.75%	+2.75
Total votes		286,969	100.00	
Democratic hold				

Marylands's 3rd Congressional District election, 2006
Party	Candidate	Votes	%	±%
Democratic	John Sarbanes	150,142	64.03%	+0.59
Republican	John White	79,174	33.76%	−0.04
Libertarian	Charles Curtis McPeek, Sr.	4,941	2.11%	+2.11
Write-ins		229	0.10%	+0.10
Total votes		234,486	100.00	
Democratic hold				

Maryland's 3rd Congressional District election, 2008
Party	Candidate	Votes	%	±%
Democratic	John Sarbanes (Incumbent)	203,711	69.66%	+5.63
Republican	Thomas E. Harris	87,971	30.08%	−3.68
No party	Write-ins	766	0.26	
Total votes		292,448	100.00	
Democratic hold		Swing		

=== 2010s ===
Maryland's 3rd Congressional District election, 2010
Party	Candidate	Votes	%	±%
Democratic	John Sarbanes (Incumbent)	147,448	61.07%	−8.59
Republican	Jim Wilhelm	86,947	36.01%	+5.93
Libertarian	Jerry McKinley	5,212	2.16%	+2.16
Constitution	Alain Lareau	1,634	0.68%	+0.68
No party	Write-ins	188	0.1%	
Total votes		241,429	100.00	
Democratic hold				

Maryland's 3rd Congressional District election, 2012
Party	Candidate	Votes	%
Democratic	John Sarbanes (Incumbent)	213,747	66.8
Republican	Eric Delano Knowles	94,549	29.6
Libertarian	Paul R. Drgos, Jr.	11,028	3.4
N/A	Others (write-in)	535	0.2
Total votes		319,859	100

Maryland's 3rd congressional district, 2014
Party	Candidate	Votes	%
Democratic	John Sarbanes (incumbent)	128,594	59.6
Republican	Charles A. Long	87,029	40.3
n/a	Write-ins	323	0.1
Total votes		215,946	100.0
Democratic hold			

Maryland's 3rd congressional district, 2016
Party	Candidate	Votes	%
Democratic	John Sarbanes (incumbent)	214,640	63.2
Republican	Mark Plaster	115,048	33.9
Green	Nnabu Eze	9,461	2.8
n/a	Write-ins	526	0.1
Total votes		339,675	100.0
Democratic hold			

Maryland's 3rd congressional district, 2018
Party	Candidate	Votes	%
Democratic	John Sarbanes (incumbent)	202,407	69.1
Republican	Charles Anthony	82,774	28.3
Libertarian	J. David Lashar	7,476	2.6
n/a	Write-ins	223	0.1
Total votes		292,880	100.0
Democratic hold			

=== 2020s ===
Maryland's 3rd congressional district, 2020
Party	Candidate	Votes	%
Democratic	John Sarbanes (incumbent)	260,358	69.8
Republican	Charles Anthony	112,117	30.0
Write-in		731	0.2
Total votes		373,206	100.0
Democratic hold			

Maryland's 3rd congressional district, 2022
Party	Candidate	Votes	%
Democratic	John Sarbanes (incumbent)	175,514	60.2
Republican	Yuripzy Morgan	115,801	39.7
Write-in		287	0.1
Total votes		291,602	100.0
Democratic hold			

Maryland's 3rd congressional district, 2024
Party	Candidate	Votes	%
Democratic	Sarah Elfreth	236,681	59.29
Republican	Robert Steinberger	151,186	37.87
Libertarian	Miguel Barajas	10,471	2.62
Write-in		862	0.22
Total votes		399,200	100.0
Democratic hold			

== List of members representing the district ==
Member	Party	Years	Cong ress	Electoral history	Location
District created March 4, 1789
Benjamin Contee (Charles County)	Anti-Administration	March 4, 1789 – March 3, 1791	1st	Elected in 1789. Lost re-election.	
William Pinkney (Annapolis)	Pro-Administration	March 4, 1791 – November 9, 1791	2nd	Elected in 1790. Resigned due to questions of ineligibility.	
Vacant		November 9, 1791 – February 5, 1792	2nd		
John Francis Mercer (Galesville)	Anti-Administration	February 5, 1792 – March 3, 1793	2nd	Elected October 26–29, 1791 to finish Pinkney's term. Redistricted to the 2nd district.	
Uriah Forrest (Georgetown)	Pro-Administration	March 4, 1793 – November 8, 1794	3rd	Elected in 1792. Re-elected in 1794. Resigned.	
Vacant		November 8, 1794 – January 2, 1795	3rd		
Benjamin Edwards (Montgomery County)	Pro-Administration	January 2, 1795 – March 3, 1795	3rd	Elected to finish Forrest's term. Retired.	
Jeremiah Crabb (Rockville)	Federalist	March 4, 1795 – June 1, 1796	4th	Elected in 1794. Resigned.	
Vacant		June 1, 1796 – December 5, 1796	4th		
William Craik (Baltimore)	Federalist	December 5, 1796 – March 3, 1801	4th 5th 6th	Elected October 3, 1796 to finish Crabb's term. Also elected the same day to the next term. Re-elected in 1798. Retired.	
Thomas Plater (Georgetown)	Federalist	March 4, 1801 – March 3, 1805	7th 8th	Elected in 1801. Re-elected in 1803. Lost re-election.	
Patrick Magruder (Rockville)	Democratic-Republican	March 4, 1805 – March 3, 1807	9th	Elected in 1804. Lost re-election.	
Philip Barton Key (Rockville)	Federalist	March 4, 1807 – March 3, 1813	10th 11th 12th	Elected in 1806. Re-elected in 1808. Re-elected in 1810. Retired.	
Alexander Contee Hanson (Rockville)	Federalist	March 4, 1813 – 1816	13th 14th	Elected in 1812. Re-elected in 1814. Resigned when elected U.S. Senator.	
Vacant		1816 – October 7, 1816	14th		
George Peter (Darnestown)	Federalist	October 7, 1816 – March 3, 1819	14th 15th	Elected to finish Hanson's term. Also elected to the next term in 1816. Lost re-election.	
Henry Ridgely Warfield (Middleburg)	Federalist (Note: Supported the Adams-Clay faction in the 1824 United States presidential election)	March 4, 1819 – March 3, 1825	16th 17th 18th	Elected in 1818. Re-elected in 1820. Re-elected in 1822. Retired.	
George Peter (Darnestown)	Jacksonian	March 4, 1825 – March 3, 1827	19th	Elected in 1824. Lost re-election.	
George Corbin Washington (Rockville)	Anti-Jacksonian	March 4, 1827 – March 3, 1833	20th 21st 22nd	Elected in 1826. Re-elected in 1829. Re-elected in 1831. [data missing]	
James Turner (Wiseburg)	Jacksonian	March 4, 1833 – March 3, 1837	23rd 24th	Elected in 1833. Re-elected in 1835. [data missing]	
John Tolley Hood Worthington (Shawan)	Democratic	March 4, 1837 – March 3, 1841	25th 26th	Elected in 1837. Re-elected in 1839. [data missing]	
James Wray Williams (Churchville)	Democratic	March 4, 1841 – December 2, 1842	27th	Elected in 1841. Died.	
Vacant		December 2, 1842 – January 2, 1843	27th		
Charles S. Sewall (Elkton)	Democratic	January 2, 1843 – March 3, 1843	27th	Elected to finish Williams's term. [data missing]	
John Wethered (Franklin)	Whig	March 4, 1843 – March 3, 1845	28th	Elected late in 1844. [data missing]	
Thomas Watkins Ligon (Ellicotts Mills)	Democratic	March 4, 1845 – March 3, 1849	29th 30th	Elected in 1845. Re-elected in 1847. [data missing]	
Edward Hammond (Ellicotts Mills)	Democratic	March 4, 1849 – March 3, 1853	31st 32nd	Elected in 1849. Re-elected in 1851. [data missing]	
Joshua Van Sant (Baltimore)	Democratic	March 4, 1853 – March 3, 1855	33rd	Elected in 1853. [data missing]	
James Morrison Harris (Baltimore)	Know Nothing	March 4, 1855 – March 3, 1861	34th 35th 36th	Elected in 1855. Re-elected in 1857. Re-elected in 1859. [data missing]	
Cornelius Leary (Baltimore)	Union	March 4, 1861 – March 3, 1863	37th	Elected in 1861. [data missing]	
Henry Winter Davis (Baltimore)	Unconditional Union	March 4, 1863 – March 3, 1865	38th	Elected in 1863. [data missing]	
Charles Edward Phelps (Baltimore)	Unconditional Union	March 4, 1865 – March 3, 1867	39th 40th	Elected in 1864. Re-elected in 1866. [data missing]	
Charles Edward Phelps (Baltimore)	Conservative	March 4, 1867 – March 3, 1869	39th 40th	Elected in 1864. Re-elected in 1866. [data missing]	
Thomas Swann (Baltimore)	Democratic	March 4, 1869 – March 3, 1873	41st 42nd	Elected in 1868. Re-elected in 1870. Redistricted to the 4th district.	
William James O'Brien (Baltimore)	Democratic	March 4, 1873 – March 3, 1877	43rd 44th	Elected in 1872. Re-elected in 1874. [data missing]	
William Kimmel (Baltimore)	Democratic	March 4, 1877 – March 3, 1881	45th 46th	Elected in 1876. Re-elected in 1878. [data missing]	
Fetter Schrier Hoblitzell (Baltimore)	Democratic	March 4, 1881 – March 3, 1885	47th 48th	Elected in 1880. Re-elected in 1882. [data missing]	
William Hinson Cole (Baltimore)	Democratic	March 4, 1885 – July 8, 1886	49th	Elected in 1884. Died.	
Vacant		July 8, 1886 – November 2, 1886	49th		
Harry Welles Rusk (Baltimore)	Democratic	November 2, 1886 – March 3, 1897	49th 50th 51st 52nd 53rd 54th	Elected to finish Cole's term. Re-elected in 1886. Re-elected in 1888. Re-elected in 1890. Re-elected in 1892. Re-elected in 1894. [data missing]	
William Samuel Booze (Baltimore)	Republican	March 4, 1897 – March 3, 1899	55th	Elected in 1896. [data missing]	
Frank Charles Wachter (Baltimore)	Republican	March 4, 1899 – March 3, 1907	56th 57th 58th 59th	Elected in 1898. Re-elected in 1900. Re-elected in 1902. Re-elected in 1904. [data missing]	
Harry Benjamin Wolf (Baltimore)	Democratic	March 4, 1907 – March 3, 1909	60th	Elected in 1906. [data missing]	
John Kronmiller (Baltimore)	Republican	March 4, 1909 – March 3, 1911	61st	Elected in 1908. [data missing]	
George Konig (Baltimore)	Democratic	March 4, 1911 – May 31, 1913	62nd 63rd	Elected in 1910. Re-elected in 1912. Died.	
Vacant		May 31, 1913 – November 4, 1913	63rd		
Charles Pearce Coady (Baltimore)	Democratic	November 4, 1913 – March 3, 1921	63rd 64th 65th 66th	Elected to finish Konig's term. Re-elected in 1914. Re-elected in 1916. Re-elected in 1918. [data missing]	
John B.P.C. Hill (Baltimore)	Republican	March 4, 1921 – March 3, 1927	67th 68th 69th	Elected in 1920. Re-elected in 1922. Re-elected in 1924. [data missing]	
Vincent L. Palmisano (Baltimore)	Democratic	March 4, 1927 – January 3, 1939	70th 71st 72nd 73rd 74th 75th	Elected in 1926. Re-elected in 1928. Re-elected in 1930. Re-elected in 1932. Re-elected in 1934. Re-elected in 1936. [data missing]	
Thomas D'Alesandro Jr. (Baltimore)	Democratic	January 3, 1939 – May 16, 1947	76th 77th 78th 79th 80th	Elected in 1938. Re-elected in 1940. Re-elected in 1942. Re-elected in 1944. Re-elected in 1946. Resigned to become Mayor of Baltimore.	
Vacant		May 16, 1947 – July 15, 1947	80th		
Edward Garmatz (Baltimore)	Democratic	July 15, 1947 – January 3, 1973	80th 81st 82nd 83rd 84th 85th 86th 87th 88th 89th 90th 91st 92nd	Elected to finish D'Alesandro Jr.'s term. Re-elected in 1948. Re-elected in 1950. Re-elected in 1952. Re-elected in 1954. Re-elected in 1956. Re-elected in 1958. Re-elected in 1960. Re-elected in 1962. Re-elected in 1964. Re-elected in 1966. Re-elected in 1968. Re-elected in 1970. [data missing]	
Paul Sarbanes (Baltimore)	Democratic	January 3, 1973 – January 3, 1977	93rd 94th	Redistricted from the 4th district and re-elected in 1972. Re-elected in 1974. Retired to run for U.S. Senator.	1973–1983 [data missing]
Barbara Mikulski (Baltimore)	Democratic	January 3, 1977 – January 3, 1987	95th 96th 97th 98th 99th	Elected in 1976. Re-elected in 1978. Re-elected in 1980. Re-elected in 1982. Re-elected in 1984. Retired to run for U.S. Senator.	1973–1983 [data missing]
Barbara Mikulski (Baltimore)	Democratic	January 3, 1977 – January 3, 1987	95th 96th 97th 98th 99th	Elected in 1976. Re-elected in 1978. Re-elected in 1980. Re-elected in 1982. Re-elected in 1984. Retired to run for U.S. Senator.	1983–1993 [data missing]
Ben Cardin (Baltimore)	Democratic	January 3, 1987 – January 3, 2007	100th 101st 102nd 103rd 104th 105th 106th 107th 108th 109th	Elected in 1986. Re-elected in 1988. Re-elected in 1990. Re-elected in 1992. Re-elected in 1994. Re-elected in 1996. Re-elected in 1998. Re-elected in 2000. Re-elected in 2002. Re-elected in 2004. Retired to run for U.S. Senator.	1983–1993 [data missing]
Ben Cardin (Baltimore)	Democratic	January 3, 1987 – January 3, 2007	100th 101st 102nd 103rd 104th 105th 106th 107th 108th 109th	Elected in 1986. Re-elected in 1988. Re-elected in 1990. Re-elected in 1992. Re-elected in 1994. Re-elected in 1996. Re-elected in 1998. Re-elected in 2000. Re-elected in 2002. Re-elected in 2004. Retired to run for U.S. Senator.	1993–2003 [data missing]
Ben Cardin (Baltimore)	Democratic	January 3, 1987 – January 3, 2007	100th 101st 102nd 103rd 104th 105th 106th 107th 108th 109th	Elected in 1986. Re-elected in 1988. Re-elected in 1990. Re-elected in 1992. Re-elected in 1994. Re-elected in 1996. Re-elected in 1998. Re-elected in 2000. Re-elected in 2002. Re-elected in 2004. Retired to run for U.S. Senator.	2003–2013
John Sarbanes (Baltimore)	Democratic	January 3, 2007 – January 3, 2025	110th 111th 112th 113th 114th 115th 116th 117th 118th	Elected in 2006. Re-elected in 2008. Re-elected in 2010. Re-elected in 2012. Re-elected in 2014. Re-elected in 2016. Re-elected in 2018. Re-elected in 2020. Re-elected in 2022. Retired.	2003–2013
John Sarbanes (Baltimore)	Democratic	January 3, 2007 – January 3, 2025	110th 111th 112th 113th 114th 115th 116th 117th 118th	Elected in 2006. Re-elected in 2008. Re-elected in 2010. Re-elected in 2012. Re-elected in 2014. Re-elected in 2016. Re-elected in 2018. Re-elected in 2020. Re-elected in 2022. Retired.	2013–2023
John Sarbanes (Baltimore)	Democratic	January 3, 2007 – January 3, 2025	110th 111th 112th 113th 114th 115th 116th 117th 118th	Elected in 2006. Re-elected in 2008. Re-elected in 2010. Re-elected in 2012. Re-elected in 2014. Re-elected in 2016. Re-elected in 2018. Re-elected in 2020. Re-elected in 2022. Retired.	2023–present
Sarah Elfreth (Annapolis)	Democratic	January 3, 2025– present	119th	Elected in 2024. Re-elected in 2026.	2023–present

== See also ==
- Maryland's congressional districts
- Gerrymandering
- List of United States congressional districts
