= William Craik (politician) =

American politician (1761–1807)

Member of the U.S. House of Representatives from Maryland's 3rd district
- In office December 5, 1796 – March 3, 1801
- Preceded by: Jeremiah Crabb
- Succeeded by: Thomas Plater

Personal details
- Born: October 31, 1761 Port Tobacco, Charles County, Province of Maryland, British America
- Died: February 9, 1807 (aged 45) Alexandria, District of Columbia, United States
- Party: Federalist
- Spouse: Ann Randolph Fitzhugh
- Occupation: lawyer, judge, politician

William Craik (October 31, 1761 – February 9, 1807) was an American lawyer and planter who served as a United States representative from Maryland and as a state judge.

== Early and family life ==
Born near Port Tobacco, Maryland, the son of prominent physician Dr. James Craik, surgeon of the Continental Army and later President George Washington's personal physician, Craik attended Delamere School in Frederick County and later studied law. He married Ann (1784–1806), daughter of prominent Virginia planter and patriot William Fitzhugh.

== Career ==
Admitted to the bar, Craik commenced practice in Port Tobacco and Leonardtown. In 1788, he was a delegate to the states convention that ratified the U.S. Constitution.

Craik also farmed in Charles County using enslaved labor, owning 23 slaves in Charles County in 1790. He moved to Baltimore and was appointed chief justice of the fifth judicial district of Maryland on January 13, 1793, and served until his resignation in 1796.

Craik was elected as a Federalist to the Fourth Congress to fill the vacancy caused by the resignation of Jeremiah Crabb; he was reelected to the Fifth and Sixth Congresses and served from December 5, 1796, to March 3, 1801; again appointed chief justice of the fifth judicial district of Maryland and served from October 20, 1801, to January 28, 1802. During this time he resided in Frederick, Maryland,

== Death and legacy ==
He died in Alexandria, Virginia in 1807, months after his wife, and was buried at her father's estate in nearby Fairfax County.

U.S. House of Representatives
Preceded by Jeremiah Crabb	Member of the U.S. House of Representatives from Maryland's 3rd congressional district 1796–1801	Succeeded by Thomas Plater
