= John Wethered =

American politician

Member of the U.S. House of Representatives from Maryland's 3rd district
- In office March 4, 1843 – March 3, 1845
- Preceded by: Charles S. Sewall
- Succeeded by: Thomas Watkins Ligon

Personal details
- Born: May 8, 1809 Baltimore County, Maryland, U.S.
- Died: February 15, 1888 (aged 78) Catonsville, Maryland, U.S.
- Resting place: Green Mount Cemetery
- Party: Whig

John Wethered (May 8, 1809 – February 15, 1888) was a U.S. representative from Maryland.

== Early life ==
John Wethered was born on May 8, 1809, in Baltimore County, Maryland. He completed preparatory studies.

== Career ==
Wethered held several local offices, and engaged in the manufacture of woolen goods at Wetheredville, which was later renamed Dickeyville and incorporated into Baltimore City.

Wethered was elected as a Whig to the Twenty-eighth Congress (March 4, 1843 – March 3, 1845). He was nominated as the Whig candidate for the Thirty-third Congress, but lost to Jacob Shower. After his tenure in Congress, he resumed the manufacture of woolen goods. He also served as delegate from Baltimore County to the State convention which framed the Constitution of Maryland in 1867. He retired from active pursuits in 1868 and lived on his estate, "Ashland", near Catonsville, Maryland.

== Death ==
Wethered died at Ashland on February 15, 1888. He is interred in Green Mount Cemetery in Baltimore, Maryland.

U.S. House of Representatives
Preceded by Charles S. Sewall	Member of the U.S. House of Representatives from Maryland's 3rd congressional district 1843–1845	Succeeded by Thomas Watkins Ligon
