= Carlton R. Sickles =

American politician (1921–2004)

Carlton Sickles
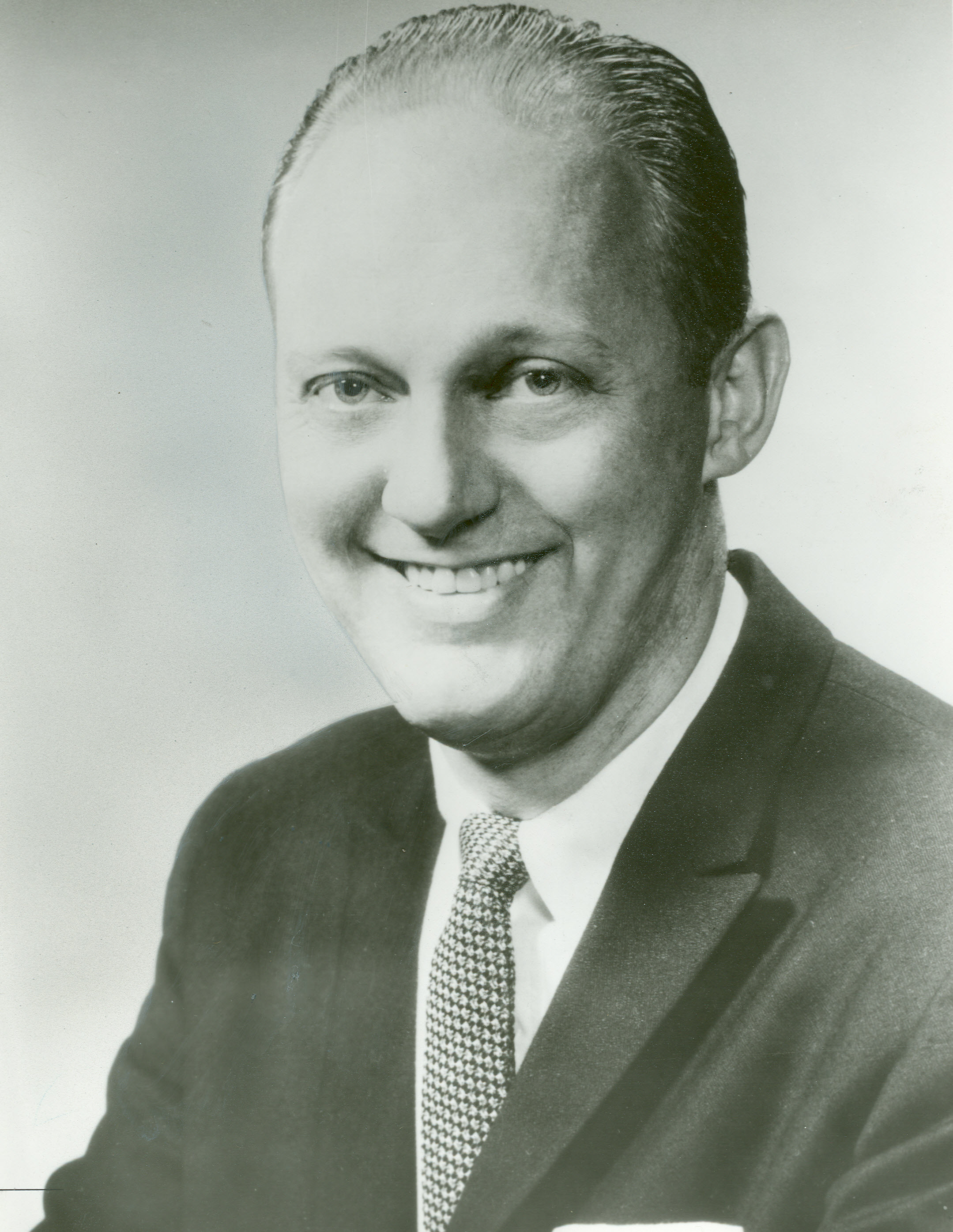

Member of the U.S. House of Representatives from Maryland's at-large congressional district
- In office January 3, 1963 – January 3, 1967

Personal details
- Born: Carlton Ralph Sickles; June 15, 1921 Hamden, Connecticut, U.S.
- Died: January 17, 2004 (aged 82) Bethesda, Maryland, U.S.
- Party: Democratic

Carlton Ralph Sickles (June 15, 1921 – January 17, 2004) was an American lawyer and liberal Congressman from Maryland's at-large congressional seat.

Sickles was born in Hamden, Connecticut. Upon graduating from Georgetown in 1943, Sickles entered the U.S. Army and served until the end of World War II. He returned home to study law and was admitted to the bar in 1948. In addition to practicing law, Sickles taught at the Georgetown University Law School (1960–1966), and served in the Maryland House of Delegates (1955–1962). He was instrumental in the creation of the Washington Metropolitan Area Transit Authority.

In 1962, Sickles ran for the U.S. Congress as a Democrat and won. He served two terms in the House from 1963 to 1967. Sickles voted in favor of the Civil Rights Act of 1964 and the Voting Rights Act of 1965. In 1966, he ran for Governor of Maryland, but lost. In 1967, he was a delegate in Maryland's Constitutional Convention. He made an unsuccessful bid to return to Congress in 1986. Sickles died from heart problems in 2004 at his home in Bethesda and is buried in the George Washington Cemetery at Adelphi, Maryland. The Carlton R. Sickles Memorial Sky Bridge is named after him.

U.S. House of Representatives
Preceded by At-large district created	Member of the U.S. House of Representatives from Maryland's at-large congressional seat January 3, 1963 – January 3, 1967	Succeeded by At-large district eliminated
