= William Cost Johnson =

American politician

William Cost Johnson (January 14, 1806 – April 14, 1860) was an American politician.

Johnson was born near Jefferson, Maryland, and studied law. He was admitted to the bar in 1831 and commenced practice in Jefferson. Johnson served as a member of the Maryland House of Delegates in 1831 and 1832, and was elected as an Anti-Jacksonian to the Twenty-third Congress, serving from March 4, 1833, to March 3, 1835. He was also a delegate to the State constitutional convention in 1850.

Johnson was elected as a Whig to the Twenty-fifth, Twenty-sixth, and Twenty-seventh Congresses, serving from March 4, 1837, to March 3, 1843. In Congress, he served as chairman of the Committee on the District of Columbia (Twenty-sixth Congress), and as a member of the Committee on Public Lands (Twenty-seventh Congress). After Congress, he continued the practice of his profession until his death in Washington, D.C.. He is interred in the Reformed Church Cemetery in Jefferson.

Party political offices
| Preceded by John Nevett Steele | Whig nominee for Governor of Maryland; 1841 | Succeeded by Thomas Pratt |
U.S. House of Representatives
| Preceded by Charles S. Sewall | Member of the U.S. House of Representatives from Maryland's 6th congressional district 1833–1835 | Succeeded by Francis Thomas |
| Preceded by George Corbin Washington | Member of the U.S. House of Representatives from Maryland's 5th congressional district 1837–1843 | Succeeded by Jacob A. Preston |
