= Edward Hammond (politician) =

American politician

Edward Hammond (March 17, 1812 – October 19, 1882) was an American Democratic Party politician.

Hammond was born at "Font Hill" near Ellicott City, Maryland. He attended the common schools, Rockhill Academy, and later graduated from Yale College in 1830. He studied law in New Haven, Connecticut and in Baltimore, Maryland, was admitted to the bar in 1833, and commenced practice in Annapolis, Maryland. He served in the Maryland House of Delegates from Anne Arundel County in 1839, 1841, and 1842, and also served as a member of the Maryland Senate in 1848.

In 1848, Hammond was elected as a Democrat to the Thirty-first and Thirty-second Congresses, serving from March 4, 1849, to March 3, 1853. In Congress, he served as chairman of the Committee on Engraving (the functions of which were later taken by the Committee on Printing). He was not a candidate for renomination in 1852, but was later re-elected to the House of Delegates from Howard County in 1861 and 1867. He was later elected associate judge of the fifth judicial district Maryland in 1867, and was serving in that position when he died at "Font Hill", near Ellicott City. He is interred in St. John's Cemetery near Ellicott City.

U.S. House of Representatives
Preceded by Thomas Watkins Ligon	Member of the U.S. House of Representatives from Maryland's 3rd congressional district 1849–1853	Succeeded by Joshua Van Sant
