= Charles S. Sewall =

American politician

Member of the U.S. House of Representatives from Maryland's 3rd district
- In office January 2, 1843 – March 3, 1843
- Preceded by: James Wray Williams
- Succeeded by: John Wethered

Member of the U.S. House of Representatives from Maryland's 6th district
- In office October 1, 1832 – March 3, 1833
- Preceded by: George Edward Mitchell
- Succeeded by: William Cost Johnson

Member of the Maryland State Senate
- In office 1826–1830

Member of the Maryland House of Delegates
- In office 1815–1817, 1823, 1825

Personal details
- Born: Charles Smith Sewall; 1779 Queen Anne's County, Maryland, U.S.
- Died: November 3, 1848 (aged 68–69) Harford County, Maryland, U.S.
- Spouse: Anna Catherine
- Children: 6
- Military career
- Allegiance: USA
- Branch: Maryland Militia
- Rank: Corporal
- Unit: Forty-second Regiment
- Conflicts: War of 1812

Charles Smith Sewall (1779 – November 3, 1848) was an American politician from Maryland who served in the Maryland State Senate and House of Delegates as well as the U. S. House of Representatives.

== Early life ==
Charles Smith Sewall was born in Queen Anne's County, Maryland in 1779, to Clement and Cornelia (née Smith) Sewall. He attended the common schools and St. John's College in Annapolis.

== Career ==
Sewall served in the Forty-second Regiment of the Maryland Militia as a corporal in 1813, during the War of 1812, and served in the Maryland House of Delegates, representing Harford County from 1815 to 1817, 1823 and 1825. He was a member of the Maryland State Senate, representing the western shore, from 1826 to 1830. He served as the state commissioner of the Pennsylvania and Maryland Canal Company in 1827.

He was elected as a Jacksonian to the Twenty-second Congress to fill the vacancy caused by the death of George E. Mitchell and served from October 1, 1832, to March 3, 1833. He was again elected as a Democrat to the Twenty-seventh Congress to fill the vacancy which was caused by the death of James W. Williams, and served from January 2 to March 3, 1843. He moved to Harford County, Maryland.

== Personal life ==
Sewall married Anna Catherine. They had six children: Charles S. Jr., Edwin Augustus, Jacob Keazy, Septimus Davidge, James Monroe and Ann Maria.

Sewall died at Rose Hill in Harford County on November 3, 1848.

U.S. House of Representatives
Preceded by George Edward Mitchell	Member of the U.S. House of Representatives from Maryland's 6th congressional district 1832–1833	Succeeded by William Cost Johnson
Preceded by James Wray Williams	Member of the U.S. House of Representatives from Maryland's 3rd congressional district 1843	Succeeded by John Wethered
