= White Hall (Ellicott City, Maryland) =

Historic house in Maryland, United States

- U.S. National Register of Historic Places
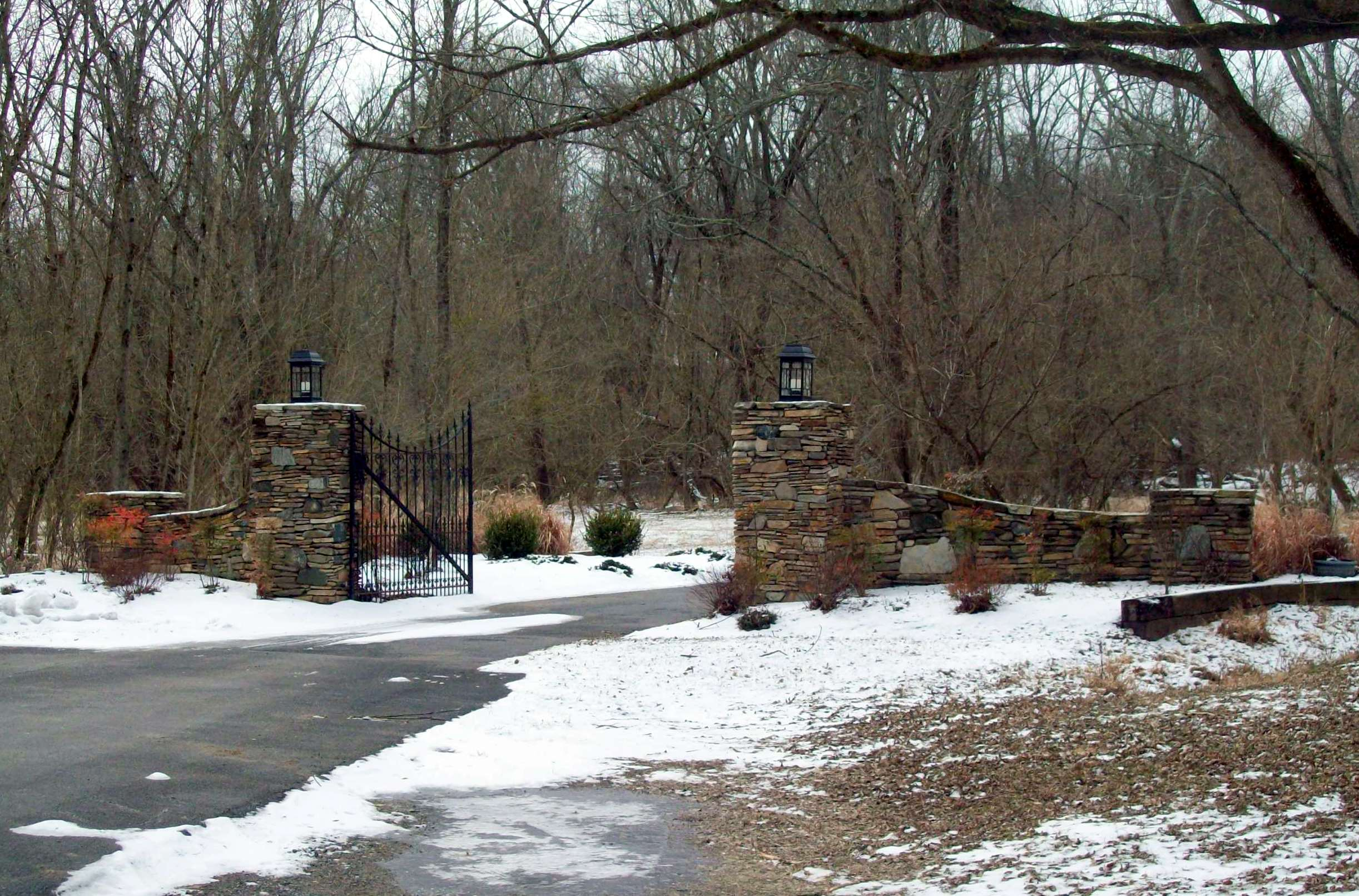
- Gates to White Hall, January 2011

- Location within Maryland Location within the United States
- Location: 4130 Chatham Rd., Ellicott City, Maryland
- Coordinates: 39°15′29″N 76°50′12″W
- Area: 41.3 acres (16.7 ha)
- Architectural style: Federal
- NRHP reference No.: 77000698
- Added to NRHP: August 12, 1977

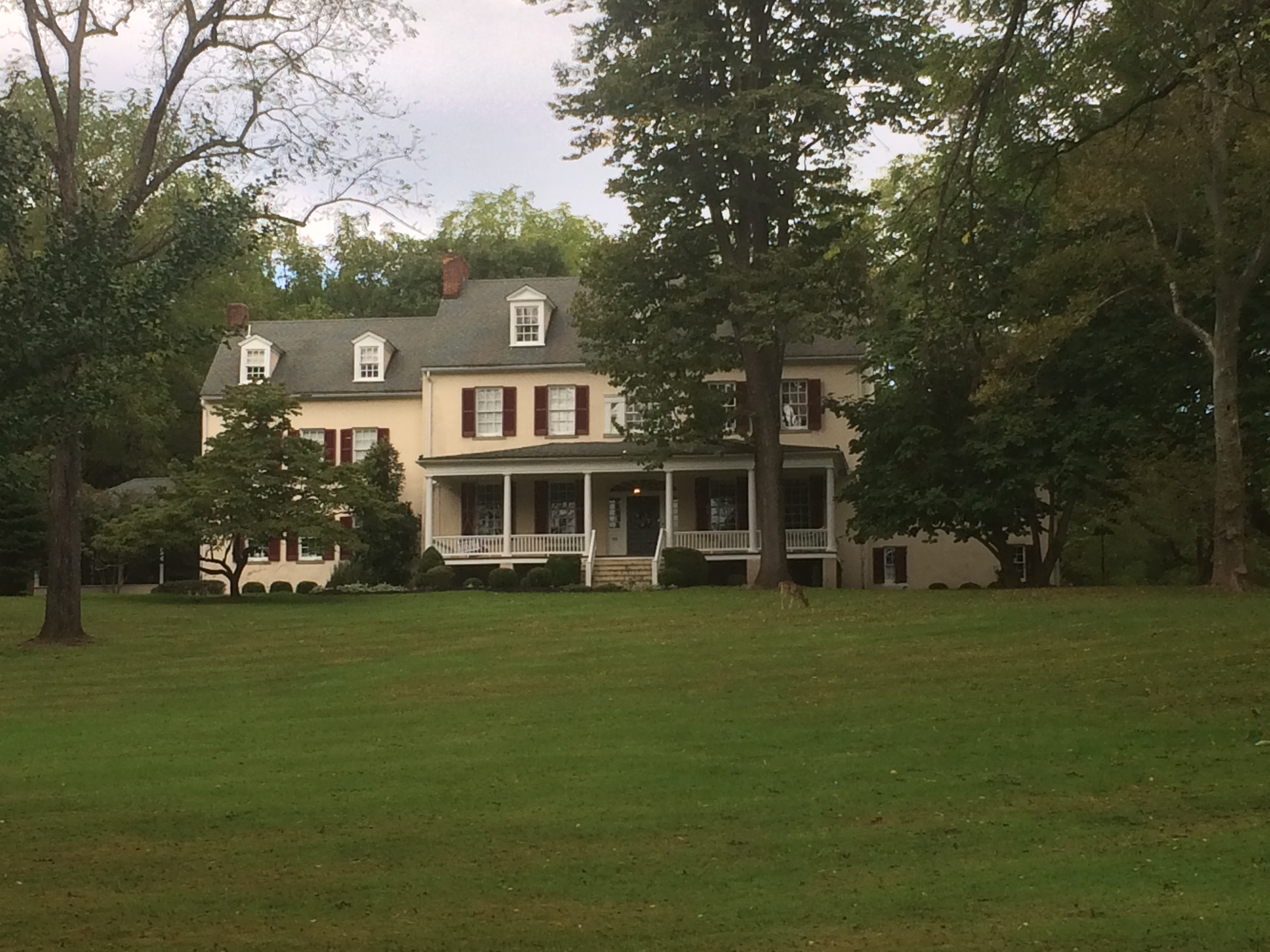
White Hall in 2018

White Hall is a historic home located in Ellicott City, Maryland, United States. It consists of three sections: the east wing, dating from the early 19th century; the center section; and the west wing. In 1890 the house was partially destroyed by fire and rebuilt in 1900. Three outbuildings remain on the White Hall property: a small square frame workshop, a smokehouse-privy, and a springhouse .

White Hall was listed on the National Register of Historic Places in 1977.

Early owners were Caleb Dorsey and his brother Charles Worthington Dorsey, the first County commissioner of the Howard District of Anne Arundel County. Charles Worthington purchased the home in 1828 from Alfred and Ann Dashiel and N.G. Ridgley. With an original building onsite. He built additions to the home in 1857, hiring the architect Nathan G. Starkweather. The home was given to Dorsey's daughter and Maryland Governor Thomas Watkins Ligon. Charles Worthington died at the residence on 26 May 1864. Governor Ligon died at the estate in 1881. The house has been passed down throughout the family for well over one hundred years. Cared for and owned by the Ligon and Hains family (the Ligon and Hains family wed in 1930). In 1965, Col. Thomas Watkins Ligon sold 350 acres (140 ha) of surrounding land, leaving 41.3 acres (16.7 ha) surrounding the property. The Hains family kept the estate until the late 1990s when it was sold to the first non-family member. In 1976 a 41.3-acre easement of the property was registered to the Maryland Historical Trust.

== See also ==
- List of Howard County properties in the Maryland Historical Trust
- Gray Rock (Ellicott City, Maryland)
