= Jeremiah Crabb =

American politician (1760–1800)

Member of the U.S. House of Representatives from Maryland's 3rd district
- In office March 4, 1795 – June 1, 1796
- Preceded by: Benjamin Edwards
- Succeeded by: William Craik

Personal details
- Born: 1760 Frederick County, Province of Maryland, British America
- Died: February 19, 1800 (aged 39–40) Derwood, Maryland, U.S.
- Party: Federalist
- Spouse: Elizabeth Ridgely Griffith
- Parent: Henry Wright Crabb

Military service
- Allegiance: Maryland
- Branch/service: 1st Maryland Regiment
- Years of service: 1776–1778
- Rank: General
- Battles/wars: American Revolutionary War

Jeremiah Crabb (1760 – February 19, 1800) was a United States representative from Maryland.

Jeremiah Crabb was born in the Province of Maryland in 1760, the son of Henry Wright Crabb. He served in the American Revolutionary War as second lieutenant in the First Maryland Regiment. He was promoted to the rank of first lieutenant on December 15, 1777. General George Washington noted Lieutenant Crabb's service and recommended his promotion to general. Crabb served until April 1, 1778. He resigned on that day because of ill health occasioned by the winter hardships endured at Valley Forge.

In 1794, Crabb was a Brigadier General of the Maryland Militia. Crabb served with General Harry Lee in Pennsylvania during the Whiskey Rebellion.

Crabb was elected as a Federalist to the Fourth Congress and served from March 4, 1795, until his resignation after June 1, 1796. He returned to his home near Rockville, Maryland, and died there in 1800. He was buried in the family burial site in Derwood.

General Crabb was married to Elizabeth Ridgely Griffith (1764–1828).

U.S. House of Representatives
Preceded by Benjamin Edwards	Member of the U.S. House of Representatives from Maryland's 3rd congressional district 1795–1796	Succeeded by William Craik
