= George Edward Mitchell =

American politician

George Edward Mitchell (March 3, 1781 – June 28, 1832) was an American medical doctor and politician who served two terms in the United States House of Representatives from Maryland from 1823 to 1827.

== Biography ==
Born at present-day Elkton, Maryland, Mitchell completed preparatory studies and graduated from the medical department of the University of Pennsylvania in Philadelphia on June 5, 1805. He practiced medicine in Elkton from 1806 to 1812. He was elected to the Maryland House of Delegates in 1808, and served as member of the executive council of Maryland, and as president of the council from 1809 to 1812. He served in the War of 1812 with the Third Maryland Artillery, and resigned June 1, 1821.

== Congress ==
Mitchell was elected from the sixth district of Maryland to the Eighteenth and Nineteenth Congresses, and served from March 4, 1823, to March 3, 1827. He was not a candidate for renomination in 1826, and was an unsuccessful candidate for the governorship in 1829. He was elected from the sixth district as a Jacksonian to the Twenty-first and Twenty-second Congresses and served from December 7, 1829, until his death.

== Death and burial ==
He died in Washington, D.C. on June 28, 1832 and is interred in the Congressional Cemetery.

== See also ==
- List of members of the United States Congress who died in office (1790–1899)

U.S. House of Representatives
Preceded by Philip Reed	Representative of the 6th Congressional District of Maryland; 1823–1827	Succeeded by Levin Gale
Preceded by Levin Gale	Representative of the 6th Congressional District of Maryland; 1829–1832	Succeeded by Charles S. Sewall
