= Maryland's at-large congressional district =

Congressional seat from 1963 to 1967

- Obsolete district
- Created: 1960
- Eliminated: 1967
- Years active: 1963-1967

After the 1960 census, Maryland was apportioned an eighth representative, an increase of one over its 1950 to 1960 apportionment. From 1963 to 1967, the state kept the seven districts it had used since 1953 and used an at-large representative. After 1967, however, eight districts were drawn and the at-large district was eliminated.

Democrat Carlton R. Sickles was the sole at-large representative.

== List of members representing the district ==
Member	Party	Years	Congress	Electoral history
District created January 3, 1963
Carlton R. Sickles (Lanham)	Democratic	January 3, 1963 – January 3, 1967	88th 89th	Elected in 1962. Re-elected in 1964. Retired to run for Governor of Maryland.
District eliminated January 3, 1967
