= Thomas Watkins Ligon =

American politician (1810-1881)

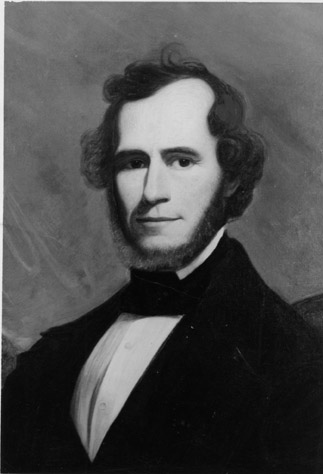

30th Governor of Maryland
- In office January 11, 1854 – January 13, 1858
- Preceded by: Enoch Louis Lowe
- Succeeded by: Thomas H. Hicks

Member of the U.S. House of Representatives from Maryland's 3rd district
- In office March 4, 1845 – March 3, 1849
- Preceded by: John Wethered
- Succeeded by: Edward Hammond

Member of the Maryland House of Delegates
- In office 1843–1845

Personal details
- Born: May 10, 1810 Farmville, Virginia, US
- Died: January 12, 1881 (aged 70) Howard County, Maryland, US
- Party: Democratic
- Spouse: Sally Ann Dorsey (m. 1840, her death) Mary Tolly Dorsey (m. 1840–1881, (his death)
- Education: Hampden–Sydney College; University of Virginia; Yale Law School

Thomas Watkins Ligon (May 10, 1810 – January 12, 1881) was an American politician who served as the 30th governor of Maryland from 1854 to 1858. He was also a member of the United States House of Representatives, serving third congressional district from 1845 until 1849. He was the second Maryland governor born in Virginia and was a minority party governor, who faced bitter opposition from an openly hostile legislature.

He was a member of the Democratic Party.

== Biography ==
Thomas Watkins Ligon was born on May 10, 1810, near Farmville, Virginia, the son of Thomas D. Ligon and Martha Watkins. He graduated from Hampden–Sydney College, then entered the University of Virginia. He graduated from Yale Law School and returned to Virginia where he was admitted to the bar. In 1833, he moved to Baltimore, Maryland where he practiced law for the next 20 years. On September 29, 1840, he married Sally Ann Dorsey and made his home in Ellicott City, Maryland. Mrs. Ligon died shortly after their marriage and he married her sister, Mary Tolly Dorsey. He had one son and one daughter.

In 1843, he was elected to a seat in the Maryland House of Delegates from Howard County and in 1845, the Democrats nominated him for Congress. He defeated the incumbent John Wethered by a majority of about 1,000 votes, and was re-elected by a larger margin in 1847. He served in the Twenty-Ninth and Thirtieth Congresses, taking his seat on December 1, 1845 and retiring on March 3, 1849.

In the gubernatorial election of 1853, the Whigs nominated Richard Johns Bowie of Montgomery County to face Ligon, who had been nominated by the Democrats. Ligon defeated his opponent by about 4,200 votes, but he and his party were in the minority in the Legislature. He was inaugurated on January 11, 1854, and he pledged himself to work for the establishment of a system of common schools, the improvement of Maryland’s soils, and increased aid to agriculture. All these were shortly forgotten, when he and his 'Know-Nothing' opponents in the Legislature came into conflict. He supported the foundation of an agricultural college with an experimental farm attached, a step which the Legislature later took when it established the old Maryland Agricultural College at College Park. The Know-Nothing Riot of 1856 occurred during his term.

On January 13, 1858, following the election of his 'Know-Nothing' successor Thomas Holliday Hicks, Ligon retired to his Howard County estate 'Chatham' near Ellicott City. He died at his home on January 12, 1881, and was buried in the family cemetery.

== Legacy ==
Ligon Road in the Ellicott City neighborhood of Dunloggin presumably bears his name. He once resided in the Brick House on the Pike, listed on the National Register of Historic Places in 1996. He also resided at White Hall, listed on the National Register of Historic Places in 1977.

Party political offices
Preceded by Enoch Louis Lowe	Democratic nominee for Governor of Maryland; 1853	Succeeded by John C. Groome
U.S. House of Representatives
Preceded by John Wethered	U.S. Representative for Maryland's 3rd Congressional District; 1845–1849	Succeeded by Edward Hammond
Political offices
Preceded by Enoch Louis Lowe	Governor of Maryland; 1854–1858	Succeeded by Thomas H. Hicks
