= Levin Gale =

American politician

Levin Gale (April 24, 1784 – December 18, 1834) was an American politician. Born in Elkton, Maryland, Gale attended the common schools, studied law, and was admitted to the bar and practiced in Elkton. He was member of the Maryland State Senate in 1816, and was elected from the sixth district of Maryland as a Jacksonian candidate to the Twentieth Congress, and served from March 4, 1827, to March 3, 1829. He declined to be a candidate for renomination in 1828, and resumed the practice of law. He died in Elkton.

His father, George Gale, was also a Congressman from Maryland.

U.S. House of Representatives
Preceded by George Edward Mitchell	Representative of the 6th Congressional District of Maryland; 1827–1829	Succeeded by George Edward Mitchell
