= Makemie Memorial Presbyterian Church =

Historic church in Maryland, US

- U.S. National Register of Historic Places
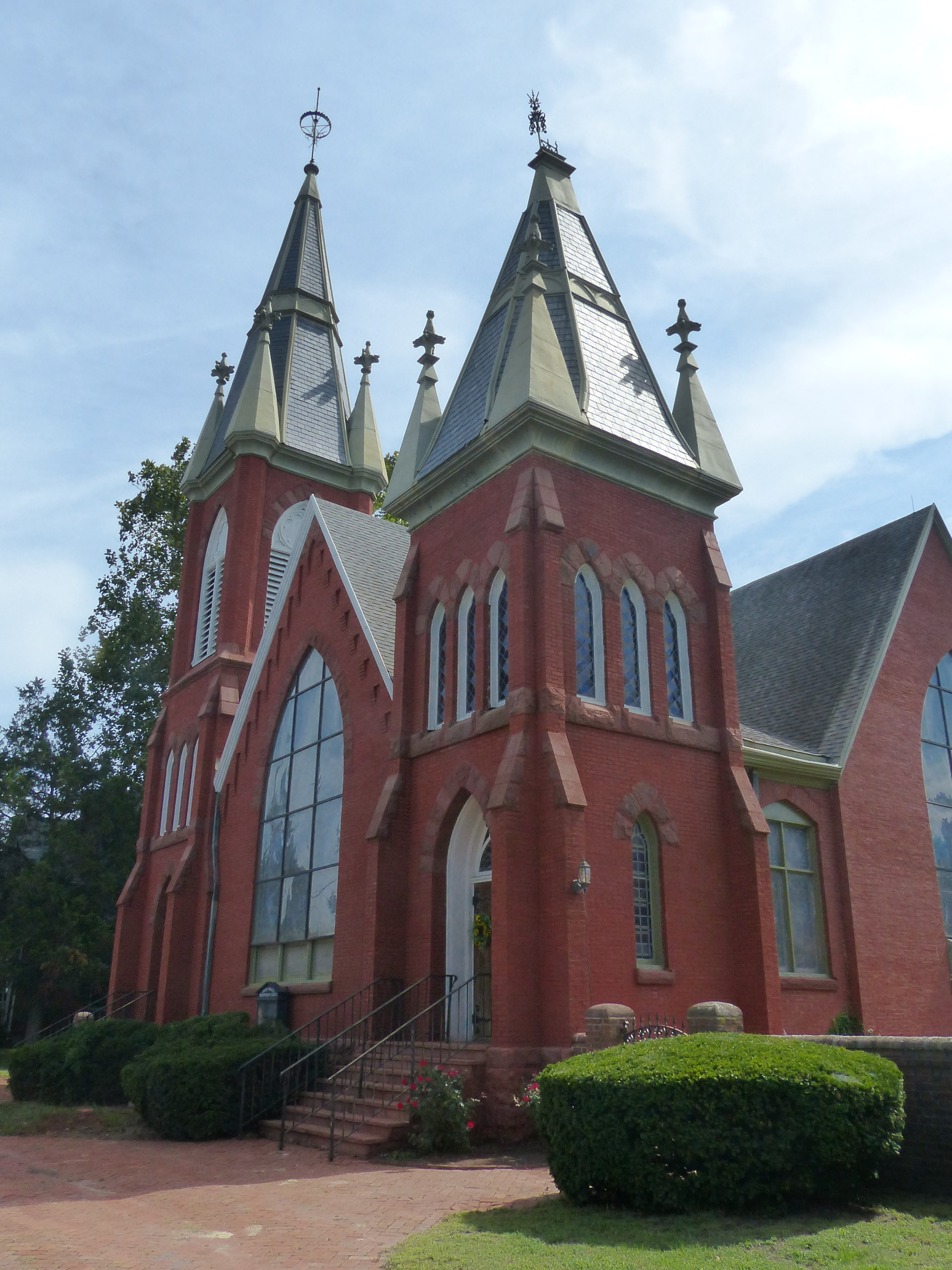

- Location within Maryland Location within the United States
- Nearest city: 103 W Market Street, Snow Hill, Maryland
- Coordinates: 38°10′34″N 75°23′38″W
- Area: 1.1 acres (0.45 ha)
- Built: 1888
- Architect: Isaac Pursell
- Architectural style: Gothic
- NRHP reference No.: 08001044
- Added to NRHP: November 10, 2008

Makemie Memorial Presbyterian Church is a historic Presbyterian church located in Snow Hill, Worcester County, Maryland.

== History ==
The church was established by immigrants from England, Scotland, and Ulster. Makemie Memorial is generally regarded as being the first church in America to issue a call to a pastor, although others say that the call was actually issued through an Anglican, William Stevens, and that Rev. Francis Makemie (1658 – 1708) actually first preached near Stevens' home parish, Coventry Parish further south in Rehoboth and established Rehobeth Presbyterian Church before this community.

The original church building was a log structure located within a block of the Pocomoke River, which in 1683 was the main means of travel in the area given the vast wet-lands in Worcester County. The second structure was a frame building built on the current property on West Market Street, but it was built close to the center of the grave yard on the top of the little rise. That building burned and was replaced by a brick structure on the same spot. That building served for a number of years until it too was damaged by fire. In 1883, for the 200th anniversary of the organization of the church, it was resolved to build a Makemie Memorial Church in honor of Reverend Makemie.

The present building designed by noted Philadelphia architect Isaac Pursell. It was started in 1887 and dedicated on June 29, 1890. Two other churches with similar names were established around the same time in Accomac, Virginia, near where Rev. Makemie spent his final years and died.

It is a Gothic Revival structure built of red brick with red sandstone trim. There are five memorial windows in the sanctuary and the vaulted ceiling is supported by hand-hewn, exposed wooded arches. It has two unequal tall towers. There is an adjacent graveyard to the church.

It was listed on the National Register of Historic Places in 2008.

== Notable interments ==
- John Rankin Franklin (1820–1878), U.S. Representative and member of the Maryland House of Delegates
- John P. Moore (1856–1918), member of the Maryland Senate and mayor of Snow Hill
- John Walter Smith (1845–1925), Governor of Maryland
- George M. Upshur (1847–1924), Maryland delegate, mayor of Ocean City, Maryland
- Ephraim King Wilson (1771–1834), U.S. Representative from Maryland
- Ephraim King Wilson II (1821–1891), U.S. Senator from Maryland
