= Upshur =

Upshur may refer to:

== Places ==
- Upshur County, Texas, county located in the U.S. state of Texas
- Upshur County, West Virginia, county located in the U.S. state of West Virginia

== People ==
=== Surname ===
- Abel P. Upshur (1790–1844), American lawyer, Secretary of the Navy and Secretary of State
- Franklin Upshur (1875–1965), American politician and lawyer
- George M. Upshur (1847–1924), American politician and lawyer
- George P. Upshur (1799–1852), officer in the United States Navy, brother of Abel P. Upshur
- John Henry Upshur (1823–1917), admiral in the United States Navy in the Mexican-American War and American Civil War
- Ross Upshur, FRCPC, Canadian physician and researcher
- William P. Upshur (1881–1943), recipient of the Medal of Honor—for actions in 1915 during the Haitian Campaign
- William A. Upshur (1894 – 1963), member of the Pennsylvania House of Representatives (1947-1948)

=== Given name ===
- John Upshur Dennis Page (1904–1950), United States Army officer from Saint Paul, Minnesota
- Robert "Bob" Upshur Woodward (born 1943), American investigative journalist and non-fiction author

=== Fictional ===
- Miles Upshur, protagonist of the 2013 survival horror video game Outlast

== Ships ==
- USS Abel P. Upshur (DD-193), Clemson class destroyer in the United States Navy
- USS Upshur (DD-144), Wickes class destroyer in the United States Navy
- USNS Upshur (T-AP-198), Barrett class transport ship of the United States Navy
