= Henry Page =

American politician and jurist (1841–1913)

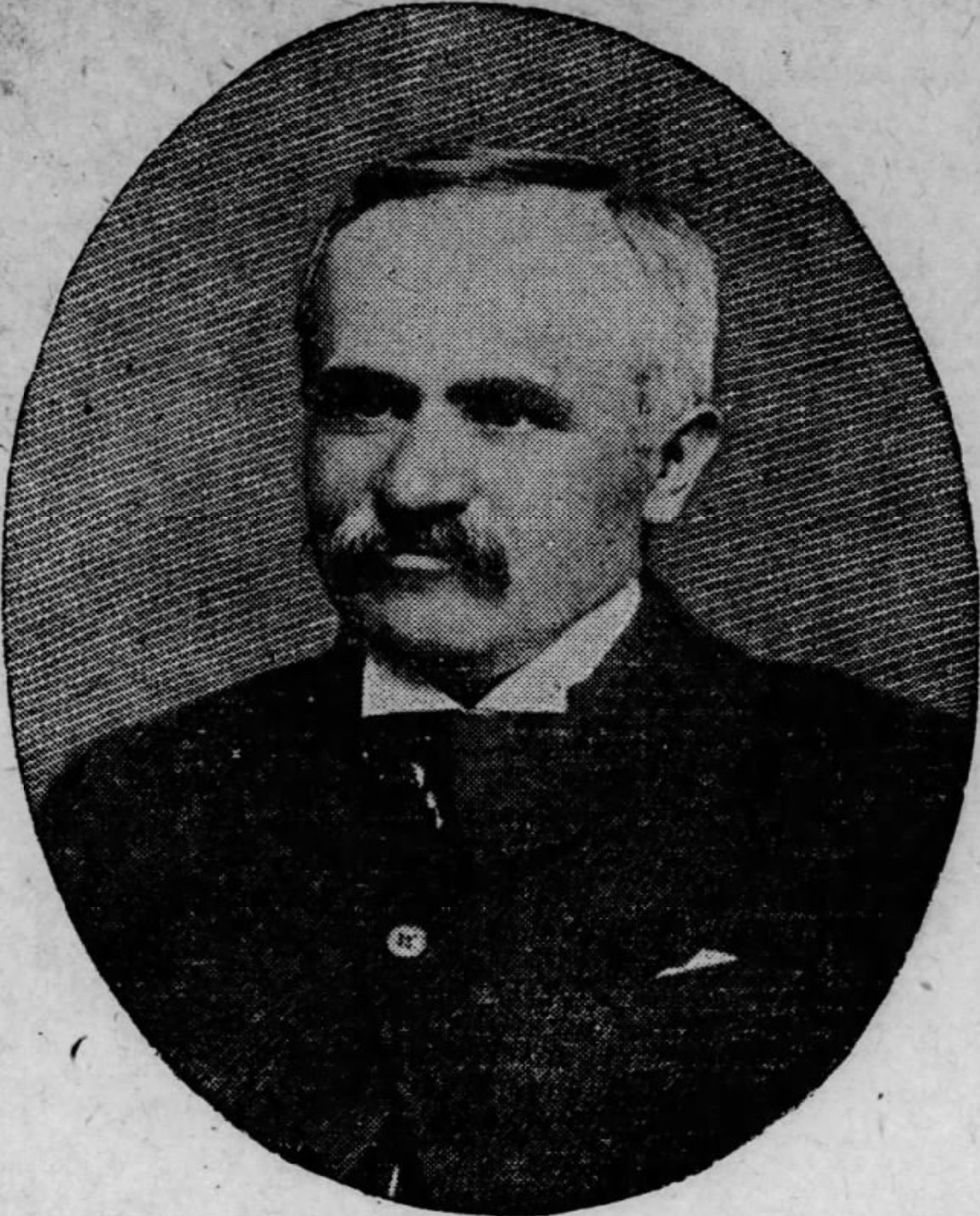
- Page, c. 1901

Member of the U.S. House of Representatives from Maryland's 1st district
- In office March 4, 1891 – September 3, 1892
- Preceded by: Charles H. Gibson
- Succeeded by: John B. Brown

Personal details
- Born: John Woodland Crisfield Jr. June 28, 1841 Princess Anne, Maryland, US
- Died: January 7, 1913 (aged 71) Princess Anne, Maryland, US
- Party: Democratic
- Parent: John W. Crisfield (father)
- Occupation: Politician, judge

Henry Page (born John Woodland Crisfield Jr.; June 28, 1841 – January 7, 1913) was an American politician and jurist. A Democrat, he was a member of the United States House of Representatives from Maryland.

== Biography ==
Page was born John Woodland Crisfield Jr., on June 28, 1841, in Princess Anne, Maryland, the son of politician John W. Crisfield. He was raised by his maternal grandmother, Amy Page, his name being legally changed to Henry Page in 1848. He was educated in West Chester, by one Anthony Bolivar, afterwards studying at the University of Virginia, during which he was a member of Phi Kappa Psi.

During the American Civil War, Page served in the Confederate States Army and was stationed at the Harpers Ferry Armory for about six week. He read law under his father and one William S. Waters, and in 1864, was admitted to the bar, after which he began practicing law in Princess Anne. He was president of the Savings Bank of Somerset County. From 1870 to 1884, he was the attorney of Somerset County.

Page was a Democrat. He was a delegate to the 1867 Maryland Constitutional Convention. He ran for the Maryland General Assembly in 1884, losing by four votes. He was a member of the United States House of Representatives, from March 4, 1891, to September 3, 1892, representing Maryland's 1st district.

Page resigned to become a judge of the Appellate Court of Maryland, being appointed chief justice of its first district court in August of that year. He was elected to the position for a fifteen-year term. He was a Presidential elector in the 1888 election, as which he voted for Grover Cleveland and Allen G. Thurman. Ideologically, he leaned liberal.

Page was Presbyterian and a member of the Knights of Pythias. In October 1867, he married Virginia Upshur Dennis, with whom he had five children. In 1896, he was paralyzed, suffering a paralyzing stroke on December 24, 1912. He died on January 7, 1913, aged 71, in Princess Anne, and was buried at Manokin Presbyterian Church Cemetery.

U.S. House of Representatives
Preceded by Charles H. Gibson	Member of the U.S. House of Representatives from Maryland's 1st congressional district March 4, 1891 – September 3, 1892	Succeeded by John B. Brown
