= Manokin Presbyterian Church =

Historic church in Maryland, US

- U.S. National Register of Historic Places
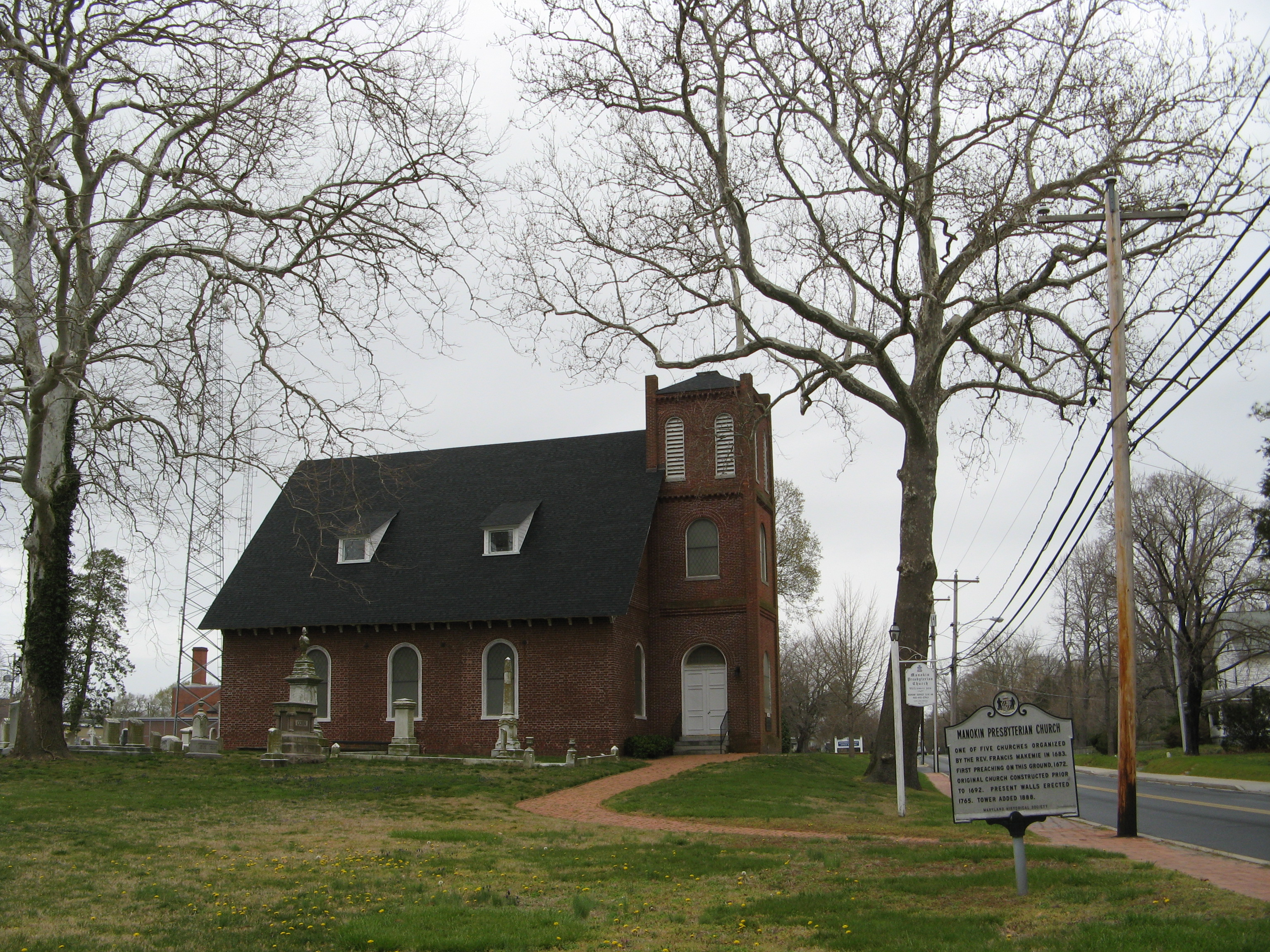
- The church in 2008

- Location within Maryland Location within the United States
- Location: 11890 Somerset Avenue (MD 675), Princess Anne, Maryland
- Coordinates: 38°12′27″N 75°41′43″W
- Area: 2 acres (0.81 ha)
- Built: 1765
- NRHP reference No.: 76001011
- Added to NRHP: November 21, 1976

The Manokin Presbyterian Church is a historic church located in Princess Anne, Somerset County, Maryland. It is a 1 1/2-story brick structure with a three-story entrance tower on the east end. The walls of the main section were built in 1765, and the tower was added in 1888. It is one of the first organized Presbyterian Churches established in America. In 1672, a group of Scotch-Irish Presbyterians who had settled on the Eastern Shore of Maryland, petitioned the Grand Jury of Somerset County for a civil permit to hold services of worship and to have their own minister. The permission was granted, and Robert Maddox was called by the Grand Jury to preach on the third Sunday of each month, at the home of Christopher Nutter, 'at the head of the Manokin River,' the present site. In 1680 a request was sent by Colonel Stevens of Rehobeth to the Presbytery at Laggan, Ireland, for an ordained minister, and three years later, in answer to that request, the Reverend Francis Makemie, a 25-year-old, recently ordained minister, arrived in Somerset County. Under his leadership, this church, and those at Rehobeth, Pitts Creek, Snow Hill, and Wicomico were organized.

It was listed on the National Register of Historic Places in 1976.
