= Justice Spence =

Justice Spence may refer to:

- Ara Spence (1793–1866), associate justice of the Maryland Court of Appeals
- Homer R. Spence (1891–1973), associate justice of the Supreme Court of California
