= William Sydney Wilson =

American politician (1816–1862)

Member of the Provisional Congress of the Confederate States for Mississippi
- In office February 4, 1861 – April 29, 1861
- Preceded by: Office established
- Succeeded by: Jehu Amaziah Orr

Personal details
- Born: November 7, 1816 Snow Hill, Maryland
- Died: November 3, 1862 (aged 45) near Sharpsburg, Maryland

Military service
- Allegiance: Confederate States of America
- Rank: Major
- Unit: 2nd Battalion, Mississippi Infantry
- Battles/wars: American Civil War

William Sydney Wilson (November 7, 1816 – November 3, 1862) was an Mississippi politician, Confederate Congressman, and soldier who died in the American Civil War.

== Biography ==
William Sydney Wilson, the son of Ephraim King Wilson and brother of Ephraim King Wilson II was born in Snow Hill, Maryland, and later moved to Mississippi. Wilson settled in Port Gibson, practiced law, and served as a member of the Mississippi State Legislature from 1858 to 1859 and 1860 to 1861.

A proponent of secession, following Mississippi's withdrawal from the Union in January 1861 Wilson was selected to represent the state in the Provisional Congress of the Confederate States. However, he resigned from Congress shortly after taking office and returned to Mississippi to recruit an infantry company for the war. He was elected as captain of Company F, 2nd Mississippi Infantry Battalion, and was later promoted to major. Wilson took part in battles in Virginia and Maryland as part of the Army of Northern Virginia. He was mortally wounded at the Battle of Antietam on September 17, 1862, and died on November 3.
