= Francis Makemie =

Irish-born evangelist and Presbyterian minister (1658–1708)

The Reverend Francis Makemie
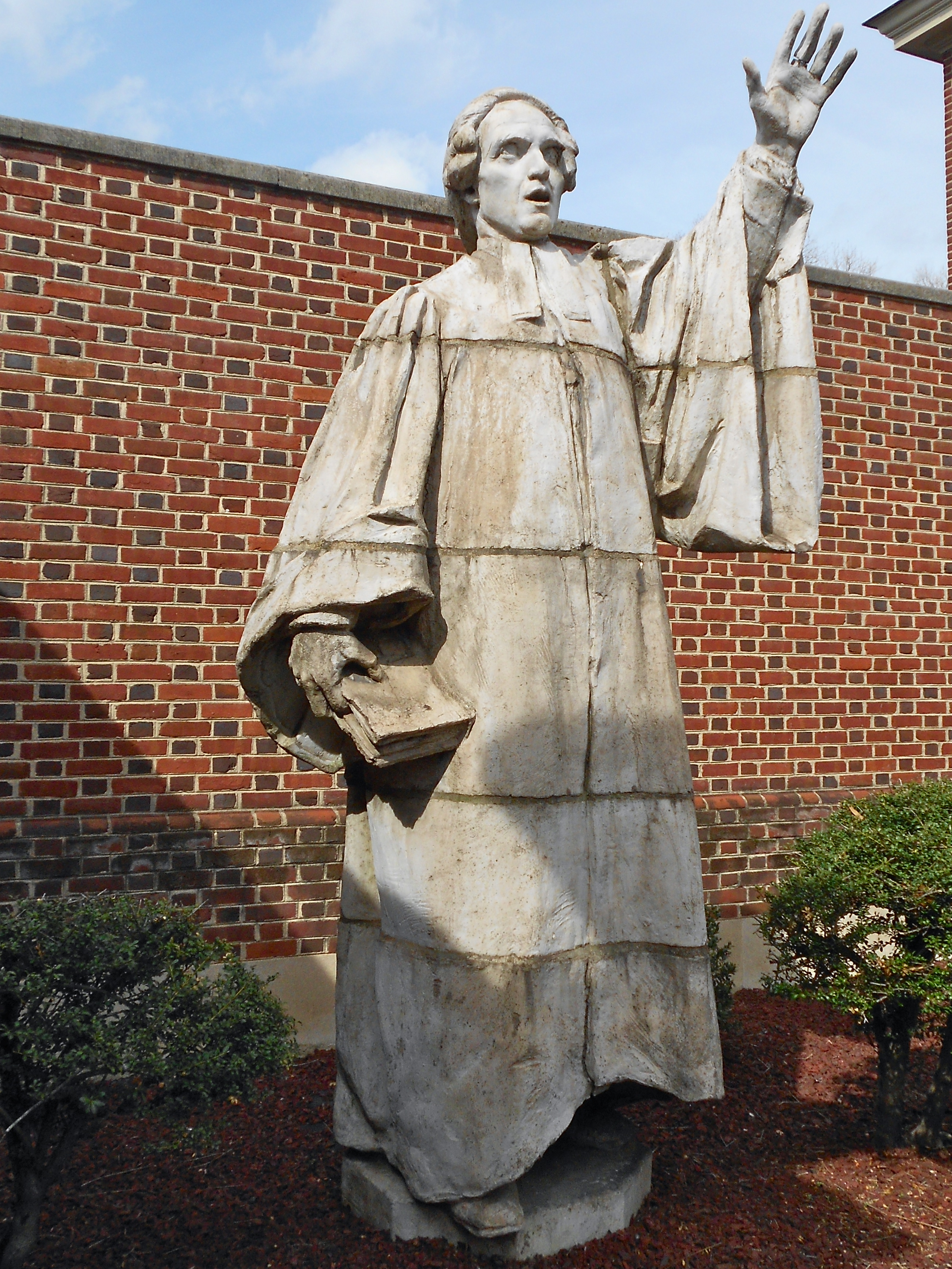
- Statue of Makemie
- Born: c. 1658; Ramelton, Ireland
- Died: August 4, 1708 (aged 49–50); Temperanceville, Colony of Virginia, British America
- Occupations: Presbyterian minister; clergyman
- Known for: Founder of Presbyterianism in the United States
- Spouse: Naomi Anderson
- Children: 2

Ecclesiastical career
- Ordained: 1682

Religious life
- Religion: Christianity
- Denomination: Presbyterian
- Church: Protestant
- Profession: Evangelist

Francis Makemie (c. 1658 – August 4, 1708) was an Irish-born colonial evangelist, Presbyterian minister, and clergyman, who is widely regarded as the founder of Presbyterianism in the United States.

== Early and family life ==
Makemie was born in Ramelton, County Donegal, Ireland part of the province of Ulster. He attended the University of Glasgow, where he experienced a religious conversion and enrolled as "Franciscus Makemus Scoto-Hyburnus". He was ordained a minister by the Presbytery of Laggan in West Ulster in 1681.

== Ministry in America ==
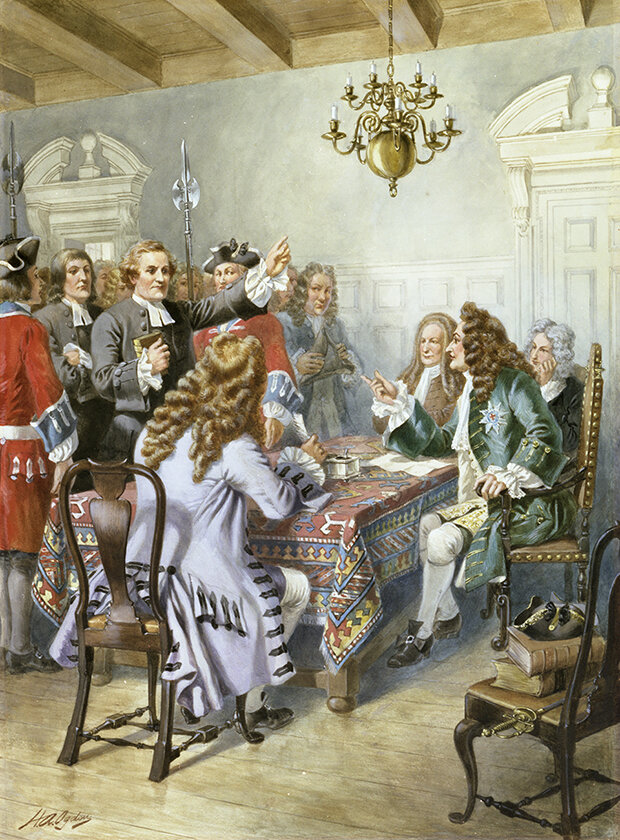
The Rev. Francis Makemie (Standing) before Lord Cornbury on 23 January 1707 for preaching without a license from the British Crown.

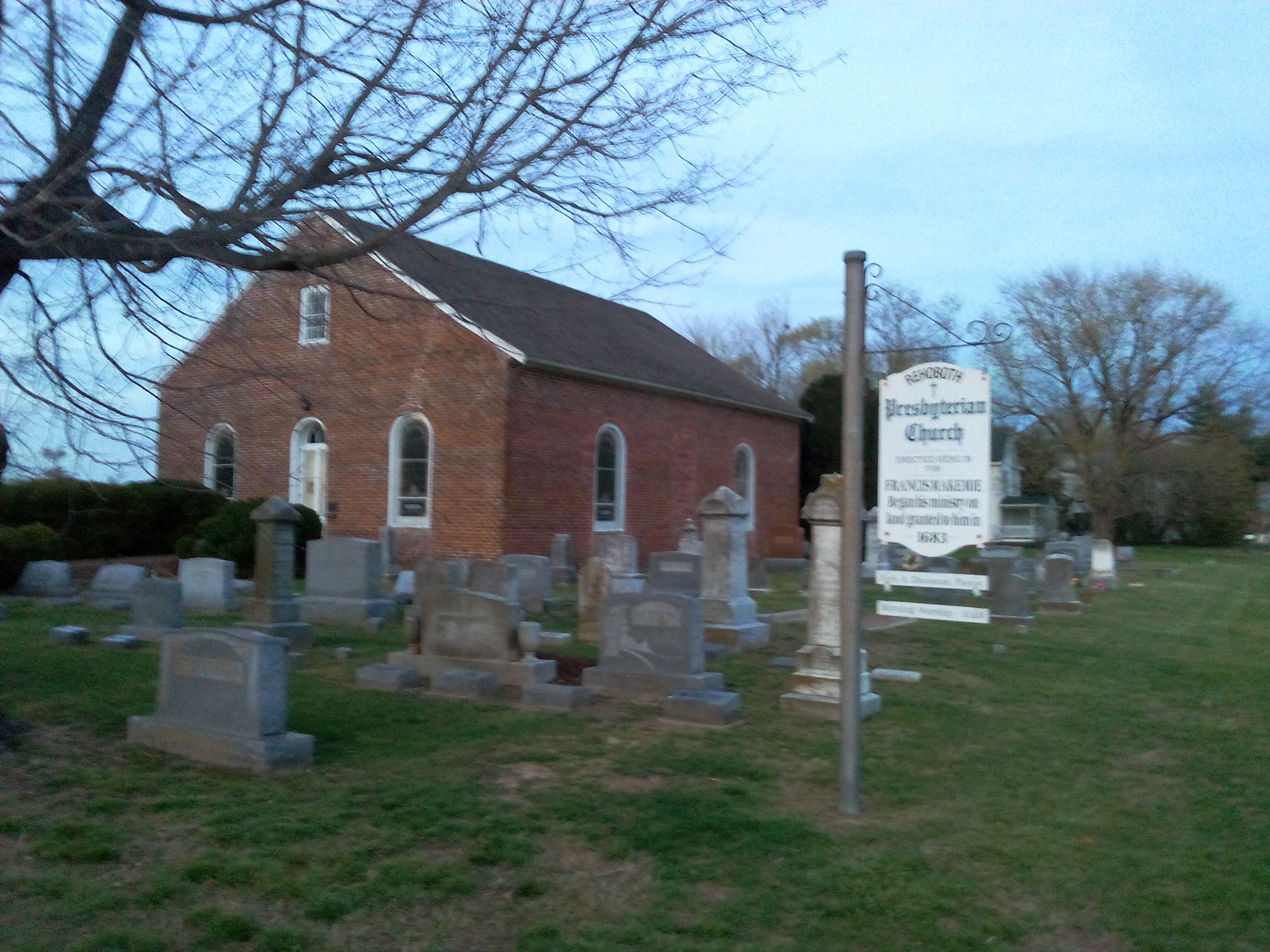
Rehoboth Presbyterian Church

At the request of Colonel William Stevens, an Episcopalian from Rehobeth, Maryland, the Rev. Makemie was sent as a missionary to America, arriving in Maryland in 1683. He initially preached in Somerset County, Maryland, and established the Rehobeth Presbyterian Church, the oldest Presbyterian Church in America, near the Coventry Parish Church which Col. Stevens attended. The ruins of Coventry Parish Church still stand nearby.

Makemie also supported himself as a merchant and travelled among other Scots-Irish communities, many of which were isolated and often suspicious of each other.

In eastern Somerset County (which became Worcester County, Maryland in 1742, where All Hallows Episcopal Church would be erected about a decade later), Makemie founded the first Presbyterian community in the Town of Snow Hill, established in 1686 and named after a London neighborhood. Snow Hill was become the centre of the Presbytery of Snow Hill, which received a charter from Maryland's General Assembly, but was never activated.

Nonetheless, a Presbyterian Church was established early on in Snow Hill. The current Makemie Memorial Presbyterian Church is the fourth building on the site and the congregation's third location in Snow Hill. The first building was situated near the Pocomoke River, the primary means of travel in the 17th and early 18th centuries. Makemie often travelled along the river to visit his congregations at Rehoboth and other distant locations, as well on what later became U.S. Route 13 down the Delmarva Peninsula. This original log building was eventually replaced by a frame structure, located a big further away from the water but still prone to flooding.

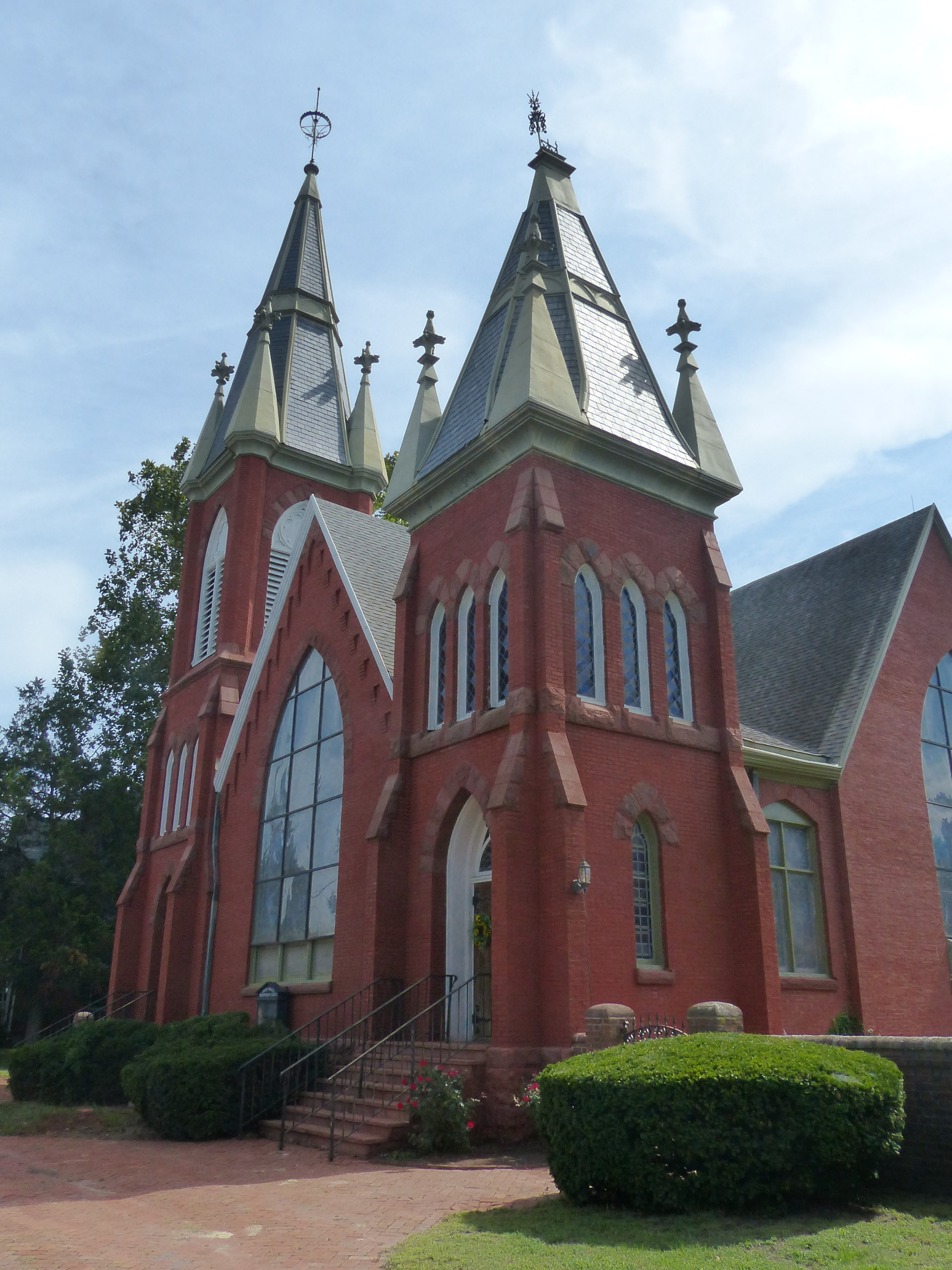
Makemie Memorial Presbyterian Church, Snow Hill, Maryland

Makemie spent the rest of his life travelling widely along the American coast between North Carolina and New York. He was involved in the West Indies Trade. He also helped establish churches in Salisbury, Princess Anne, Berlin and Pocomoke City and two places on the Eastern Shore of Virginia, all in Accomack County further down the Delmarva Peninsula.

In 1691, Makemie published a Catechism which challenged some of the beliefs of the Society of Friends and led to Abolitionist Quaker George Keith publishing a reply. Makemie responded with the 'Answer to George Keith's libel'. The Rev. Increase Mather, a Congregationalist, praised the 'Answer' as the work of "a reverent and judicious minister".

In 1692 he was granted land in Accomack County, Virginia.

While living in Barbados, Makemie wrote 'Truths in a True Light, or a Pastoral Letter to the Reformed Protestants in Barbadoes' on 28 December 1696. The work was published in Edinburgh in 1699, the same year Makemie returned to Accomac. He presented a certificate from Barbados and was allowed to preach in his dwelling in Pocomoke, Maryland, or at designated locations in Accomac, Virginia. He later travelled to London to resolve questions regarding his handling of episcopal duties in his ministry, and brought back two missionaries.

In the late 1690s, he married Naomi Anderson. They had two daughters, Elizabeth and Anne.

In 1705, he brought seven ministers together in Philadelphia and created the Presbytery of Philadelphia; this was the first Presbytery in America.

In 1707, Makemie was arrested by Lord Cornbury, the governor of New York, for preaching without a Crown-issued license, as required under the Toleration Act; he spent two months in jail before his trial. At trial, he produced his preaching license from Barbados, and was acquitted, though he faced heavy legal costs. This case became a landmark victory for religious freedom in America. The controversial Lord Cornbury was recalled to England the following year.

== Publications ==
Makemie's publications included;

- Catechism (1691)
- An answer to George Keith's Libel (1694)
- Truths in a New Light (1699)
- A Plain and Friendly Perswasive to the Inhabitants of Virginia and Maryland for Promoting Towns and Cohabitation (1705)
- A Good Conversation (1707)
- A Narrative of a New and Unusual American Imprisonment, of Two Presbyterian Ministers (1707)

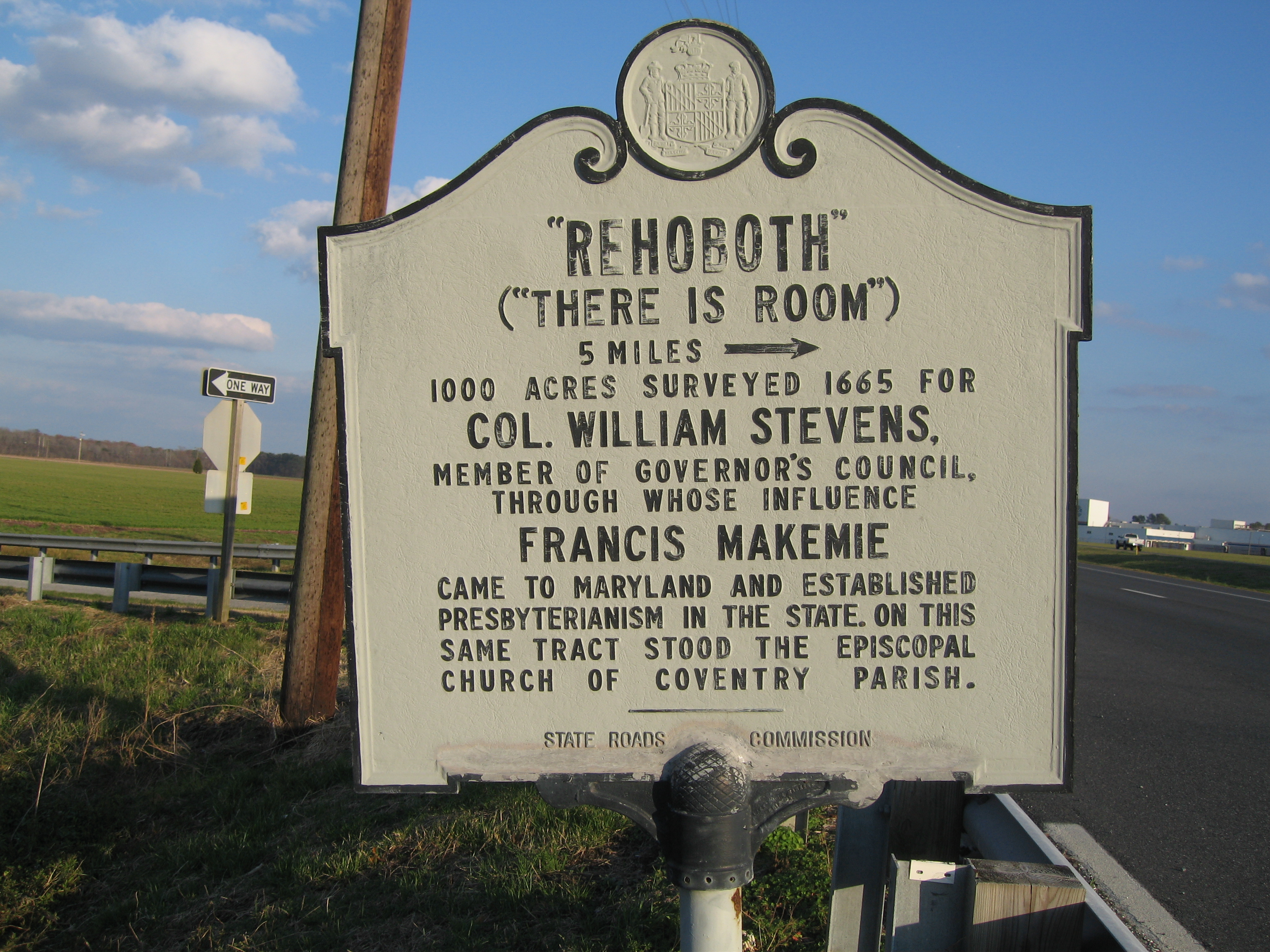
Historical Marker on U.S. Route 13

== Death and legacy ==
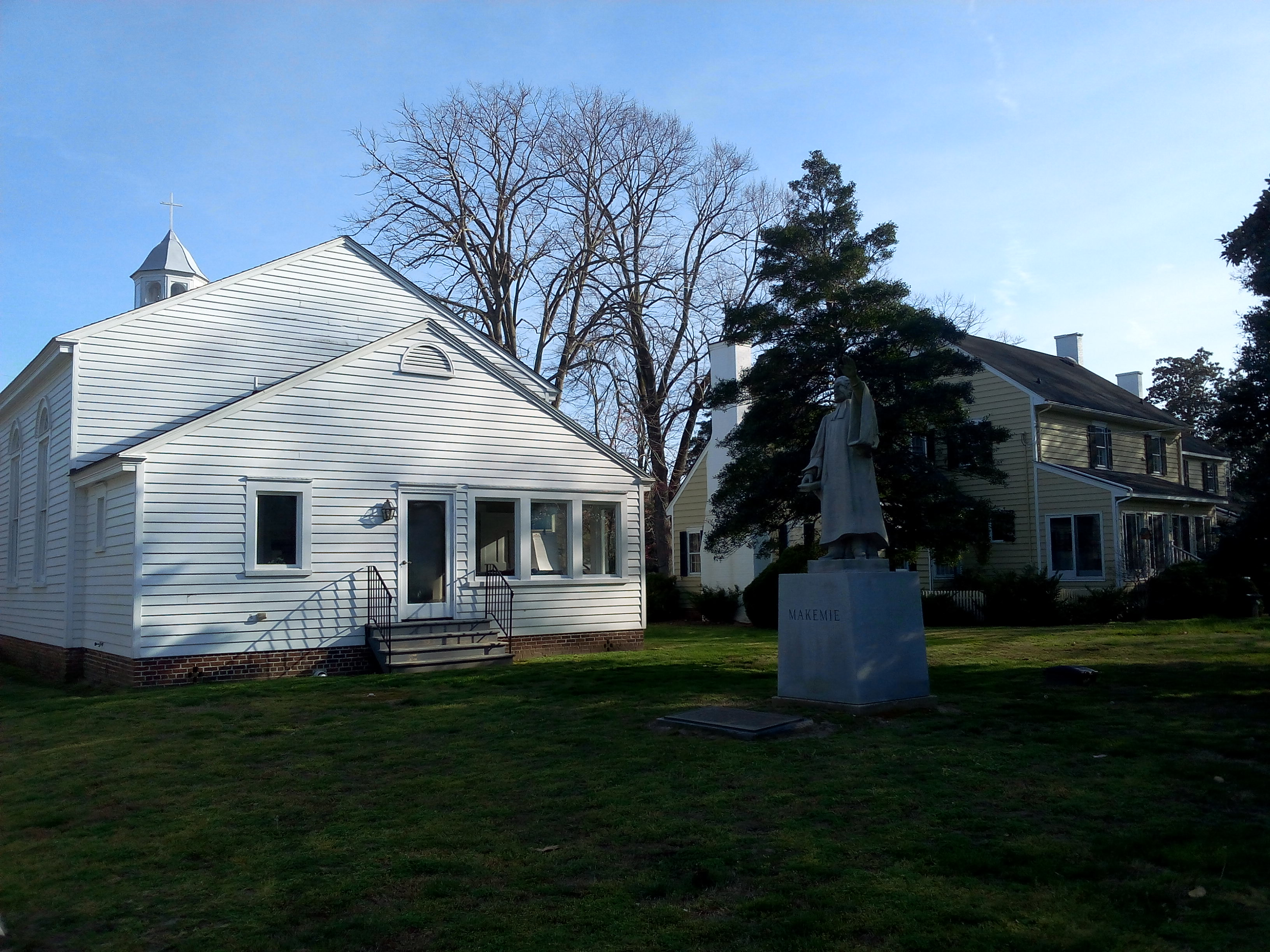
Makemie Statue in Accomac

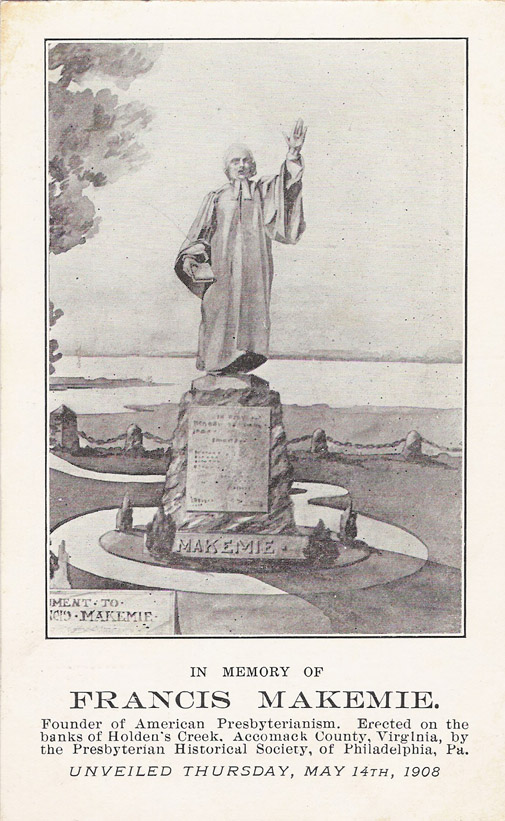
Statue of Makemie on the banks of Holdens Creek in Accomack County, Virginia

Makemie and his wife Naomi purchased a plantation along Holdens Creek in Temperanceville, Virginia in Accomack County, not far from the county seat. There, he spent his final years and died and was buried in an unmarked grave in 1708. In 1908, admirers of his found and purchased the grave site and added a marker in what is now Makemie Monument Park. The community he helped establish still exists today.

Makemie Memorial Presbyterian Church in Snow Hill is named after him as is the town of Makemie Park, Virginia.

Around the 200th anniversary of the Presbyterian Church's founding, outsiders were shocked to find Makemie's gravesite on the former plantation in dilapidated condition. They worked to stabilize it and erected a statue and memorial marker. During this period, the surrounding community was experiencing economic prosperity, leading to the renovation of the church he had founded in Accomac, Virginia (named in his honor). Additionally, they purchased a disused Methodist church in Onancock, Virginia, demolishing it, and built a new structure named after his wife Naomi, in 1903.

Makemie Woods campground, owned and operated by the Presbytery of Eastern Virginia of the Presbyterian Church (USA), is named in honor of Francis Makemie. The camp is located between Williamsburg and Richmond, Virginia.

== See also ==
- List of people on the postage stamps of Ireland
- Presbyterian Church in Ireland
- Presbyterian Church (USA)
- County Donegal
- Ulster
- Ireland
- Republic of Ireland
- Northern Ireland
