= James Augustus Stewart =

American judge (1808–1879)

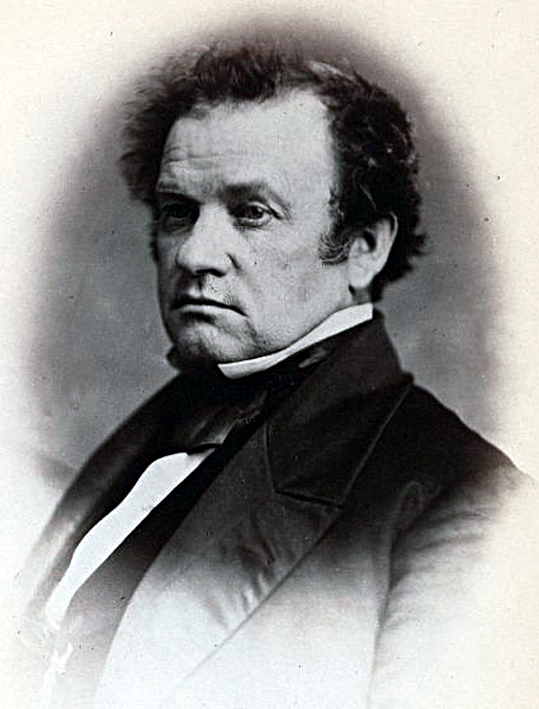

Member of the U.S. House of Representatives from Maryland's 1st district
- In office March 4, 1855 – March 3, 1861
- Preceded by: John Rankin Franklin
- Succeeded by: John W. Crisfield

Member of the Maryland House of Delegates from the Dorchester County district
- In office 1843–1845 Serving with James B. Chaplain, John W. Dail, Joseph Nicols, Francis P. Phelps
- Preceded by: Nathaniel E. Green, William B. Lecompte, Francis P. Phelps, William K. Traverse
- Succeeded by: William Frazier, John R. Keene, Joseph E. Muse, Reuben Tall

Personal details
- Born: November 24, 1808 Dorchester County, Maryland, U.S.
- Died: April 3, 1879 (aged 70) Cambridge, Maryland, U.S.
- Resting place: Christ Protestant Episcopal Church Cemetery
- Party: Democratic
- Spouse: Rebeccca Sophia Eccleston (m. 1837)
- Children: 6
- Education: Franklin College
- Occupation: Politician; lawyer; judge; newspaperman

James Augustus Stewart (November 24, 1808 – April 3, 1879) was an American politician and jurist.

== Early life ==
James Augustus Stewart was born on November 24, 1808, at "Tobacco Stick" (now Madison) in Dorchester County, Maryland, to Joseph Stewart. His father was a shipbuilder in Church Creek. Stewart attended local schools. He attended Franklin College in Baltimore, and studied law under E. I. Finley. He was admitted to the bar in 1829.

== Career ==
Stewart commenced a law practice in Cambridge, Maryland. He also engaged in the building of ships and houses. In 1833, he started a Democratic paper, the Cambridge Aurora. From 1840 to 1841, he was director of the Easton branch of Farmer's Bank of Maryland.

Stewart was an unsuccessful candidate for election in 1838 to the Twenty-sixth Congress, and served as a member of the Maryland House of Delegates, representing Dorchester County, from 1843 to 1845. He was a member of the Ways and Means committee. He was a delegate to the 1844 Democratic National Convention and the 1856 Democratic National Convention. He was elected as a Democrat to the Thirty-fourth, Thirty-fifth, and Thirty-sixth Congresses, serving from March 4, 1855, to March 3, 1861. During the Thirty-fifth Congress, Stewart served as chairman of the Committee on Patents.

Stewart was not a candidate for renomination to Congress in 1860, and resumed his law practice and farming in Cambridge. In 1855, he was appointed to replace Ara Spence. He became a judge of the Maryland Court of Appeals and served as chief justice of the circuit court from 1867 to his death. In 1878, his eligibility was extended to January 1, 1883, so he could serve as judge beyond the age of 70.

Stewart was a large land owner in Dorchester County and various shipping vessels.

== Personal life ==
Stewart married Rebecca Sophia Eccleston on January 31, 1837. They had six children, including Donald, Alfred and Billy.

Stewart died from "cancer in the face" on April 3, 1879, at his home in Cambridge. He is interred in Christ Protestant Episcopal Church Cemetery.

U.S. House of Representatives
Preceded by John Rankin Franklin	Member of the U.S. House of Representatives from Maryland's 1st congressional district March 4, 1855 – March 3, 1861	Succeeded by John Woodland Crisfield
