= George Upshur =

George Upshur may refer to:

- George P. Upshur (1799–1852), United States Navy officer
- George M. Upshur (1847–1924), American politician and lawyer
