= Franklin Upshur =

American politician and lawyer (1875–1965)

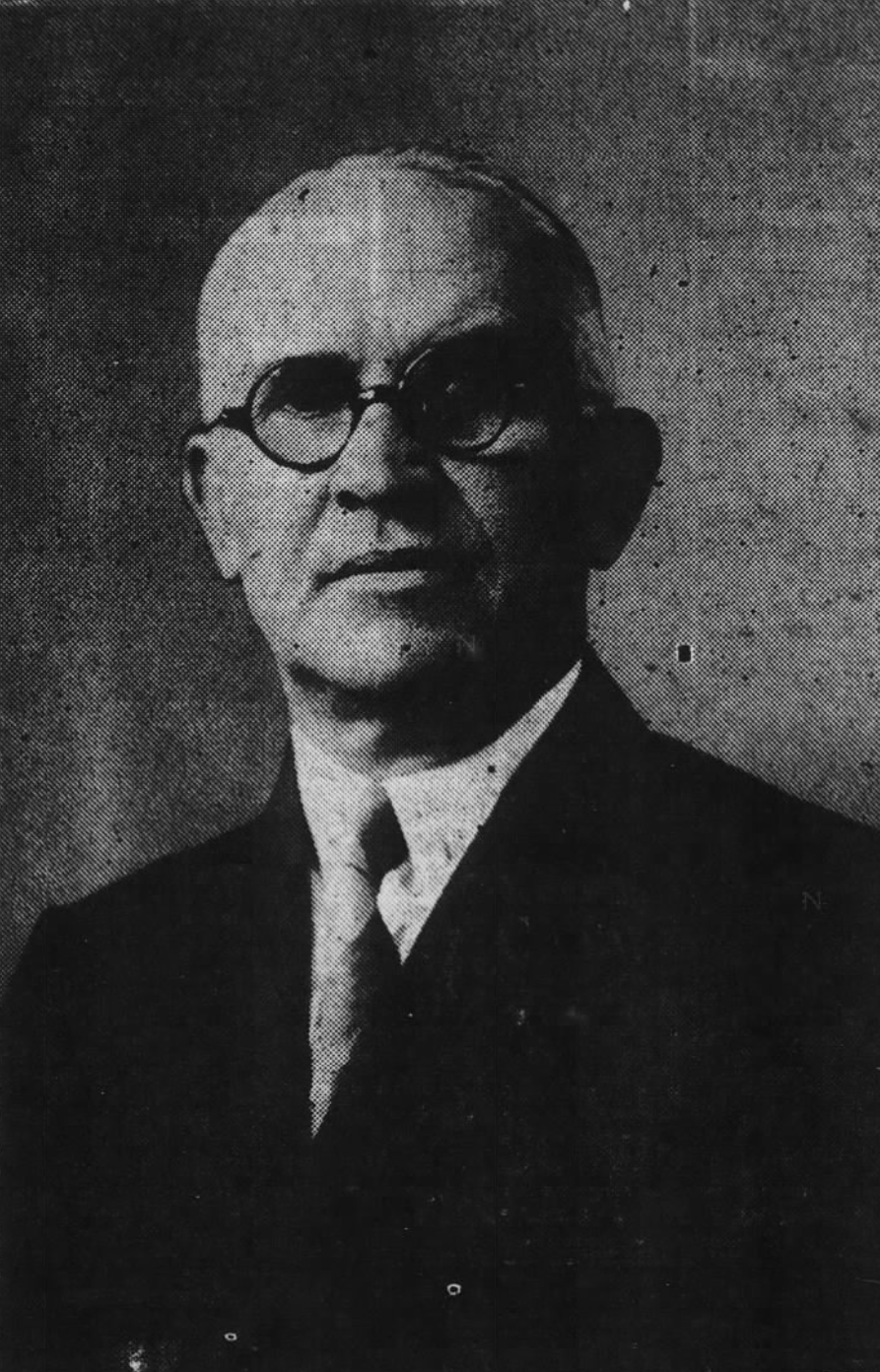
- Upshur in 1926 newspaper

Member of the Maryland House of Delegates
- In office 1924

Personal details
- Born: November 27, 1875 Snow Hill, Maryland, U.S.
- Died: August 16, 1965 (aged 89) Salisbury, Maryland, U.S.
- Resting place: Makemie Memorial Presbyterian Church; Snow Hill, Maryland, U.S.
- Party: Democratic
- Spouse: Ethelyn Wilson (m. 1909; died 1957)
- Relations: John Rankin Franklin (grandfather)
- Children: 1
- Parent: George M. Upshur (father)
- Education: Princeton University; University of Maryland School of Law
- Occupation: Politician; lawyer

Franklin Upshur (November 27, 1875 – August 16, 1965) was an American politician and lawyer. He served in the Maryland House of Delegates in 1924 and as state's attorney of Worcester County, Maryland from 1947 to 1951.

== Early life ==
Franklin Upshur was born on November 27, 1875, in Snow Hill, Maryland to Emma (née Franklin) and George M. Upshur. His grandfather was John Rankin Franklin. He graduated from Princeton University in 1897 and he graduated from the University of Maryland School of Law in 1899.

== Career ==
Around 1900, Upshur became an assistant state's attorney in Baltimore. By 1909, he was practicing law with his father in Snow Hill under the law firm Upshur and Upshur.

Upshur was a Democrat. Upshur served in the Maryland House of Delegates in 1924. In 1933, Upshur worked for the Worcester County Public Schools. In 1926, Upshur ran against Thomas Alan Goldsborough for a seat in the United States House of Representatives. He ran to modify or repeal the Volstead Act and advocated for a tariff on tomatoes. Goldsborough defeated Upshur in the Democratic primary.

Upshur served as state's attorney in Worcester County, Maryland from 1947 to 1951.

== Personal life ==
Upshur married Ethelyn Wilson, daughter of Ephraim King Wilson II, of Baltimore on June 23, 1909. She died in 1957. He had one daughter, Ann.

Upshur died on August 16, 1965, at Spring Hill Sanitarium in Salisbury, Maryland. He was buried at Makemie Memorial Presbyterian Church in Snow Hill.
