= Littleton Dennis Jr. =

American judge (1765–1833)

Littleton Dennis Jr. (1765–1833) was a justice of the Maryland Court of Appeals from 1801 to 1806.

Born in Worcester County, Maryland, to Littleton Dennis and Susan (Upshur) Dennis, Dennis inherited Essex Farm in Rehobeth, Somerset County, Maryland, from his father in 1884, and over the next fourteen years had a large frame dwelling constructed there. Dennis was appointed to the state court of appeals, then the highest court in the state, on October 22, 1801, after William Cooke of Baltimore County declined the appointment. Dennis was appointed from Somerset County, along with Richard Potts of Frederick County. While other judges were appointed around the same time, only Dennis and Potts took oaths of office, on November 3, 1801. In 1806, the state courts were restructured so that district court judges would also constitute the court of appeals.

Dennis married a cousin, Elizabeth Upsher, with whom he had several children, and died at Essex Farm around the age of 68. The house was later listed on the National Register of Historic Places under the name Caldicott (the original name of the tract of land).

Political offices
Preceded by Newly established court	Judge of the Maryland Court of Appeals; 1801–1806	Succeeded by Court restructured
