= John Rankin Franklin =

American politician (1820–1878)

Member of the U.S. House of Representatives from Maryland's 1st district
- In office March 4, 1853 – March 3, 1855
- Preceded by: Richard Bowie
- Succeeded by: James A. Stewart

Speaker of the Maryland House of Delegates
- In office 1849
- Preceded by: William J. Blakistone
- Succeeded by: Elias Ware

Member of the Maryland House of Delegates
- In office 1843
- In office 1849

Personal details
- Born: May 6, 1820 Worcester County, Maryland, U.S.
- Died: January 11, 1878 (aged 57) Snow Hill, Maryland, U.S.
- Resting place: Makemie Memorial Presbyterian Church; Snow Hill, Maryland, U.S.
- Party: Whig
- Relations: Franklin Upshur (grandson)

John Rankin Franklin (May 6, 1820 – January 11, 1878) was a Congressional Representative for the U.S. state of Maryland. He also served as a member of the Maryland House of Delegates in 1843 and as Speaker of the Maryland House of Delegates in 1849.

== Early life ==
John Rankin Franklin was born in Worcester County, Maryland, and graduated from Jefferson College in 1836. He then studied law and was admitted to the bar in 1841.

== Career ==
Franklin opened a law practice in Snow Hill, Maryland. He was a member of the Maryland House of Delegates, representing Worcester County, in 1843, and served as president of the Maryland State Board of Public Works in 1851. He was elected as a Whig to the Thirty-third Congress, and served the 1st Congressional district of Maryland from March 4, 1853, until March 3, 1855. He again became a member of the Maryland House of Delegates and served as the Speaker of the Maryland House of Delegates in 1849. Franklin was a judge of the first judicial circuit of Maryland from 1867 until his death.

== Personal life ==
His daughter Sarah E. married George M. Upshur. Her son Franklin Upshur was an assistant state's attorney.

Franklin died on January 11, 1878, in Snow Hill. He is buried in the churchyard of Makemie Memorial Presbyterian Church in Snow Hill.

Political offices
Preceded by William J. Blakistone	Speaker of the Maryland House of Delegates; 1849	Succeeded by Elias Ware
U.S. House of Representatives
Preceded by Richard Bowie	Member of the U.S. House of Representatives from Maryland's 1st congressional district 1853–1855	Succeeded by James Augustus Stewart
