= John P. Moore (Maryland politician) =

American politician (1856–1918)

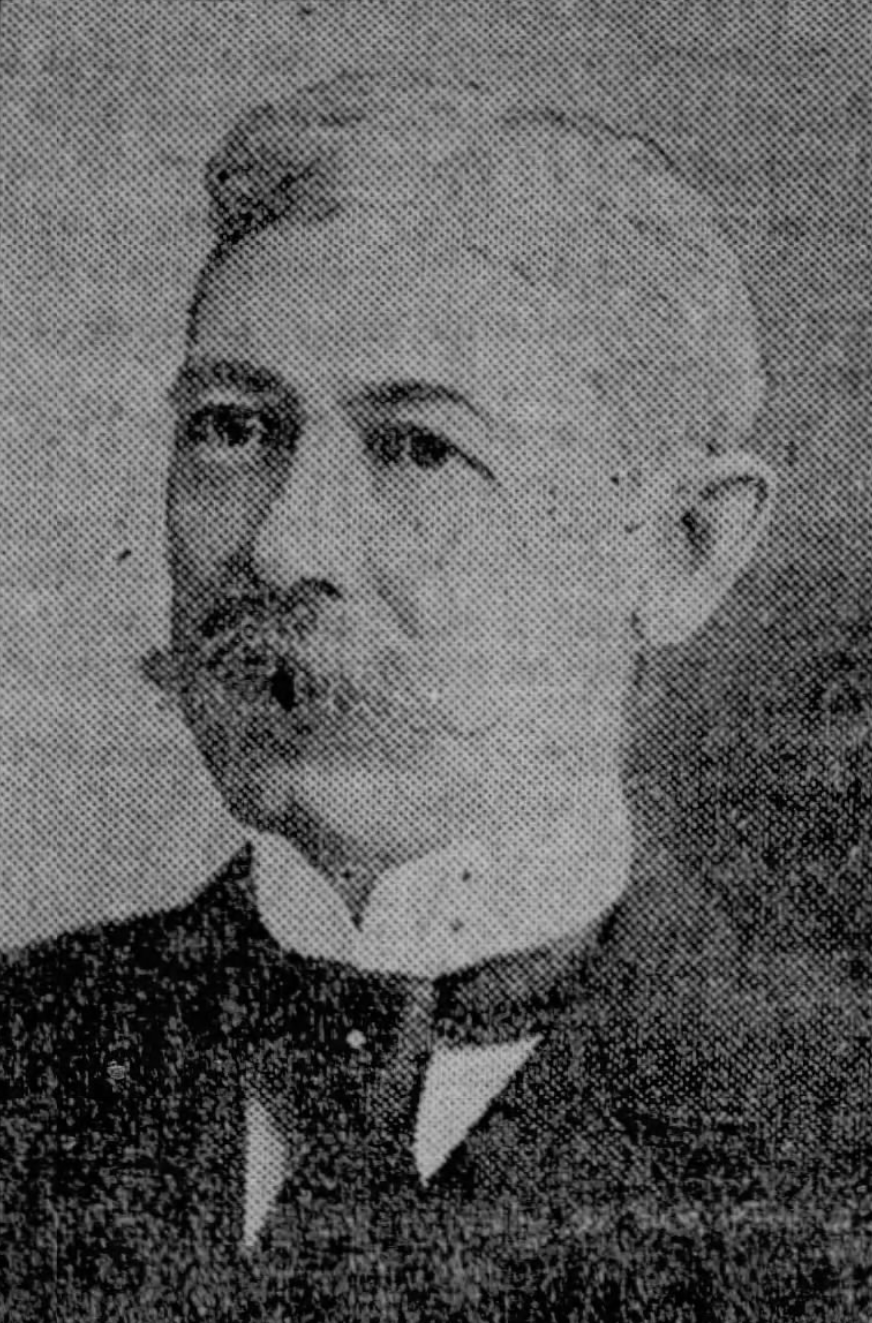
- Moore in 1906 newspaper

Member of the Maryland Senate from the Worcester County district
- In office 1900–1914
- Preceded by: John Walter Smith
- Succeeded by: Orlando Harrison

Personal details
- Born: December 12, 1856 Snow Hill, Maryland, U.S.
- Died: October 1, 1918 (aged 61) Snow Hill, Maryland, U.S.
- Resting place: Makemie Memorial Presbyterian Church; Snow Hill, Maryland, U.S.
- Party: Democratic
- Children: 3
- Education: Delaware College
- Occupation: Politician; businessman

John P. Moore (December 12, 1856 – October 1, 1918) was an American politician from Maryland. He served as a member of the Maryland Senate from 1900 to 1914. He served as mayor of Snow Hill.

== Early life ==
John P. Moore was born on December 12, 1856, in Snow Hill, Maryland, to Margaret Gordon (née Toadvine) and John R. P. Moore. He graduated from Snow Hill Academy and Delaware College (later University of Delaware).

== Career ==
Moore was a member of the mill and lumber business Richardson, Moore & Smith. He later became a partner. Moore was also associated with Smith, Moore & Co. with state senator John Walter Smith. He also served as president of the Snow Hill Electric Light Company, director of the First National Bank of Snow Hill, stockholder of the Snow Hill Coal and Ice Company and a member of the firm R. F. Ayers & Co. He served as director of the Surry Lumber Company of Virginia and as president of the Neuse River Lumber Company of North Carolina.

Moore was a Democrat. He was elected to the Maryland Senate in 1899, serving out the unexpired term of John Walter Smith. He served in that body until 1914. He served as president pro tempore of the Maryland Senate during sessions 1906, 1908 and 1912. He served as chairman of the Democratic State Central Committee of Worcester County for several years. In 1900, Moore was a candidate for the U.S. House of Representatives, but was defeated by William Humphreys Jackson. He also served as the mayor of Snow Hill for several terms.

== Personal life ==
Moore married and had three children, Mrs. Samuel K Dennis, Mrs. William R. Bishop and John P. Jr. He was a member of the Protestant Episcopal Church.

Moore died on October 1, 1918, at his home in Snow Hill. He was buried at Makemie Memorial Presbyterian Church graveyard in Snow Hill.
