= Caldicott =

Historic house in Maryland, United States

- U.S. National Register of Historic Places
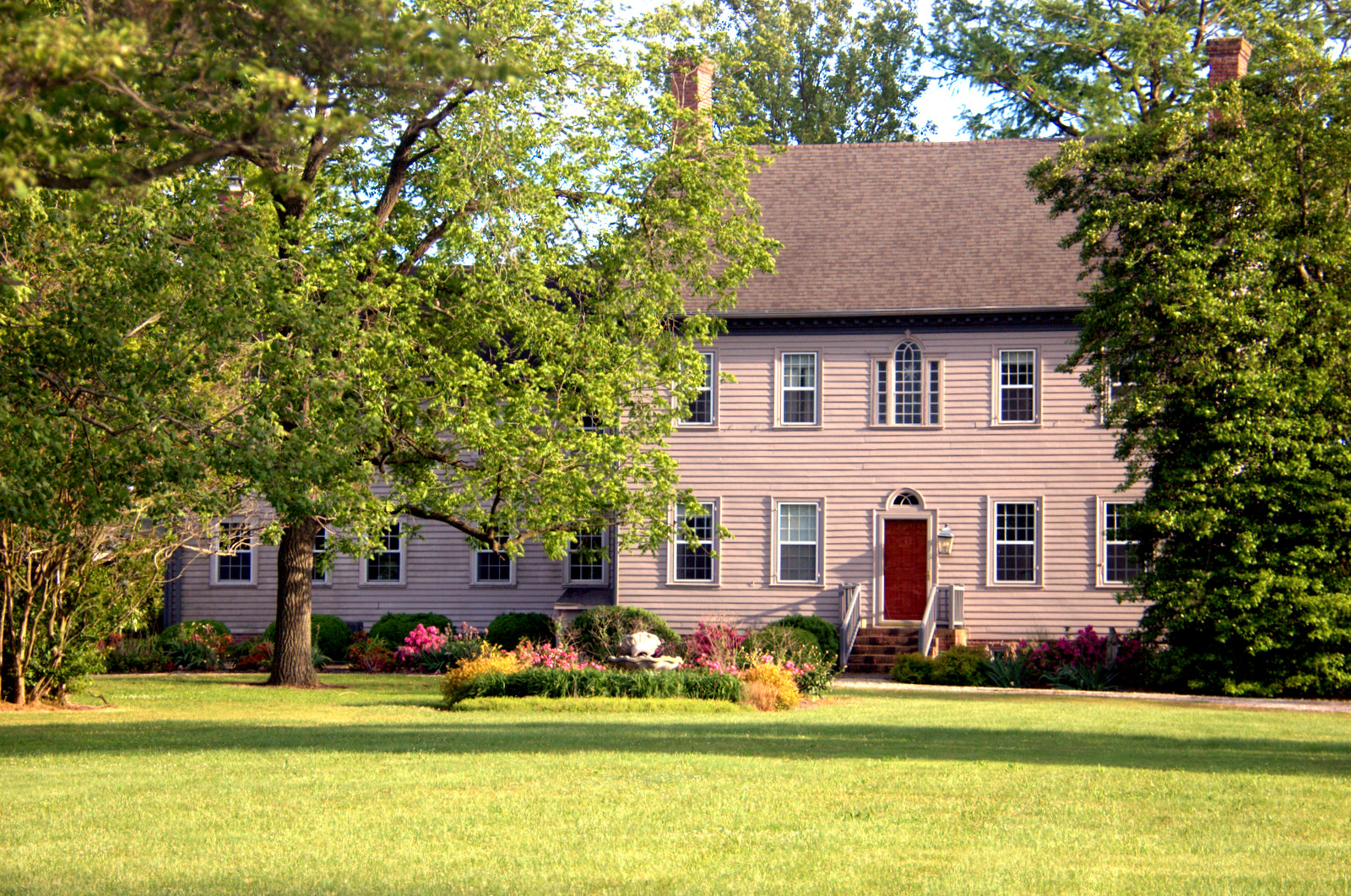

- Location within Maryland Location within the United States
- Location: Old Rehobeth Road (MD 667), Rehobeth, Maryland
- Coordinates: 38°3′13″N 75°39′2″W
- Area: 12.3 acres (5.0 ha)
- Built: 1784
- Built by: Littleton Dennis Jr.
- Architectural style: Federal
- NRHP reference No.: 83003796
- Added to NRHP: December 22, 1983

Caldicott, also known as Vessey House and Essex Farm, is a historic home located at Rehobeth, Somerset County, Maryland, United States. It is a large frame dwelling constructed between 1784 and 1798 by Littleton Dennis Jr. The house stands two stories above a raised basement of Flemish bond brick. Also on the property are a gambrel-roofed barn, sheds and storage buildings, and a water tower.

Caldicott was listed on the National Register of Historic Places in 1983.
