= Robert N. Martin =

American judge

Robert Nicols Martin

Member of the U.S. House of Representatives from Maryland's 8th district
- In office March 4, 1825 – March 4, 1827
- Preceded by: John S. Spence
- Succeeded by: Ephraim King Wilson

Judge of the Maryland Court of Appeals
- In office 1845–1851

Judge of the Superior Court of Baltimore
- In office 1859–1867

Personal details
- Born: January 14, 1798 Cambridge, Maryland
- Died: July 20, 1870 (aged 72) Saratoga Springs, New York
- Party: National Republican Party
- Occupation: Politician, Judge, Professor

Robert Nicols Martin (January 14, 1798 – July 20, 1870) was an American politician from Maryland.

Martin was born in Cambridge, Maryland, where he attended the public schools. He studied law, was admitted to the bar, and practised at Princess Anne from 1819 to 1827. He was elected to the Nineteenth Congress, where he served from March 4, 1825 to March 3, 1827.

After his term, Martin settled in Baltimore and resumed the practice of law. He was appointed by Governor Thomas Pratt as judge of the Maryland Court of Appeals and as chief justice of the western judicial district in 1845, in which capacity he served until the office was vacated by the Maryland Constitution of 1851. He again engaged in the practice of his profession in Baltimore. He later served as judge of the superior court of Baltimore from 1859 to 1867, and as professor of international law at the University of Maryland, Baltimore from 1867 to 1870. He died at Saratoga Springs, New York, and is interred in the Christ Protestant Episcopal Church Cemetery in Cambridge.

U.S. House of Representatives
| Preceded by John S. Spence | Member of the U.S. House of Representatives from Maryland's 8th congressional district March 4, 1825 – March 3, 1827 | Succeeded by Ephraim King Wilson |
