= John W. Crisfield =

American politician (1806–1897)

Coordinates: 38°12′27.2″N 75°41′41.7″W

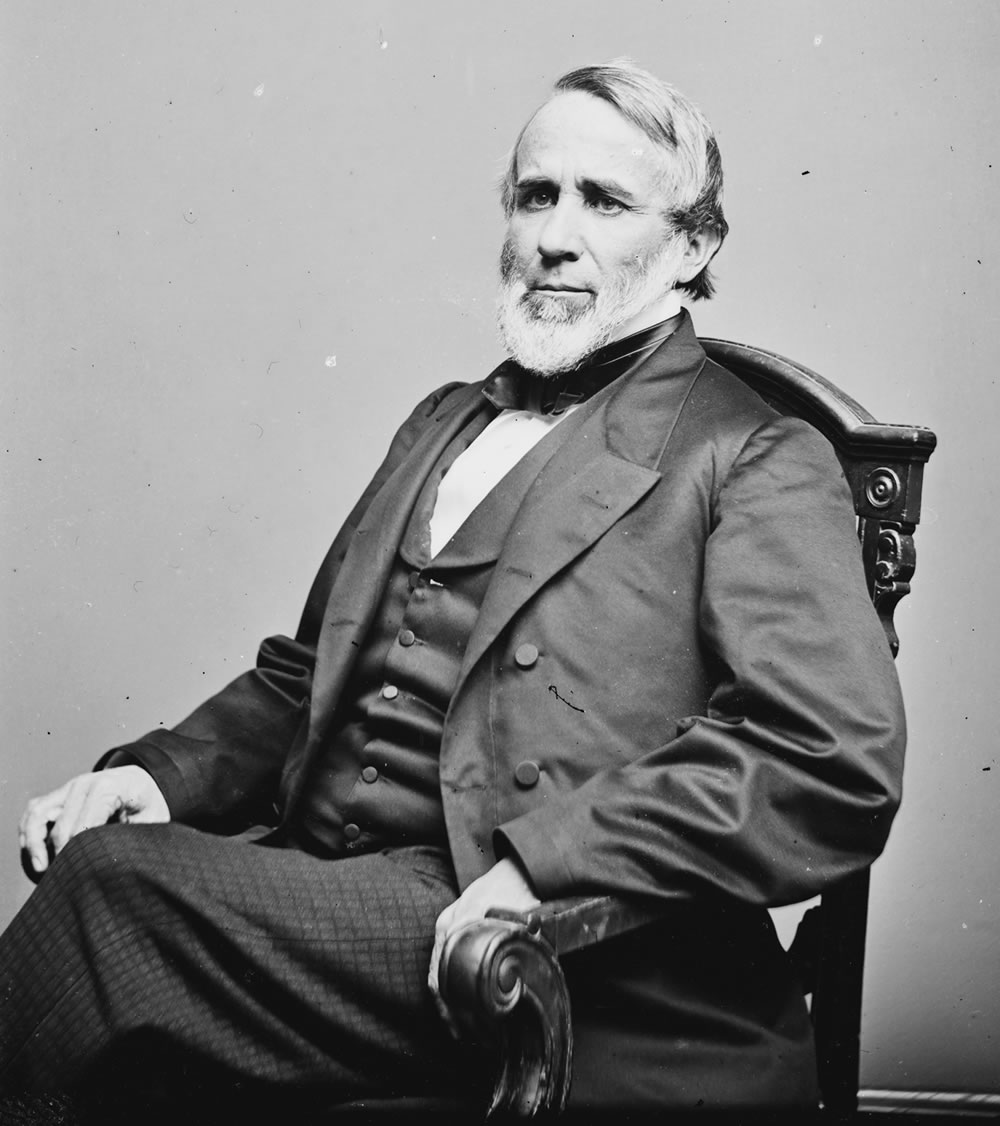
- John W. Crisfield

Member of the U.S. House of Representatives from Maryland's 6th district
- In office March 4, 1847 – March 3, 1849
- Preceded by: Edward H. C. Long
- Succeeded by: John B. Kerr

Member of the U.S. House of Representatives from Maryland's 1st district
- In office March 4, 1861 – March 3, 1863
- Preceded by: James A. Stewart
- Succeeded by: John A. J. Creswell

Personal details
- Born: November 8, 1806 Kent County, Maryland, U.S.
- Died: January 12, 1897 Princess Anne, Maryland, U.S.
- Party: Whig, Union
- Spouse(s): Ellen R. Johnson, Julia Ethelaide Page, Mary W. Handy
- Children: Henry Page and 6 others
- Education: Washington College
- Occupation: Lawyer

John Woodland Crisfield (November 8, 1806 – January 12, 1897) was a U.S. representative from Maryland, representing the sixth district from 1847 to 1849 and the first district from 1861 to 1863. The city of Crisfield, Maryland, is named after him. Crisfield was a strong supporter of the Union during American Civil War, opposing moves towards Maryland's secession. However, Crisfield also supported the institution of slavery and worked to prevent its abolition in Maryland.

== Early life ==
Crisfield was born near Galena, Maryland, in Kent County on the Eastern Shore of Maryland. His father, Arthur, died when he was 16 years old. He was educated at Washington College in Chestertown, Maryland. He studied law, worked at the law firm of his cousin and brother-in-law Henry Page and was admitted to the bar in 1830, commencing practice in Indiana. Shortly after going to Indiana he was called back to Maryland and decided to remain. In 1832 he opened his own law office in Princess Anne.

== Career in politics ==
Crisfield entered the Maryland House of Delegates in 1836 and was an ardent Whig and supported Clay and Webster in their runs for the Presidency. In 1840, he was the editor and owner of the Somerset Herald, which supported William Henry Harrison for president.

He was elected to the Thirtieth Congress, defeating Samuel D. Lecompte, and serving the 6th Congressional district of Maryland from March 4, 1847 until March 3, 1849. While in Congress, he opposed the Mexican-American War and supported the spread of slavery into the territories. He chose not to run for re-election in 1849.

He was a delegate to the State constitutional convention in 1850-1851, where he unsuccessfully opposed the election of judges.

When the Whig party dissolved, Crisfield chose not to join the American Party. He ran for the judgeship of the Queen Anne district, but lost by 64 votes to a candidate of the American Party. After that, he voted with the Democrats, but never affiliated with it.

He was a member of the peace conference of 1861 held in Washington, D.C., in an effort to devise means to prevent the impending American Civil War.

== Congress, war and the question of slavery ==
In 1861, Crisfield was elected as a Unionist to the Thirty-seventh Congress from the 1st Congressional district of Maryland, serving one term from March 4, 1861, until March 3, 1863. He saw secession as revolution and did all he could do avoid the breakup of the Union.

Although Maryland remained loyal to the Union at the outbreak of the American Civil War, Maryland was divided on the question of slavery and the emancipation of Maryland slaves remained by no means a foregone conclusion. On December 16, 1861, a bill was presented to Congress to emancipate slaves in Washington, D.C., and in March 1862 Lincoln held talks with Crisfield on the subject of emancipation. Crisfield however argued that freedom would be worse for the slaves than slavery, especially in time of war, but such arguments could no longer hold back the abolitionist tide.

Crisfield also opposed making greenbacks official currency and felt vindicated when they were struck down by the Supreme Court, even if the ruling didn't hold for long.

In 1863 Crisfield was defeated in local elections by the abolitionist candidate John Creswell, amid allegations of vote-rigging by the army.

After being defeated at the polls, Crisfield resumed the practice of law.

== After the War ==
Crisfield served as a delegate to the National Union Convention in Philadelphia, Pennsylvania, in 1866 but focused mainly on his career as a lawyer dealing with land ownership, riparian rights and civil rights cases.

During this time he was a leader of efforts to deny recently freed slaves the right to vote and to oppose any special favors on their part.

He was instrumental in building the Eastern Shore Railroad and served as its president. The railroad connected the fishing town of Somers Cove/Governors Point which was growing rapidly due to the seafood industry there to the Delaware Railroad. He founded Crisfield in this location, which was named for him in his honor.

He was married three times. He was first married to Ellen R. Johnson, then to his cousin, Julia Ethelaide Page - by whom he was father to future congressman Henry Page - and finally to Mary W. Handy

A rural road in Princess Anne, called Crisfield Lane and passing next to his homeplace, 'Edge Hill', is also named after him. He died at Edge Hill in Princess Anne in 1897, and is interred in Manokin Presbyterian Cemetery.

== Notes ==
U.S. House of Representatives
Preceded by Edward Henry Carroll Long	Member of the U.S. House of Representatives from Maryland's 6th congressional district 1847–1849	Succeeded by John Bozman Kerr
Preceded by James Augustus Stewart	Member of the U.S. House of Representatives from Maryland's 1st congressional district 1861–1863	Succeeded by John Creswell
