= George L. Wellington =

American politician (1852–1927)

George Louis Wellington
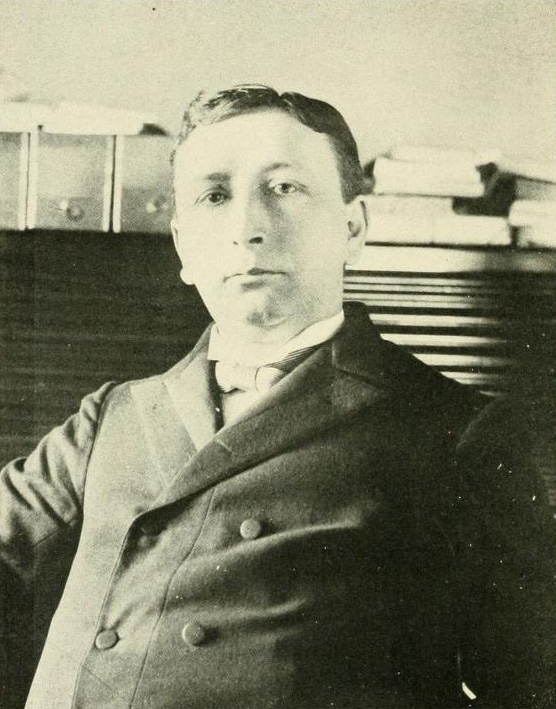

United States Senator from Maryland
- In office March 4, 1897 – March 4, 1903
- Preceded by: Charles H. Gibson
- Succeeded by: Arthur P. Gorman

Member of the U.S. House of Representatives from Maryland's 6th district
- In office March 4, 1895 – March 3, 1897
- Preceded by: William M. McKaig
- Succeeded by: John McDonald

Personal details
- Born: January 28, 1852 Cumberland, Maryland
- Died: March 20, 1927 (aged 75) Cumberland, Maryland
- Party: Republican (until 1900); Progressive (1912–13)

George Louis Wellington (January 28, 1852 – March 20, 1927) was a Republican member of the United States Senate, representing the State of Maryland from 1897 to 1903. He also represented the sixth district of Maryland in the U.S. House of Representatives.

Born in Cumberland, Maryland, to a father and mother from Hesse and Bavaria, respectively, Wellington attended a German school with some private instruction. He went on to be a clerk in the Second National Bank of Cumberland in 1870 and later was a teller.

From 1882 to 1888 and 1890, Wellington was treasurer of Allegany County, Maryland. He unsuccessfully ran for Comptroller of Maryland in 1889, but was chosen as the assistant treasurer of the United States at Baltimore, Maryland, from 1890 to 1893.

Wellington was unsuccessful in his campaign to be elected to the 53rd Congress in 1892, but two years later, in 1894, was elected as a Republican to the 54th Congress. After serving one term, he was elected to the United States Senate in 1896, serving one term from 1897 to 1903, choosing not to run for re-election in 1902. As senator, he was chairman of the U.S. Senate Committee to Establish a University of the United States (55th and 56th Congresses).

On September 4, 1900, Wellington formally withdrew from the Republican Party and supported Democratic presidential candidate William Jennings Bryan (who was running against Pres. William McKinley for the second consecutive time). The September 5, 1900, edition of The New York Times described it thus:

CUMBERLAND, Maryland, Sept 4.—In a Speech delivered here to-night, in the presence of William J. Bryan, who afterward spoke from the same platform. United States Senator George L. Wellington of this State announced his opposition to the present Republican Administration, and his determination to support Mr. Bryan. He said he had taken this position against the party which had elected him Senator because of his views upon the Spanish war and its consequences, and because of his opposition to imperialism. Senator Wellington was listened to with interest, and was frequently applauded, although at times there were very pronounced hisses. In the course of his speech he said: 'As the Governmental policy of President McKinley was developed I was compelled to differ from it at several points and gave evidence of my disagreement in the speeches delivered by me during the last three years upon the floor of the Senate, touching the Spanish–American war, the Philippine Islands, Porto Rico, and the South African affairs. I am here to-night to reiterate the convictions I voiced in the Senate and record my opposition to the principles of President McKinley as evidenced in his foreign policy and protest against the violation of the principles upon which our Government is founded, against the desecration of the Constitution, and the reversal of the policy which has given us a century and a quarter of National life.'

After the shooting of President McKinley on September 6, 1901, Wellington was reportedly asked for his thoughts, and was widely quoted as saying, "McKinley and I are enemies. He has been guilty of an unpardonable offense toward me. I cannot say anything good for him, and I do not think it the time to say anything bad. I despise the man. I have no use for him, and there is no reason for my saying anything. I am totally indifferent in the matter." The alleged comment horrified many; the Union League Club of Maryland unanimously voted to remove him from its membership rolls, and there were numerous newspaper editorials calling for him to be expelled from the Senate. After a lengthy public silence, Wellington eventually denied that he had made any such remark, but one newspaper described it as "his worst break". When the Maryland General Assembly voted to choose the state's next senator in January 1902, Wellington did not receive a single vote.

In 1913, Wellington again sought election as senator, but as a member of the Progressive Party. He was not elected and, following the election, he engaged in civic activities. He became president of two banks and held an interest in the electric railways and electric companies in his hometown of Cumberland.

Wellington died in Cumberland, and is buried at Rose Hill Cemetery.

== Bibliography ==
- United States Congress. "George L. Wellington (id: W000279)". Biographical Directory of the United States Congress.

U.S. House of Representatives
Preceded by William McMahon McKaig	U.S. Congressman, Maryland's 6th District; 1895–1897	Succeeded by John McDonald
U.S. Senate
Preceded by Charles H. Gibson	U.S. senator (Class 3) from Maryland; 1897–1903; Served alongside: Arthur P. Gorman, Louis E. McComas	Succeeded by Arthur P. Gorman
