= William A. Upshur =

American Republican

William A. Upshur Jr.

Member of the Pennsylvania House of Representatives
- In office 1947–1948

Personal details
- Born: January 8, 1894 Atlantic City, New Jersey, U.S.
- Died: May 5, 1963 (aged 69)
- Party: Republican
- Education: University of Pennsylvania
- Occupation: Porter, Clerk, Undertaker

William Arthur Upshur Jr. (January 8, 1894 – May 5, 1963) was a porter, clerk, undertaker, and state legislator in Pennsylvania. He served during World War I. He worked at Green's Hotel on Chestnut Street. He was a Republican.

He was born in Atlantic City, New Jersey. He graduated from the University of Pennsylvania.

He served in the Pennsylvania House of Representatives during the 1947-1948 session.

He was an alternate delegate from Philadelphia to the 1948 Republican National Convention. He was photographed meeting Richard Nixon at the 1960 Republican National Convention. He was an undertaker.

== See also ==
- List of African-American officeholders (1900–1959)
- Upshur (disambiguation)
