= John B. Brown =

American politician and lawyer (1836–1898)

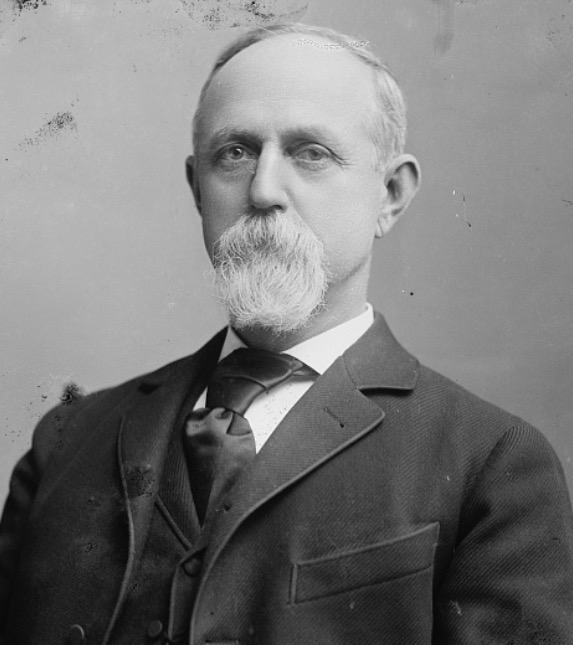
- Portrait of Brown by Charles Milton Bell, taken between January 1891 and January 1894

Member of the U.S. House of Representatives from Maryland's 1st district
- In office November 8, 1892 – March 3, 1893
- Preceded by: Henry Page
- Succeeded by: Robert F. Brattan

Member of the Maryland House of Delegates from the unknown district
- In office 1870

Member of the Maryland Senate
- In office 1888 – 1892

Personal details
- Born: John Brewer Brown; May 13, 1836 Philadelphia, Pennsylvania, US
- Died: May 16, 1898 (aged 62) Centreville, Maryland, US
- Party: Democratic
- Occupation: Politician, lawyer

John Brewer Brown (May 13, 1836 – May 16, 1898) was an American politician and lawyer. A Democrat, he was a member of the United States House of Representatives from Maryland.

== Biography ==
Brown was born on May 13, 1836, in Philadelphia, the son of Madison Brown and Ellen Pratt Brown. He studied at the Centreville Academy and Dickinson College. He lived in Rio de Janeiro for some years, working for a coffee company. He read law, and in 1858 or 1867, was admitted to the bar, after which he began practicing law in Centreville. Beginning in 1864, he began buying and operating farms.

Brown was a Democrat. In 1870, he was a member of the Maryland House of Delegates, and from 1888 to 1892, was a member of the Maryland Senate. He was a delegate to the 1888 Democratic National Convention. Following the resignation of Henry Page, he was a member of the United States House of Representatives, representing Maryland's 1st district from November 8, 1892, to March 3, 1893. He refused to run for the following election. Ideologically, he was liberal and progressive.

After serving in Congress, Brown returned to practicing law. For a time, he was president of the Centreville Building and Loan Association. In 1862, he married Fannie K. Bryan, with whom he had four children. He was Anglician. In February 1898, he travelled to Baltimore to undergo surgery for treating his cirrhosis, though the operation was not performed. He died on May 16, 1898, aged 62, in Centreville, from cirrhosis, and was buried at Chesterfield Cemetery, in Centreville.

U.S. House of Representatives
Preceded by Henry Page	Member of the U.S. House of Representatives from Maryland's 1st congressional district November 8, 1892 – March 3, 1893	Succeeded by Robert F. Brattan
