= George A. Pearre =

American politician

George Alexander Pearre
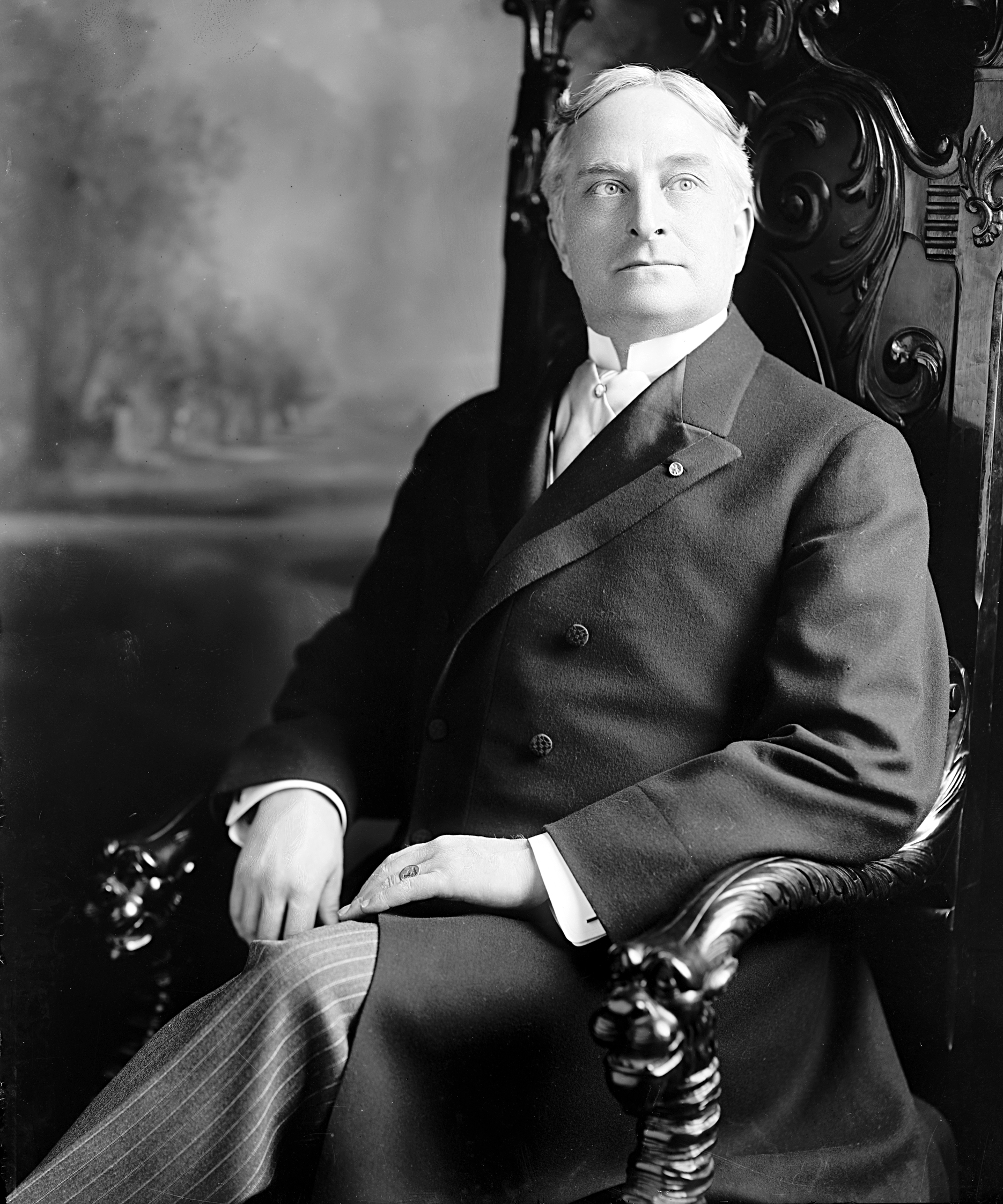

Member of the U.S. House of Representatives from Maryland's 6th district
- In office March 4, 1899 – March 3, 1911
- Preceded by: John McDonald
- Succeeded by: William Devereux Byron

Member of the Maryland Senate
- In office 1890–1892

Personal details
- Born: July 16, 1860 Cumberland, Maryland, U.S.
- Died: September 19, 1923 (aged 63) Cumberland, Maryland, U.S.
- Education: Princeton University; University of Maryland, Baltimore; West Virginia University

Military service
- Allegiance: United States
- Branch/service: United States Army
- Rank: Lieutenant colonel
- Unit: Maryland National Guard

George Alexander Pearre (July 16, 1860 – September 19, 1923) was an American politician.

Born in Cumberland, Maryland, Pearre attended private schools, the Allegany County Academy at Cumberland, St. James College near Hagerstown, and Princeton College. He graduated from West Virginia University at Morgantown in 1880 and from the law department of the University of Maryland, Baltimore in 1882. He was admitted to the bar in 1882 and commenced practice in Cumberland in 1887. He later served as adjutant and lieutenant colonel in the Maryland National Guard from 1887 to 1892.

Pearre was elected to the Maryland State Senate in 1890, and served until 1892. He was prosecuting attorney of Allegany County, Maryland, from 1895 to 1899, and was elected as a Republican to the Fifty-sixth and to the five succeeding Congresses, serving from March 4, 1899, to March 3, 1911. He declined to be a candidate for reelection in 1910 to the Sixty-second Congress, and engaged in the practice of his profession until his death in Cumberland. He is interred in Rose Hill Cemetery.

U.S. House of Representatives
Preceded by John McDonald	Representative of the 6th Congressional District of Maryland; 1899—1911	Succeeded by David John Lewis
