= Charles H. Gibson =

American politician (1842–1900)

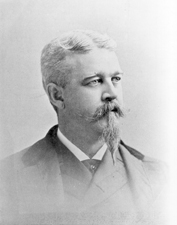

United States Senator from Maryland
- In office November 19, 1891 – March 4, 1897
- Preceded by: Ephraim K. Wilson II
- Succeeded by: George Wellington

Member of the U.S. House of Representatives from Maryland's 1st district
- In office March 4, 1885 – March 3, 1891
- Preceded by: George W. Covington
- Succeeded by: Henry Page

Personal details
- Born: Charles Hopper Gibson; January 19, 1842 Centerville, Maryland, U.S.
- Died: March 31, 1900 (aged 58) Washington, D.C., U.S.
- Resting place: Chesterfield Cemetery
- Party: Democratic

Charles Hopper Gibson (January 19, 1842 – March 31, 1900) was a U. S. Senator from Maryland, serving from 1891 to 1897. He also served as a U.S. Congressman from 1885 to 1891.

== Biography ==
Gibson was born near Centreville, Maryland, and attended the Centreville Academy and the Archer School in Harford County. He graduated from Washington College in Chestertown, Maryland, engaged in the study law, and was admitted to the bar in 1864, commencing practice in Easton, Maryland.

President Andrew Johnson appointed Gibson as collector of internal revenue for the Maryland Eastern Shore district in 1867, but Gibson was not confirmed. He became auditor and commissioner in chancery in 1869 and resigned in 1870 to accept the appointment of State's attorney for Talbot County, Maryland, serving from 1871 until 1875.

Gibson was elected as a Democrat to the Forty-ninth, Fiftieth, and Fifty-first Congresses from Maryland's 1st congressional district, serving from March 4, 1885, until March 3, 1891, but was not a candidate for reelection in 1890. He married Marieta Powell Hollyday in 1889, and the couple lived at Ratcliffe Manor in Talbot County. He was appointed and subsequently elected as a Democrat to the United States Senate to fill the vacancy caused by the death of Ephraim King Wilson II, and served in that position from November 19, 1891, until March 3, 1897. As senator, Gibson served as chairman of the Committee on Manufactures (Fifty-third Congress).

After his service as U.S. senator, Gibson resumed the practice of law, and later died in Washington, D.C., in 1900. He is interred in Chesterfield Cemetery in his home town of Centreville.

U.S. House of Representatives
Preceded by George Washington Covington	Member of the U.S. House of Representatives from Maryland's 1st congressional district 1885–1891	Succeeded by Henry Page
U.S. Senate
Preceded by Ephraim K. Wilson	U.S. senator (Class 3) from Maryland; 1891–1897; Served alongside: Arthur P. Gorman	Succeeded by George Wellington
