= 48th Mississippi Infantry Regiment =

19th century confederate infantry unit from Mississippi

48th Mississippi Infantry Regiment 2nd Battalion, Mississippi Infantry
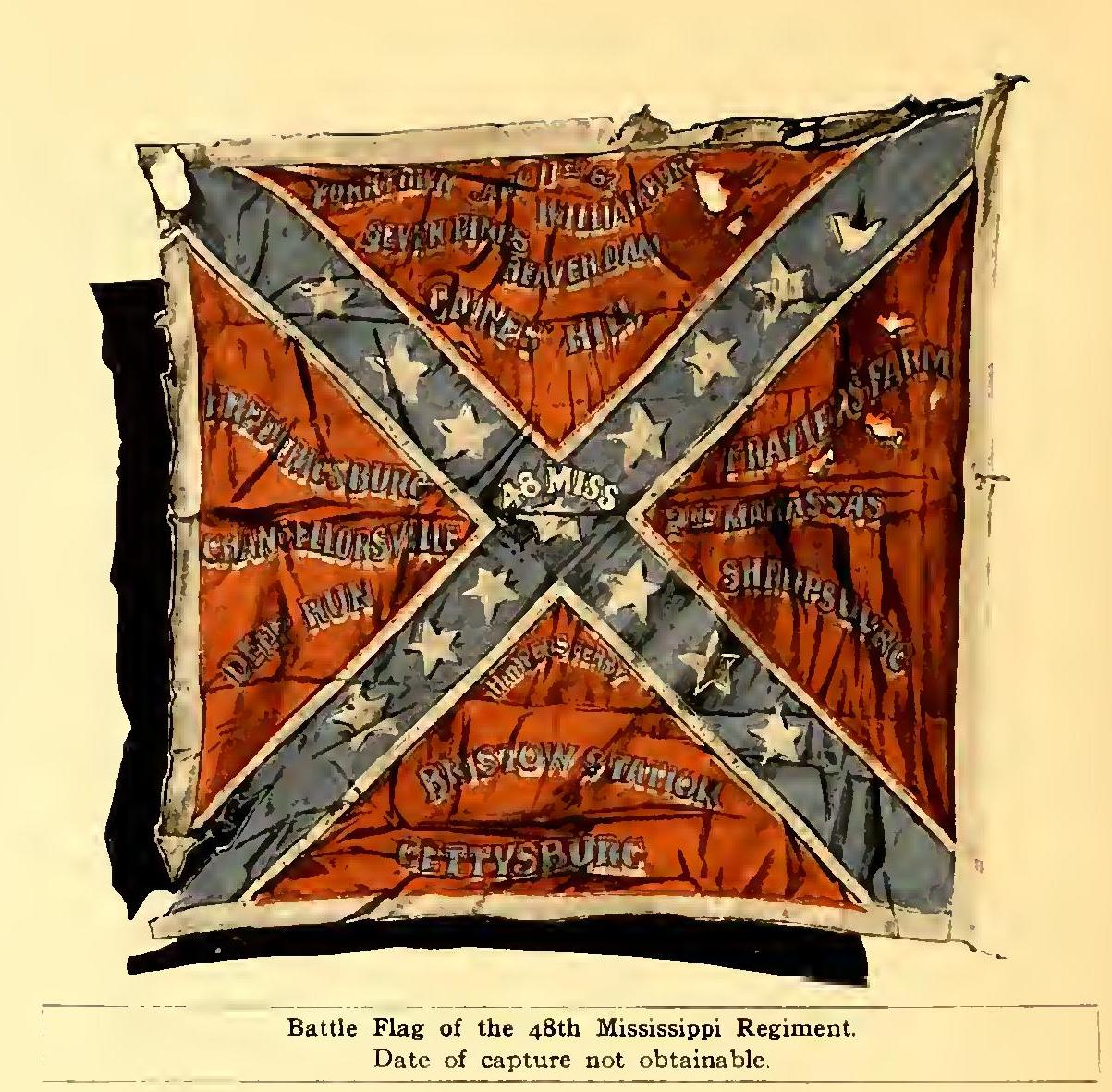
- Battle flag of the 48th Mississippi Regiment
- Active: 1861–1865
- Country: Confederate States
- Allegiance: Mississippi
- Branch: Confederate States Army
- Type: Infantry
- Size: Battalion; Regiment
- Battles: American Civil War: Battle of Williamsburg; Seven Days Battles; Battle of Second Manassas; Battle of Antietam; Battle of Chancellorsville; Battle of the Wilderness; Battle of Spotsylvania Courthouse; Second Battle of Fredericksburg; Battle of Gettysburg; Battle of Cold Harbor; Richmond-Petersburg Campaign; Third Battle of Petersburg

The 48th Mississippi Infantry Regiment was a unit of the Confederate States Army in the American Civil War. Originally formed as the 2nd Battalion, Mississippi Infantry, the regiment was part of the Army of Northern Virginia and fought in many battles of the Eastern theater of the American Civil War before the Confederate surrender in 1865.

== History ==
At the outbreak of secession, many volunteers in southern states began organizing themselves into military companies, and several Mississippi companies traveled by rail to Virginia before being formally mustered into the army. A group of these units was organized as the 2nd Battalion, Mississippi Infantry, by order of the Confederate War Department on October 16, 1861.

Stationed at Yorktown, Virginia, the 2nd Battalion fought at the Battle of Williamsburg during the opening of the Peninsula Campaign, losing 5 killed and 30 wounded. Assigned to the brigade of General Jubal Early, the battalion fought at the Battle of Seven Pines, losing 1 killed and 26 wounded, and was then reassigned to General Winfield S. Featherston's Mississippi brigade. During the Seven Days Battles, commanding officer of the battalion Lt. Col. John G. Taylor was mortally wounded at the Battle of Glendale, June 30, 1862. Losses of the battalion during the Seven Days battles were 22 killed and 91 wounded.

The battalion fought at the Battle of Second Manassas and Antietam, afterwards it was upgraded to a Regiment and redesignated as the 48th Mississippi Infantry in November 1862. Captain Joseph M. Jayne was promoted to Colonel and assigned to command the regiment.

Assigned to General Carnot Posey's brigade, the 48th fought at Battle of Chancellorsville, where Col. Jayne was wounded, and at the Second Battle of Fredericksburg. The regiment took part in the Battle of Gettysburg, with 6 killed and 42 wounded, and then retreated into Virginia, where brigade commander Posey was killed at the Battle of Bristoe Station. The 48th fought at the Battle of the Wilderness, was under intense fire at the Battle of Spotsylvania Courthouse and took part in the Battle of Cold Harbor, before retreating towards the Confederate capitol.

Transferred within the fortified lines during the Siege of Petersburg, the 48th fought several battles as Union troops tried to force their way through the defenses. The 48th took part in the last-ditch defense of Fort Gregg, and most of the regiment was captured when the Union troops broke through the Confederate fortifications on April 2. The remnants of the regiment, only 11 officers and 87 soldiers, surrendered at Appomattox Courthouse on April 12, 1865.

== Commanders ==
Commanders of the 2nd Battalion/48th Regiment Mississippi Infantry:

- Col. Joseph M. Jayne, wounded at Chancellorsville, 1863.
- Lt. Col. Thomas B. Manlove, wounded at the Wilderness, 1864.
- Lt. Col. John G. Taylor, killed at Glendale, 1862.
- Maj. William Sydney Wilson, mortally wounded at Antietam, 1862.

== Organization ==
Companies of the 2nd Battalion/48th Regiment Mississippi Infantry:

- "King Cotton Guards" of Vicksburg.
- Company B, "Rocky Point Rifles" of Attala County.
- "Dixie Boys" of Yalobusha County.
- "Oktibbeha Rescue"
- "Blewett's Company" of Columbus.
- "Manlove's Company" of Warren County.

== See also ==
- List of Mississippi Civil War Confederate units
