= John McDonald (Maryland politician) =

American soldier and politician from Maryland (1837–1917)

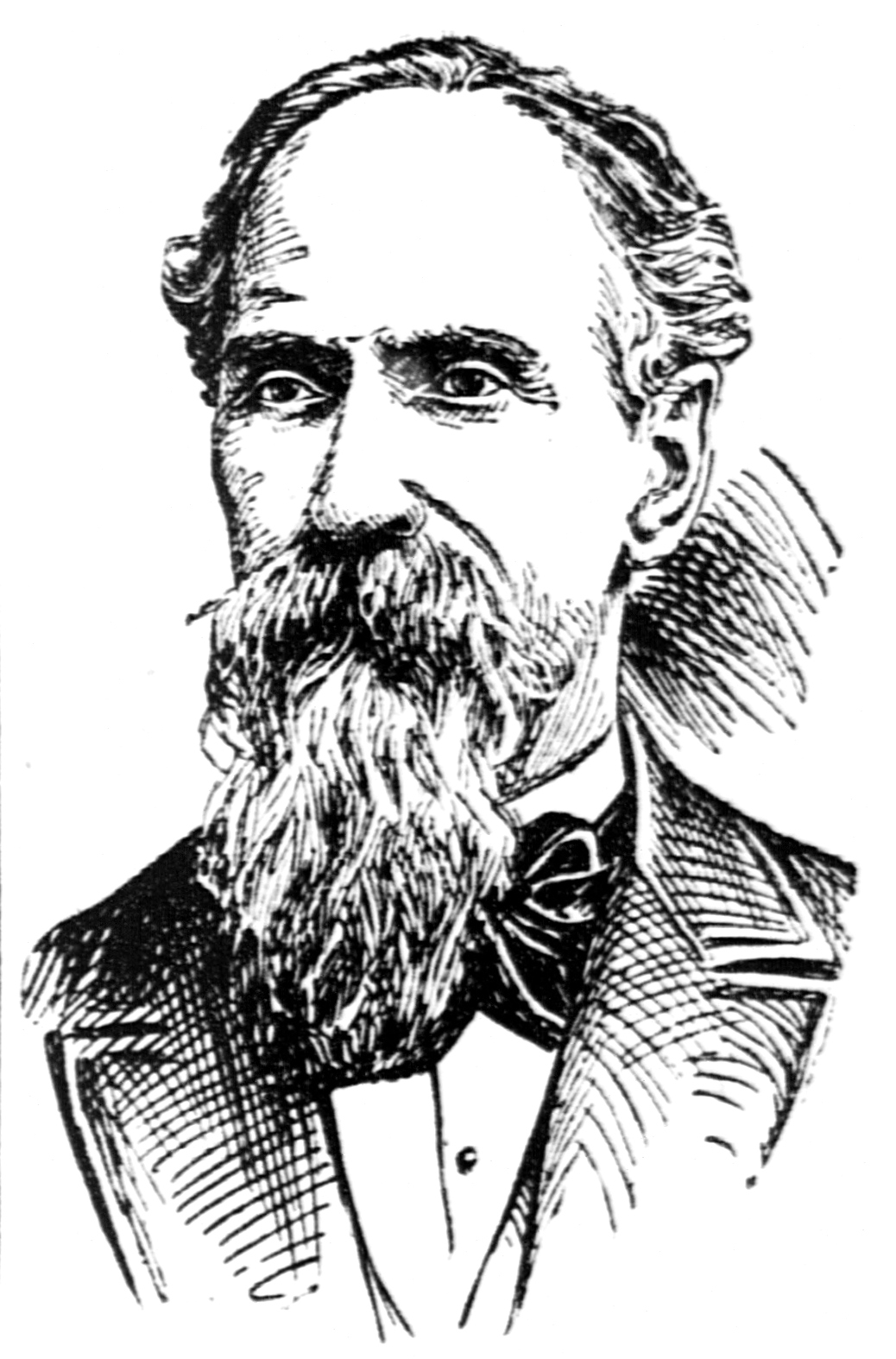

Member of the U.S. House of Representatives from Maryland's 6th district
- In office March 4, 1897 – March 3, 1899
- Preceded by: George L. Wellington
- Succeeded by: George Alexander Pearre

Personal details
- Born: May 24, 1837 Dingle, County Kerry, Ireland
- Died: January 30, 1917 (aged 79) Rockville, Maryland, U.S.
- Party: Republican

Military service
- Allegiance: (United States) United States; Union
- Branch/service: United States Army; Union Army
- Years of service: 1857–1868
- Rank: Captain
- Unit: Army of the Potomac
- Battles/wars: American Civil War

John McDonald (May 24, 1837 – January 30, 1917) was an American soldier and politician.

Born in Dingle, County Kerry, Ireland, McDonald attended local schools. He immigrated to the United States and enlisted in the United States Army at Boston, Massachusetts, in 1857. He joined his regiment in Arizona, and served in the Cavalry Corps of the Army of the Potomac throughout the American Civil War. After the war, McDonald was ordered to the West, where he again took part in several campaigns against Native Americans. He retired as a captain of Cavalry on July 1, 1868, for disabilities incurred in the line of service.

After his retirement from the military, McDonald settled in Maryland and was elected as a Republican to the Maryland House of Delegates in 1881. He was later elected to the Fifty-fifth Congress, and served from March 4, 1897, to March 3, 1899. He engaged in agricultural pursuits near Potomac, Maryland, and died in Rockville, Maryland. He is interred in Union Cemetery.

U.S. House of Representatives
Preceded by George Louis Wellington	Representative of the 6th Congressional District of Maryland; 1897–1899	Succeeded by George Alexander Pearre
