= Green's Hotel =

Historic hotel in Philadelphia Pennsylvania

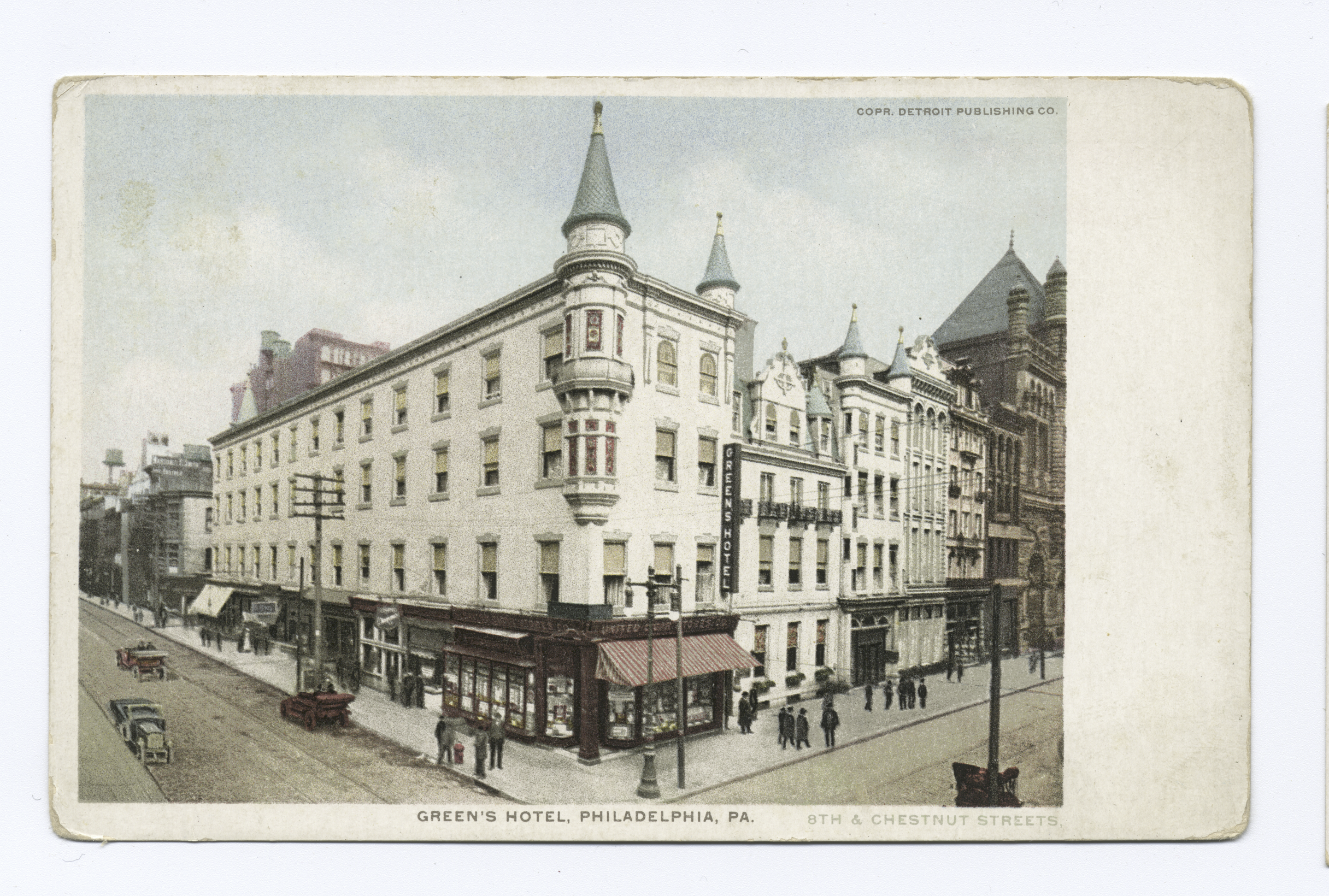
An illustration of the hotel

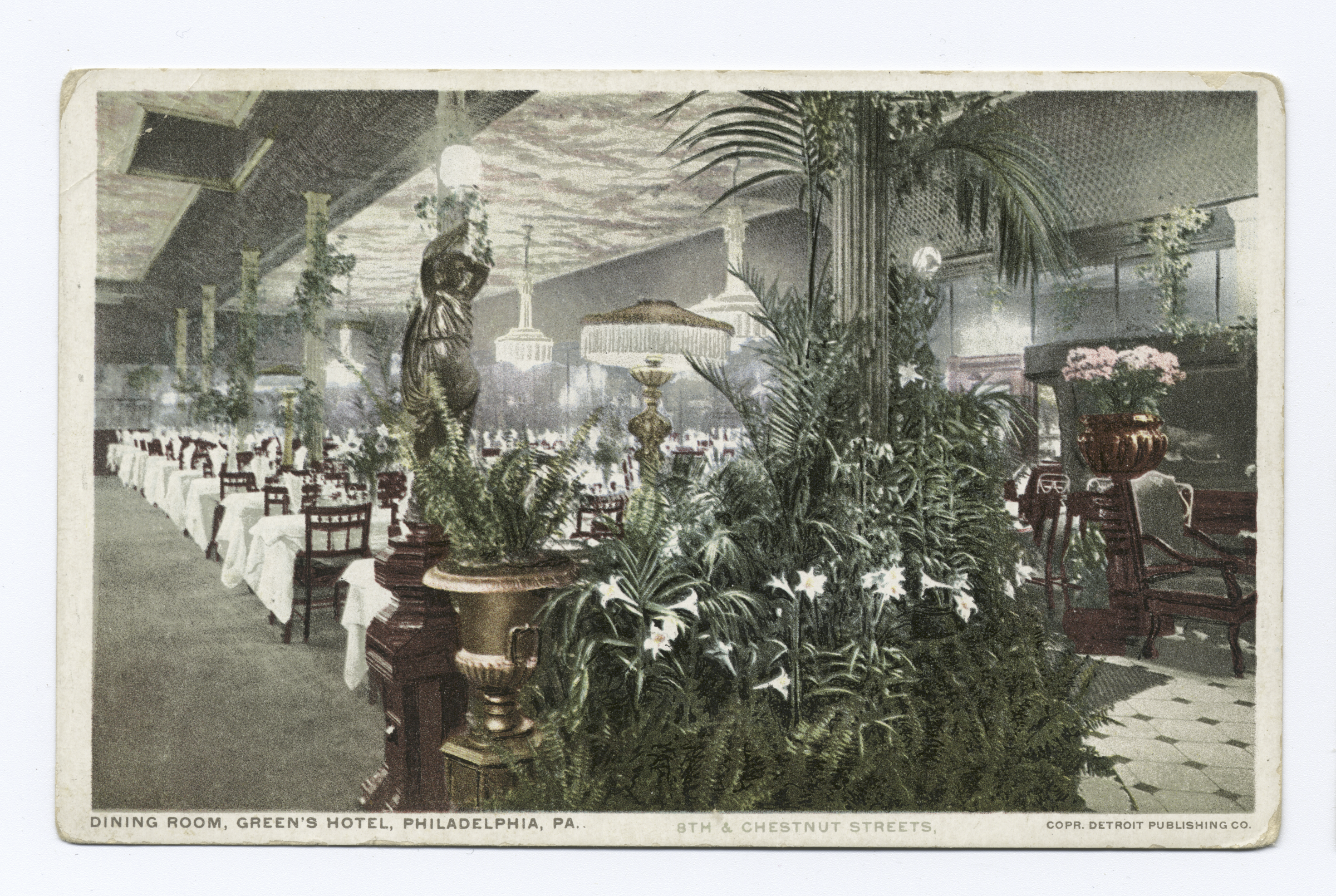
Dining toom

Green's Hotel was a historic hotel in Philadelphia, Pennsylvania. The hotel was organized in 1883 by incorporating several notable Philadelphia buildings at 731 Chestnut Street at Eighth Street - Thomas H. Green's restaurant (opened in 1866), the Edward Shippen house, Philemon Dickenson house, and the Union Building.

A notable feature of the hotel was its bar which had a ceiling with an Arctic effect, complete with snowy vistas and icicles. The bar was replaced with a soda fountain in 1922.

Thomas H. Green was the proprietor. Chester Hughes Kirk (born June 11, 1869) was the architect. He was born in Philadelphia and worked as an architect for 12 years prior to moving to New York City, Helena, Montana, and Los Angeles.

The site where the hotel was located served as a headquarters for George Washington. President Ulysses S. Grant stayed at the hotel. The hotel retained and restored the original room where Benedict Arnold was married to Peggy Shippen.

The state assemblyman William A. Upshur worked at the hotel.

Frank Hamilton Taylor made an albumen print photograph of the building. The hotel, which grew to become a 320 room hotel, was demolished in 1934 and replaced by a parking lot.

The Library of Congress holds a dry plate negative of the hotel. Detroit Publishing Company produced images of the hotel and its dining room.
