= Edward H. C. Long =

American politician

Edward Henry Carroll Long

Member of the U.S. House of Representatives from Maryland's 6th district
- In office March 4, 1845 – March 3, 1847
- Preceded by: Thomas Ara Spence
- Succeeded by: John Woodland Crisfield

Member of the Maryland House of Delegates
- In office 1833-1835; 1839; 1844; 1861

Member of the Maryland Senate
- In office 1860

Personal details
- Born: September 28, 1808 Princess Anne, Maryland, U.S.
- Died: October 16, 1865 (aged 57) Princess Anne, Maryland, U.S.
- Party: Whig
- Spouse: Amelia Roach
- Children: 5
- Education: Yale College
- Profession: farmer; lawyer; politician

Edward Henry Carroll Long (September 28, 1808 – October 16, 1865) was a farmer, a lawyer, an American politician and a U.S. Representative from Maryland.

== Biography ==
Born in Princess Anne, Maryland, Long was the son of Zadock and Leah Whittington Long; attended the common schools and graduated from Yale College in 1828. He studied law, was admitted to the bar in 1830, and commenced practice in Princess Anne. He was also engaged in agricultural pursuits. He married Amelia Roach and they had five children.

== Career ==
Long was a member of the Maryland House of Delegates from 1833 to 1835, 1839, 1844, and 1861. He served in the Maryland State Senate in 1860.

Elected from the sixth district of Maryland as a Whig to the Twenty-ninth Congress, Long served from March 4, 1845, to March 3, 1847. He was not a candidate for renomination in 1846, and resumed the practice of his profession and also engaged in agricultural pursuits on his family farm, "Catalpa". He was an unsuccessful candidate for election to the United States Senate in 1860.

== Death ==
Long died in Princess Anne, Maryland, on October 16, 1865. He is interred at the Catalpa Family Farm, Princess Anne, Somerset County, Maryland.

U.S. House of Representatives
Preceded by Thomas Ara Spence	Representative of the 6th Congressional District of Maryland; 1845–1847	Succeeded by John Woodland Crisfield
