= Ephraim King Wilson =

American politician (1771–1834)

Member of the U.S. House of Representatives from Maryland's 8th district
- In office March 4, 1827 – March 3, 1831
- Preceded by: Robert N. Martin
- Succeeded by: John S. Spence

Personal details
- Born: September 15, 1771 Snow Hill, Maryland, U.S.
- Died: January 2, 1834 (aged 62) Snow Hill, Maryland, U.S.
- Resting place: Makemie Memorial Presbyterian Church; Snow Hill, Maryland, U.S.
- Party: Democratic
- Children: 3, including Ephraim King II and William Sydney

Ephraim King Wilson (September 15, 1771 – January 2, 1834) was a U.S. representative for Maryland.

Wilson was born near Snow Hill, Maryland, on September 15, 1771. He graduated from Princeton College in 1790, studied law and was admitted to the bar in 1792. He opened a practice in Snow Hill and was elected from the eighth district of Maryland to the Twentieth Congress and reelected as a Jacksonian to the Twenty-first Congress. He resumed his law practice in Snow Hill after a failed nomination to the Twenty-second Congress and continued his practice until his death in Snow Hill on January 2, 1834. He is buried in the churchyard of Makemie Memorial Presbyterian Church. He was also the father of Ephraim King Wilson II and William Sydney Wilson. His daughter was the second wife of Maryland Court of Appeals judge Ara Spence.

U.S. House of Representatives
Preceded by Robert N. Martin	Member of the U.S. House of Representatives from Maryland's 8th congressional district 1827–1831	Succeeded by John S. Spence
