= Thomas A. Spence =

American politician

Thomas Ara Spence (February 20, 1810 – November 10, 1877) was an American politician.

Born near the Accomack Court House in Accomack County, Virginia, Spence pursued academic studies and attended a local academy. He graduated from Yale College in 1829, studied law, and was admitted to the bar, commencing practice at Snow Hill, Maryland. He was elected as a Whig to the Twenty-eighth Congress, serving from March 4, 1843, to March 3, 1845. He was not a candidate for renomination, and was later affiliated with the Republican Party.

Spence owned large iron-ore properties in Worcester County, Maryland, and served as a judge for Worcester County and the twelfth judicial circuit from 1857 to 1867. He practiced law in Salisbury, Maryland, and served as assistant attorney general for the Post Office Department from 1872 until his death in Washington, D.C.. He is interred in Makamie Memorial Church Cemetery in Snow Hill.

Thomas Spence was nephew to John Selby Spence, another Maryland Congressman.

U.S. House of Representatives
Preceded by John Thomson Mason, Jr.	Representative of the 6th Congressional District of Maryland; 1843–1845	Succeeded by Edward Henry Carroll Long
