= William J. Blakistone =

American politician and lawyer (died 1882)

Speaker of the Maryland House of Delegates
- In office 1834
- Preceded by: Thomas Wright III
- Succeeded by: Benjamin L. Gantt
- In office 1847
- Preceded by: John P. Kennedy
- Succeeded by: John Rankin Franklin

Member of the Maryland House of Delegates
- In office 1827–1834
- In office 1847

Personal details
- Born: Port Tobacco Village, Maryland, U.S.
- Died: January 28, 1882 (aged 78) Baltimore, Maryland, U.S.
- Education: Politician; lawyer

William J. Blakistone (died January 28, 1882) was an American politician and lawyer. He served as a member of the Maryland House of Delegates from 1827 to 1834 and in 1847. He served as the Speaker of the Maryland House of Delegates in 1834 and 1837.

== Early life ==
William J. Blakistone was born near Port Tobacco Village, Maryland, in Charles County, Maryland, to Colonel Thomas Blakistone. His father was a lawyer. At the age of twenty, Blakistone was admitted to the bar in Leonardtown, Maryland.

== Career ==
Blakistone served as a member of the Maryland House of Delegates, representing St. Mary's County, from 1827 to 1834 and in 1847. He served as Speaker of the Maryland House of Delegates in 1834 and 1847. In 1832, he served as speaker pro tempore. He served in the constitutional convention of 1850–1851.

== Personal life ==
Blakistone died on January 28, 1882, in Baltimore. He was 78 years old.
