= Rehobeth Presbyterian Church =

Historic church in Maryland, US

- Rehoboth Presbyterian Church
- U.S. National Register of Historic Places
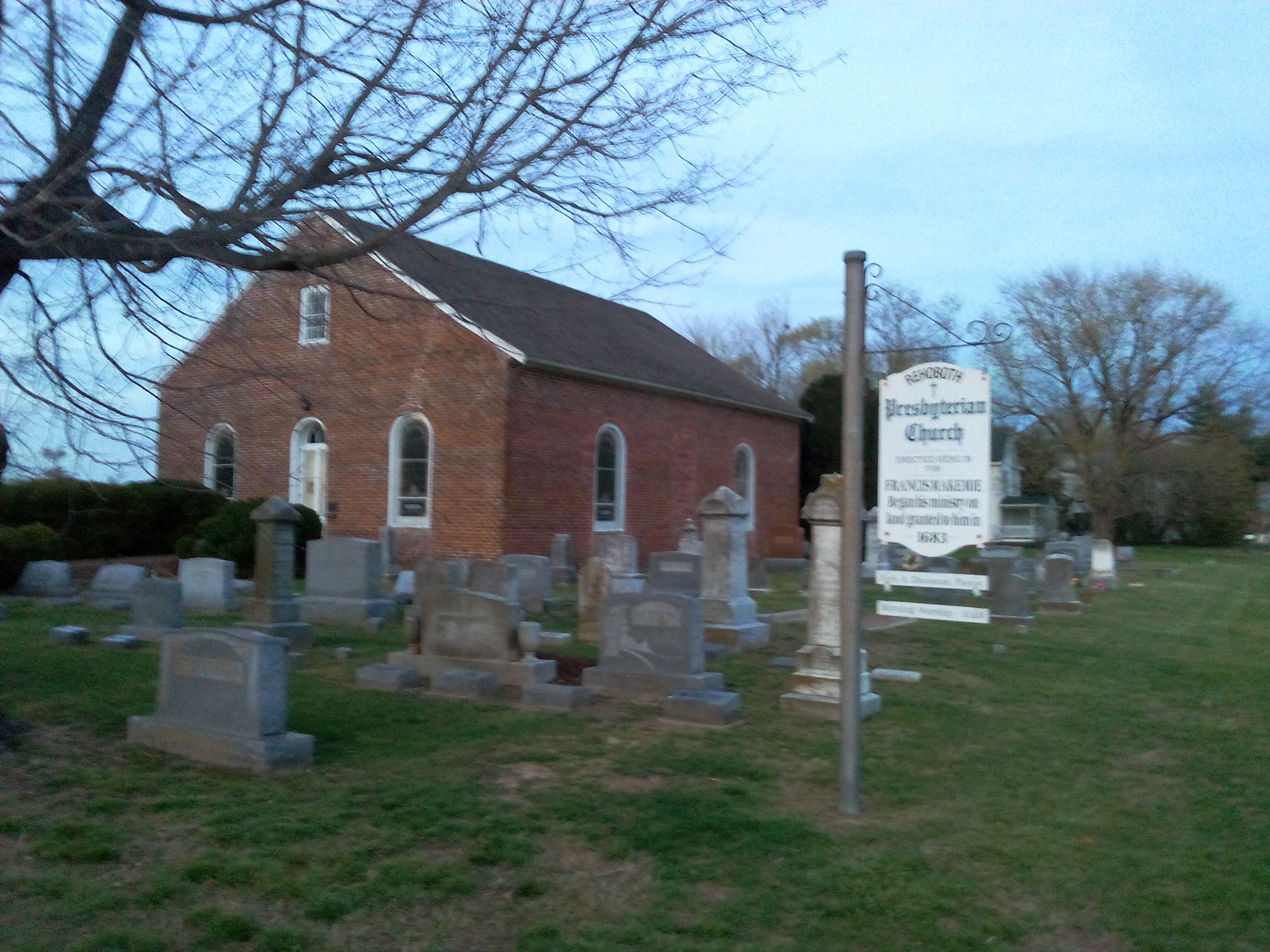

- Location within Maryland Location within the United States
- Location: S of Rehoboth off MD 667, Rehoboth, Maryland, USA
- Coordinates: 38°2′21″N 75°39′53″W
- Area: less than one acre
- Built: 1706
- NRHP reference No.: 74000964
- Added to NRHP: November 5, 1974

Rehoboth Presbyterian Church is a historic Presbyterian church located at Rehoboth, Maryland, United States, near the Pocomoke River and Chesapeake Bay.

Founded by Francis Makemie in 1683, the Rehoboth Church is the oldest continuously Presbyterian church in America. The current church structure was built by Makemie on his own land at personal expense in 1706. The building received extensive interior modifications and rearrangement of some windows and doors in 1888, and further renovations were completed in 1956.

William Stevens, an influential Somerset County citizen and member of the established Church of England (attending at the nearby Coventry Parish Ruins) issued a call to the Reverend Francis Makemie (1658–1708), an Ulster Scots clergyman who arrived in the colony and became known as the "Father of American Presbyterianism."

The old church is a simple one-story Flemish bond brick building, three bays wide by three deep, constructed about 1706. It was remodeled in 1888, and the original clear glass windows were replaced with the present leaded ones. The interior features a barrel-vault wooden ceiling, box pews with single raised panel on the ends, and a paneled gallery. A cemetery surrounds it, and several other buildings in complementary styles were erected nearby.

It was listed on the National Register of Historic Places in 1974.
