= George M. Upshur =

American politician and lawyer (1847–1924)

George Martin Upshur Jr.
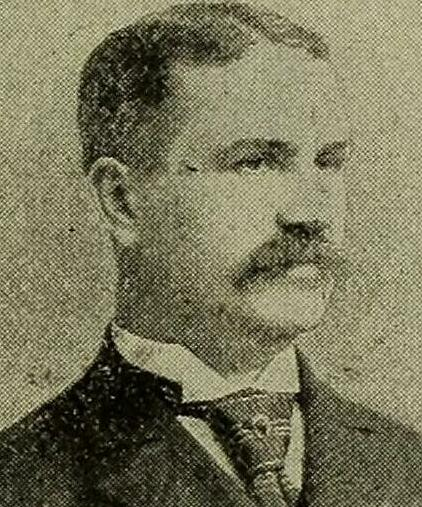
- Upshur in an 1893 publication

President of the Baltimore Board of Police Commissioners
- In office May 7, 1900–May 2, 1904
- Preceded by: Daniel C. Heddinger
- Succeeded by: George R. Willis

Mayor of Ocean City, Maryland
- In office 1896–1898

Speaker of the Maryland House of Delegates
- In office 1888
- Preceded by: Joseph B. Seth
- Succeeded by: John Hubner

Member of the Maryland House of Delegates
- In office 1888

Personal details
- Born: December 14, 1847 Snow Hill, Maryland, U.S.
- Died: May 26, 1924 (aged 76) Snow Hill, Maryland, U.S.
- Resting place: Makemie Memorial Presbyterian Church; Snow Hill, Maryland, U.S.
- Party: Democratic
- Spouse: Sarah Emmaline Franklin (m. 1873; died 1903)
- Children: 4, including Franklin
- Relatives: Abel P. Upshur; George Yeardley
- Education: Yale University
- Occupation: Politician; lawyer

George Martin Upshur Jr. (December 14, 1847 – May 26, 1924) was an American politician and lawyer from Snow Hill, Maryland. He served in the Maryland House of Delegates and as speaker of the Maryland House of Delegates in 1888. Upshur served as mayor of Ocean City, Maryland, from 1896 to 1898. He was president of the Baltimore City Board of Police Commissioners from 1900 to 1904.

== Early life ==
George Martin Upshur Jr. was born on December 14, 1847, in Snow Hill, Maryland, to Priscilla (née Townsend) and Dr. George Martin Upshur. He was a descendant of George Yeardley, Governor of the Colony of Virginia. He was educated at Union Academy in Snow Hill. Upshur graduated from Yale University in 1868. He studied law in the office of Ephraim King Wilson II and was admitted to the bar in Snow Hill.

== Career ==
In 1874, Upshur was appointed secretary, treasurer and examiner of Worcester County Public Schools. In 1888, Upshur served in the Maryland House of Delegates and became the Speaker of the Maryland House of Delegates. In 1892, Upshur served as a delegate-at-large from Maryland in the 1892 Democratic National Convention.

In 1892, Upshur moved from Snow Hill to Baltimore to practice law. Upshur served as mayor of Ocean City, Maryland, from 1896 to 1898. On May 7, 1900, Upshur was appointed to the Baltimore City Board of Police Commissioners. He was elected as president of the board and served two terms, until May 2, 1904. In 1902, Upshur was appointed as colonel on the staff of Governor John Walter Smith. Upshur continued practicing law in Baltimore until 1907. In 1907, Upshur returned to Snow Hill and practiced law there.

Upshur was an alternate national commissioner from Maryland to the World's Columbian Exposition. In 1900, Upshur was a director of the Fidelity and Deposit Company of Maryland.

== Personal life ==
Upshur married Sarah Emmaline "Emma" Franklin, daughter of Judge John Rankin Franklin, on June 11, 1873. They had two sons and two daughters: Franklin, George Martin III (died in childhood), Priscilla and Emily Franklin. His wife died in 1903. He was related to Abel P. Upshur, United States Secretary of State under President John Tyler. His son Franklin also served in the Maryland House of Delegates.

While in Baltimore in 1900, Upshur lived at 1022 St. Paul Street.

Upshur died on May 26, 1924, at his home in Snow Hill. Upshur was interred at Makemie Memorial Presbyterian Church in Snow Hill.
