= Ara Spence =

American judge (1793–1866)

Ara Spence (February 26, 1793 – May 27, 1866) was a justice of the Maryland Court of Appeals from 1835 to 1851.

Born in Worcester County, Maryland, Spence married Anna Maria Robins (1798–1827) on September 30, 1818. After her death, Spence remarried to Priscilla Wilson (1813–1837) on February 20, 1833. She was the daughter of Maryland political figure Ephraim King Wilson. After Priscilla's death, Spence remained a widower until his death. Spence owned the Mansion House at Public Landing, where he "spent a long widowerhood... with his servants and numerous cats". Spence was a slaveowner, and one account has him ordering a lazy and impudent slave boy to be thrown in the bay, only to give the boy a reprieve when he objected that he had not yet had breakfast. Spence's will provided for his slaves "to be freed and transported to Liberia following his death".

Political offices
Preceded by William Bond Martin	Judge of the Maryland Court of Appeals; 1835–1851	Succeeded by Court reconfigured
