= Coventry Parish Ruins =

Historic church ruins in Maryland, US

- U.S. National Register of Historic Places
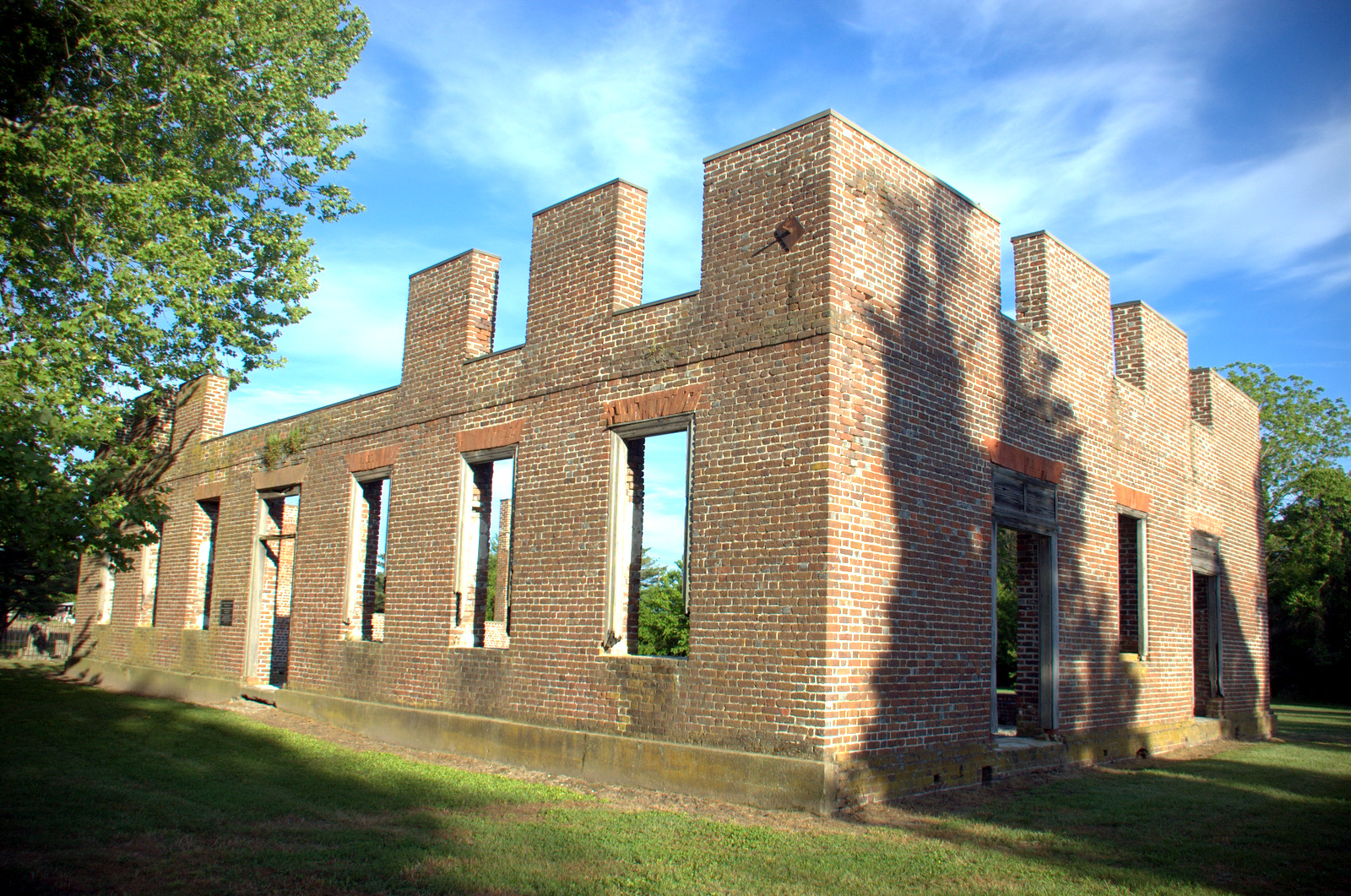
- The ruins in 2017

- Location within Maryland Location within the United States
- Location: Off Maryland Route 667, Rehobeth, Maryland
- Coordinates: 38°2′18″N 75°39′59″W
- Area: 1 acre (0.40 ha)
- Built: 1785
- Built by: Marshall, Isaac & Stephen
- NRHP reference No.: 84001869
- Added to NRHP: August 9, 1984

Coventry Parish Ruins are the remnants of a historic Episcopal church located at Rehobeth, Somerset County, Maryland. Coventry Parish was one of the original 30 Anglican parishes in the Province of Maryland established when Maryland's legislators established the Church of England as the colony's government-supported religion in 1692. These old parishes often had a church and several chapels of ease near population centers. This building, stands surrounded by farm fields and a historic Presbyterian Church near the Pocomoke River in what was then called Rehoboth but is now Rehobeth, Maryland to distinguish it from a beachfront community in Delaware.

Coventry Parish's vestry erected a two-story seven-by-three-bay Flemish bond brick church between 1785 and 1788, one of the most difficult times for the denomination in Maryland, since it reorganized as the Episcopal Church as well as was disestablished (lost state support). At the time of its construction, the 76 foot by 56 foot structure was the largest Episcopal church on Maryland's Eastern Shore, only slightly smaller than Hungars Church further down the Delmarva Peninsula in Northampton County, Virginia. It was partially built using bricks from an older church nearby, which was dismantled. The church remained in use until the late 19th century, when the few remaining parishioners decided to combine with what had been the chapel of ease, St. Paul's at Marion, Maryland (where Maryland route 667, on which this stands connects to U.S. Route 13 down the Delmarva Peninsula, as well as Maryland Route 413). The ruined edifice was stabilized in 1928 and again in 2005.

The ruin has been reduced to three primary walls, since the south wall rises only a foot above ground level, except for one single-story pier, and was once known for its 10 arches.

It was listed on the National Register of Historic Places in 1984.
