= Ephraim K. Wilson II =

American politician (1821–1891)

Ephraim King Wilson
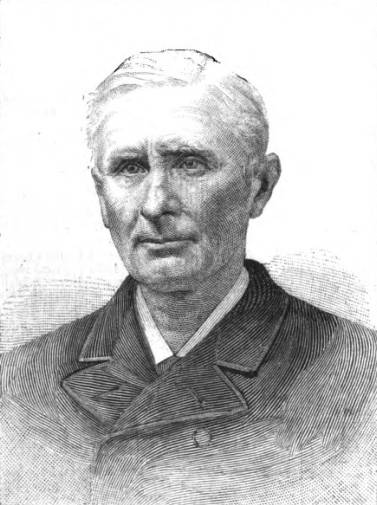

United States Senator from Maryland
- In office March 4, 1885 – February 24, 1891
- Preceded by: James B. Groome
- Succeeded by: Charles H. Gibson

Member of the U.S. House of Representatives from Maryland's 1st district
- In office March 4, 1873 – March 3, 1875
- Preceded by: Samuel Hambleton
- Succeeded by: Philip F. Thomas

Member of the Maryland House of Delegates
- In office 1847

Personal details
- Born: December 22, 1821 Snow Hill, Maryland, U.S.
- Died: February 24, 1891 (aged 69) Washington, D.C., U.S.
- Resting place: Makemie Memorial Presbyterian Church; Snow Hill, Maryland, U.S.
- Party: Democratic
- Parent: Ephraim King Wilson (father)

Ephraim King Wilson II (December 22, 1821 – February 24, 1891) the son of Ephraim King Wilson, was a congressional representative and a senator from Maryland.

== Biography ==
Ephraim King Wilson II was born in Snow Hill, Maryland, and attended Union Academy at Snow Hill and Washington Academy in Princess Anne, Maryland. He graduated from Jefferson College in 1840 and taught school for six years. He studied law and was admitted to the bar in 1848 and began a practice in Snow Hill.

He was a member of the State House of Delegates in 1847 and presidential elector on the Democratic ticket in 1852. Because of ill health he abandoned his law practice in 1867 and retired to his farm. In 1868 he was the examiner and treasurer of the school board of Worcester County, Maryland and was elected as a Democrat to the Forty-third Congress from Maryland's 1st congressional district of Maryland in 1873. He declined to be a candidate for re-nomination in 1874. He was a judge of the first judicial circuit of Maryland from 1878 to 1884 and elected as a Democrat in 1884 to the United States Senate, serving from March 4, 1885 until his death in Washington on February 24, 1891.

He was the grandson of American Revolutionary War hero John Gunby and also the adoptive father of future Governor of Maryland, John Walter Smith. He is buried in the churchyard of Makemie Memorial Presbyterian Church in Snow Hill.

== See also ==
- List of members of the United States Congress who died in office (1790–1899)

U.S. House of Representatives
Preceded by Samuel Hambleton	Member of the U.S. House of Representatives from Maryland's 1st congressional district 1873–1875	Succeeded by Philip Francis Thomas
U.S. Senate
Preceded by James B. Groome	U.S. senator (Class 3) from Maryland; 1885–1891; Served alongside: Arthur P. Gorman	Succeeded by Charles H. Gibson
