= Rehobeth, Maryland =

Unincorporated community in Maryland, United States

- Unincorporated community
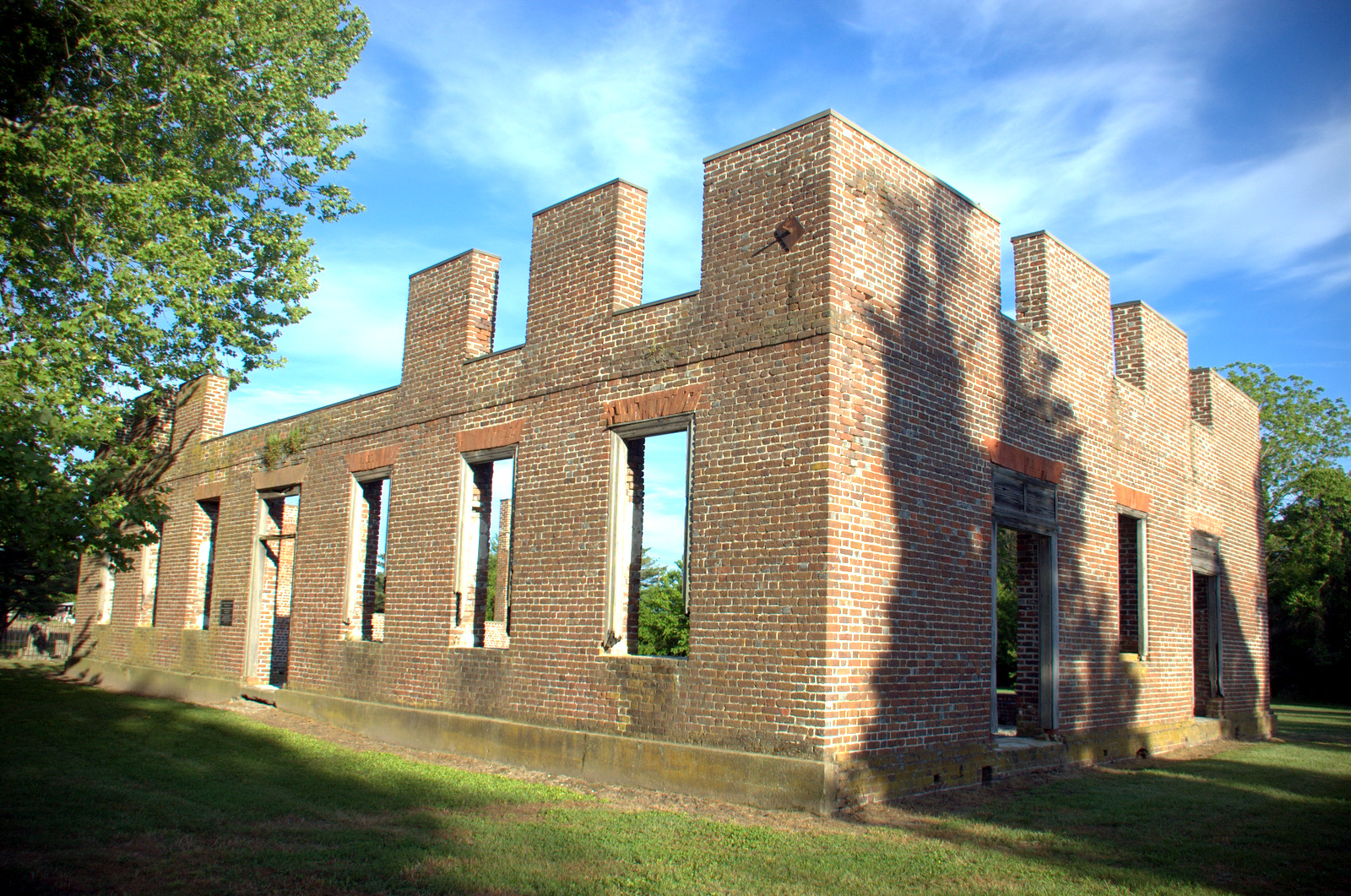
- Coventry Parish ruins

- Location within Maryland
- Coordinates: 38°02′20″N 75°39′47″W
- Country: United States
- State: Maryland
- County: Somerset
- Elevation: 10 ft (3.0 m)
- Time zone: UTC-5 (Eastern (EST))
  - Summer (DST): UTC-4 (EDT)
- ZIP code: 21857
- Area codes: 410, 443, and 667
- GNIS feature ID: 591110

Rehobeth is an unincorporated community in Somerset County, Maryland, United States. It is located at the east end of Old Rehobeth Road, off Rehobeth Road, on the bank of the Pocomoke River. Caldicott, Coventry Parish Ruins, and Rehobeth Presbyterian Church are listed on the National Register of Historic Places.

The community was named after Rehoboth, a place mentioned in the Hebrew Bible, via a local plantation of that name.
