= Beverly Byron =

American politician (1932–2025)

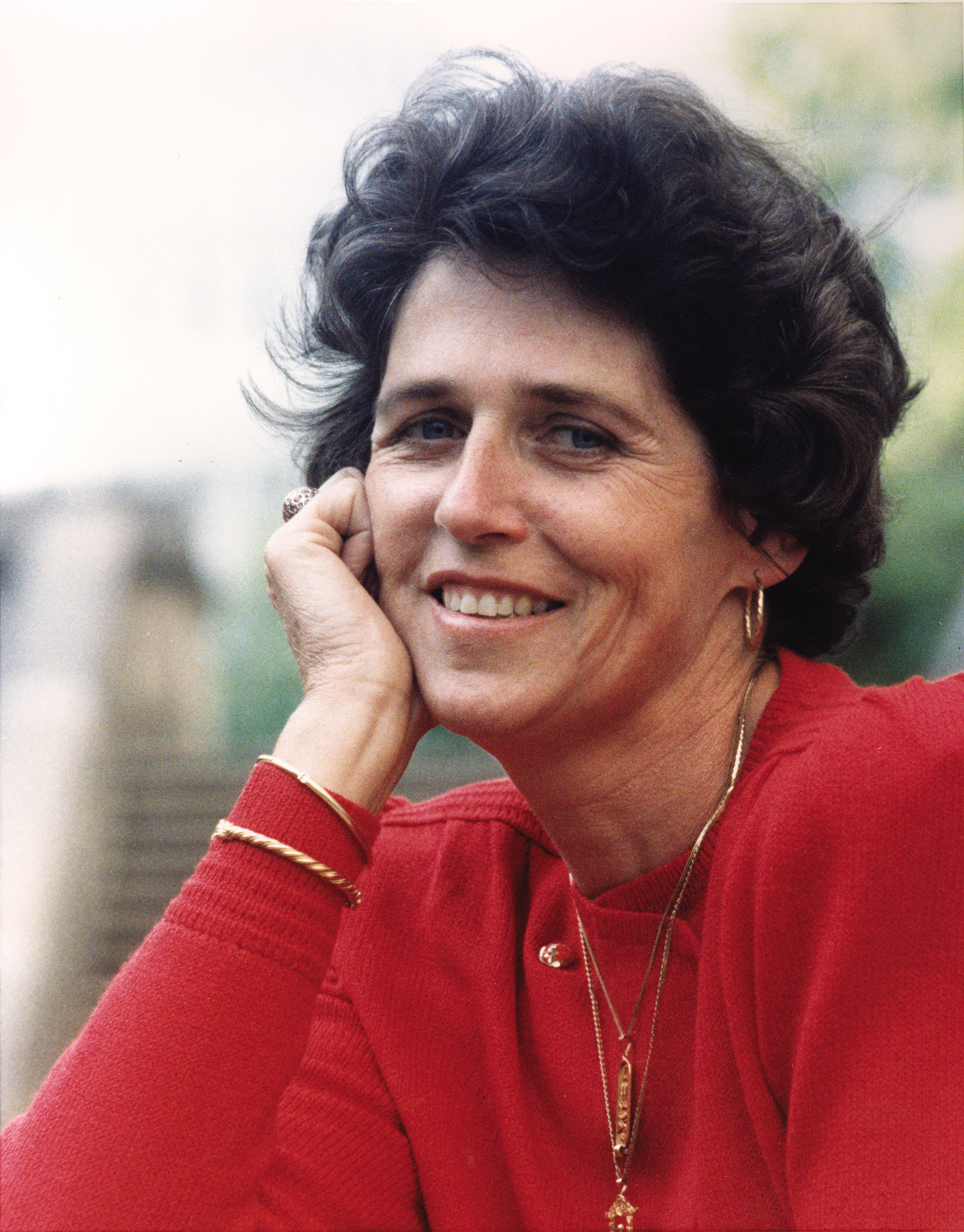

Member of the U.S. House of Representatives from Maryland's 6th district
- In office January 3, 1979 – January 3, 1993
- Preceded by: Goodloe Byron
- Succeeded by: Roscoe Bartlett

Personal details
- Born: Beverly Barton Butcher; July 27, 1932 Baltimore, Maryland, U.S.
- Died: February 9, 2025 (aged 92) Frederick, Maryland, U.S.
- Party: Democratic
- Spouse(s): Goodloe Byron (m. 1952; died 1978) B. Kirk Walsh (m. 1986; died 2019)
- Relations: William D. Byron (father-in-law); Katharine Byron (mother-in-law)
- Parent: Harry C. Butcher (father)
- Education: Hood College

Beverly Barton Byron (née Butcher; July 27, 1932 – February 9, 2025) was an American politician and member of the Democratic Party who served as a U.S. representative representing the 6th congressional district of Maryland from January 3, 1979, to January 3, 1993.

== Background ==
Beverly Barton Butcher was born in Baltimore, Maryland, on July 27, 1932, to Ruth (née Barton) and Harry C. Butcher, a CBS radio broadcaster and naval aide to General Dwight D. Eisenhower during World War II. During her childhood, her family lived in the Wardman Park Hotel, and her father's connections in Washington, D.C. enabled her to meet and befriend powerful figures such as President Franklin D. Roosevelt, Eleanor Roosevelt, and Dwight and Mamie Eisenhower. Her godfather was political operative George E. Allen.

== Career ==
Butcher graduated from the National Cathedral School for Girls in Washington in 1950, and later earned a two-year degree from Hood College in Frederick, Maryland, in 1962. In 1952, she married Goodloe Byron. She became involved in several nonprofit groups and in fundraising for the Democratic Party. She was first elected to Congress in 1978, succeeding her husband, Goodloe Byron, who died of a heart attack a month before the election. Recalling her husband's sudden death and her subsequent elevation to office, she later reflected, "Within 24 hours I was a widow, a single parent, unemployed and a candidate for Congress". Though it was initially assumed that she would only serve a single term, she remained in Congress for a total of fourteen years, re-elected six times and serving until 1993.

In Congress, Byron particularly focused on military and national security issues. A conservative Democrat, she opposed abortion and supported the fiscal policies of the Reagan administration. She served on the House Armed Services Committee, the Interior and Insular Affairs Committee, and the Select Committee on Aging. She chaired the House Special Panel on Arms Control and Disarmament from 1983 to 1986, and backed the development of the MX Missile. In 1987, she became chairwoman of the Military Personnel and Compensation Subcommittee, beating out the decisively liberal Pat Schroeder, the preferred choice of Armed Services Committee chairman Les Aspin. She was the first woman to chair an Armed Services subcommittee, and the first woman ever to fly aboard the SR-71 Blackbird of the USAF (checkout #429), on which she flew as a VIP in November 1985.

Byron was defeated in the 1992 Democratic primary by a somewhat more liberal challenger, State Delegate Thomas Hattery, who in turn lost to Republican nominee Roscoe Bartlett in the general election. After leaving Congress, she served as a commissioner on the 1993 Base Realignment and Closure Commission. In 1995, President Bill Clinton appointed her to the United States Naval Academy Board of Visitors and she was also a member of the Board of Regents for the Potomac Institute for Policy Studies.

== Personal life and death ==
Beverly and Goodloe Byron had three children. In 1986, she married B. Kirk Walsh, who had worked as an official in the United States Department of Housing and Urban Development; he died in 2019. Byron died from heart failure at her home in Frederick, Maryland, on February 9, 2025, at the age of 92.

== See also ==
- Women in the United States House of Representatives

U.S. House of Representatives
Preceded by Goodloe Byron	Member of the U.S. House of Representatives from Maryland's 6th congressional district 1979–1993	Succeeded by Roscoe Bartlett
