= Urner =

Urner is a surname. Notable people with the surname include:

- Catherine Murphy Urner (1891–1942), American composer
- Joseph Urner (1898–1987), American sculptor, painter, and etcher
- Milton Urner (1839–1926), American politician

== See also ==
- Turner (surname)
