= McKaig =

McKaig is a surname. Notable people with the surname include:

- Cecil McKaig (1885–1939), British cyclist
- Rae McKaig (1922–1996), British Royal Navy admiral
- William McMahon McKaig (1845–1907), American politician

== See also ==
- McKaig-Hatch, a defunct American tool manufacturing company
