= Senator Byron =

Senator Byron may refer to:

- Goodloe Byron (1929–1978), Maryland State Senate
- William D. Byron (1895–1941), Maryland State Senate
