= Katharine Byron =

American politician (1903–1976)

Katharine Edgar Byron
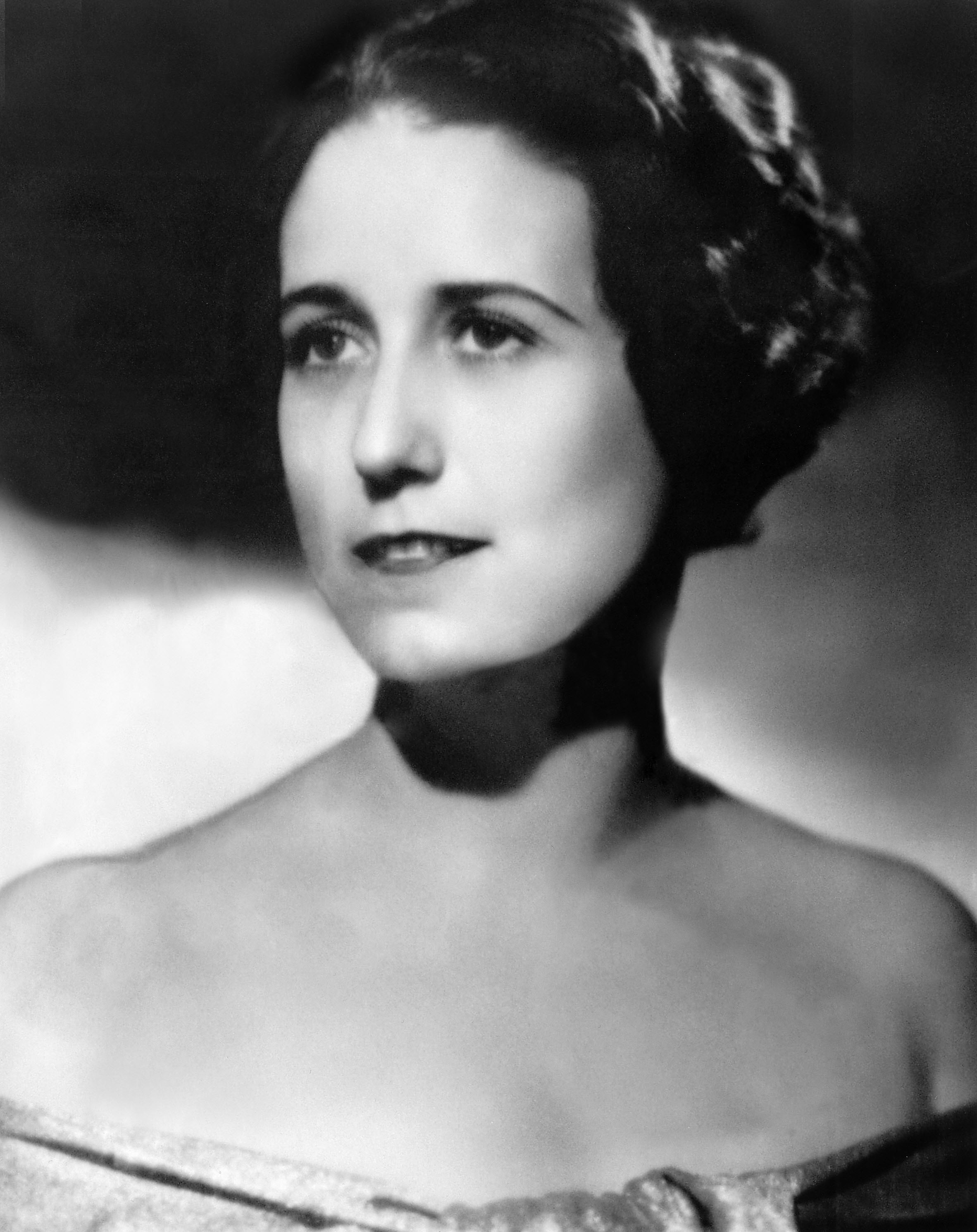

Member of the U.S. House of Representatives from Maryland's 6th district
- In office May 27, 1941 – January 3, 1943
- Preceded by: William D. Byron
- Succeeded by: James Glenn Beall

Personal details
- Born: Katharine Edgar; October 25, 1903 Detroit, Michigan, U.S.
- Died: December 28, 1976 (aged 73) Washington, D.C., U.S.
- Resting place: Riverview Cemetery; Williamsport, Maryland, U.S.
- Party: Democratic
- Spouses: William D. Byron (m. 1922; died 1941) Samuel Bynum Riddick (m. 1947)
- Children: 5, including Goodloe Byron
- Relatives: Louis E. McComas (grandfather)

Katharine Byron (née Edgar; October 25, 1903 – December 28, 1976), a Democrat, was a U.S. Congresswoman who represented the 6th congressional district of Maryland from May 27, 1941, to January 3, 1943. She was the first woman elected to Congress from Maryland.

== Early life ==
Katharine Edgar was born in Detroit, Michigan, on October 25, 1902, to Mary (née McComas) and Brigadier General Clinton Goodloe Edgar. She attended independent schools during her youth, such as the Liggett School in Detroit, the Westover School of Middlebury, Connecticut, and the Holton-Arms School of Bethesda, Maryland. She later moved to Williamsport, Maryland, in 1922. The Byrons were communicants of Saint John's Church.

She was a granddaughter of U.S. Senator Louis E. McComas, who represented the 6th congressional district of Maryland.

== Personal life ==
She married William D. Byron in 1922. Together, they had five sons:

- William Devereux Byron III (1925–1990)
- James “Jamie” Edgar Byron (1927-2011)
- Goodloe Edgar Byron (1929–1978) – a representative from the 6th district.
- David Wilson Byron (1932–1964)
- Louis McComas Byron (1938–2011)

She married Samuel Bynum Riddick in 1947.

== Career ==
She was elected to Congress in a special election held May 27, 1941 to replace her husband, Representative William D. Byron, after his death in an airplane crash near Atlanta, Georgia on February 27, 1941.

She advocated amending the Neutrality Act during World War II and gave one of five speeches on December 8, 1941, in favor of President Franklin Roosevelt's declaration of war on Japan.

She did not seek re-election in 1942 and retired in Washington, D.C.

== Death ==
Byron died at Georgetown University Hospital on December 28, 1976. She is interred in Riverview Cemetery in Williamsport, Maryland.

== See also ==
- Women in the United States House of Representatives

U.S. House of Representatives
Preceded by William D. Byron	Member of the U.S. House of Representatives from Maryland's 6th congressional district 1941–1943	Succeeded by James Glenn Beall
