= Martin V. Montgomery =

American judge

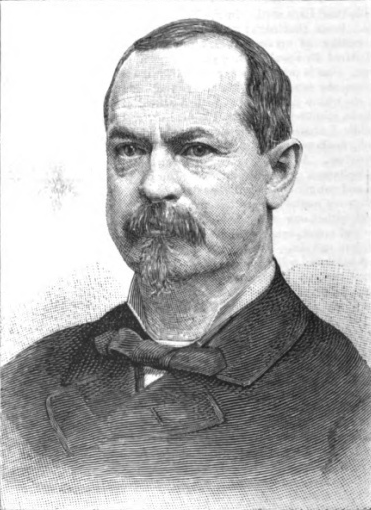

Associate Justice of the Supreme Court of the District of Columbia
- In office April 1, 1887 – October 2, 1892
- Appointed by: Grover Cleveland
- Preceded by: Arthur MacArthur Sr.
- Succeeded by: Louis E. McComas

Member of the Michigan House of Representatives
- In office 1871

Personal details
- Born: Martin Van Buren Montgomery; October 20, 1840 Eaton Rapids, Michigan
- Died: November 12, 1898 (aged 58) Lansing, Michigan
- Education: read law

Martin Van Buren Montgomery (October 20, 1840 – November 12, 1898) was an associate justice of the Supreme Court of the District of Columbia.

== Education and career ==
Born on October 20, 1840, in Eaton Rapids, Michigan, Montgomery read law in 1865. He served in B Company, Second Michigan Cavalry of the Union Army in the American Civil War from 1861 to 1862 and became a sergeant. He entered private practice in Eaton Rapids from 1865 to 1871. He was a member of the Michigan House of Representatives in 1871. He resumed private practice in Jackson, Michigan from 1871 to 1873, then returned to Eaton Rapids from 1873 to 1875. He continued private practice in Lansing, Michigan from 1875 to 1885. He served as Commissioner of the United States Patent Office (now the United States Patent and Trademark Office) from 1885 to 1887.

== Federal judicial service ==
Montgomery received a recess appointment from President Grover Cleveland on April 1, 1887, to an Associate Justice seat on the Supreme Court of the District of Columbia (now the United States District Court for the District of Columbia) vacated by Judge Arthur MacArthur Sr. He was nominated to the same position by President Cleveland on December 20, 1887. He was confirmed by the United States Senate on January 26, 1888, and received his commission the same day. His service terminated on October 2, 1892, due to his resignation.

== Later career and death ==
Following his resignation from the federal bench, Montgomery resumed private practice in Lansing from 1892 to 1895. He died on November 12, 1898, in Lansing and is buried at Mount Hope Cemetery, Lansing, Michigan.

== Sources ==
Legal offices
Preceded by Arthur MacArthur Sr.	Associate Justice of the Supreme Court of the District of Columbia; 1887–1892	Succeeded by Louis E. McComas
