= Mayor of Cumberland, Maryland =

Mayor of the City of Cumberland
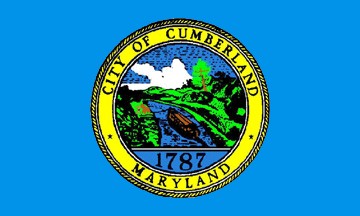
- Flag of Cumberland

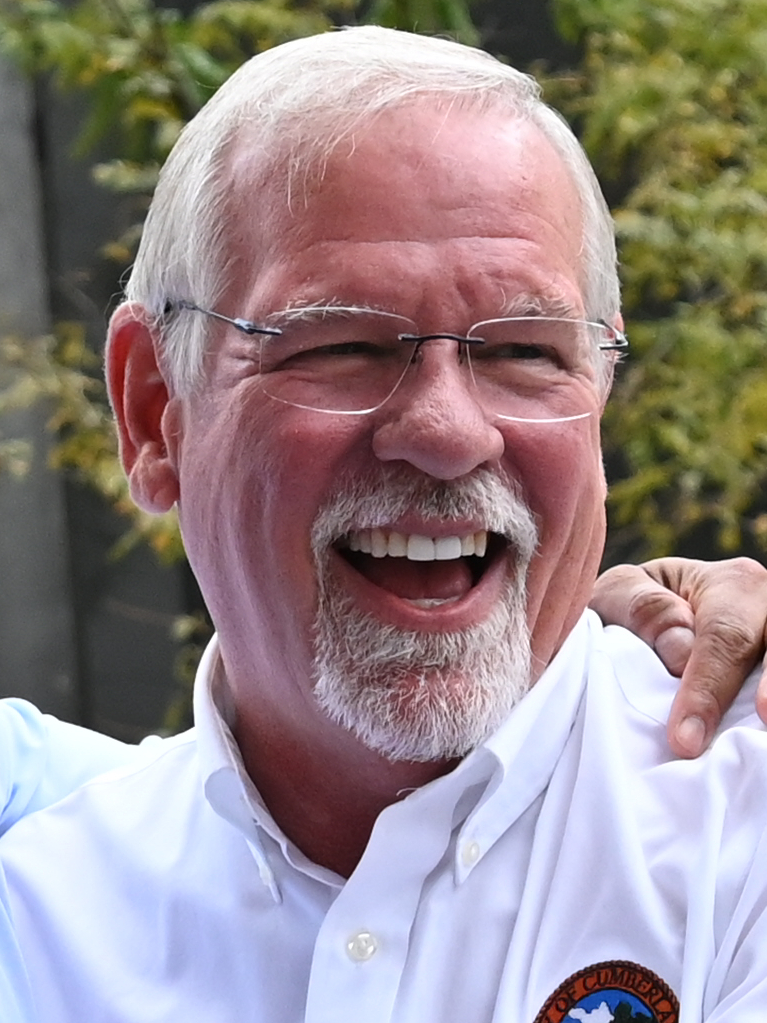
- Incumbent; Raymond M. Morriss since January 1, 2019
- Term length: Four years
- Inaugural holder: John Scott
- Formation: January 23, 1815; 211 years ago
- Salary: $7,200
- Website: www.cumberlandmd.gov

The mayor of Cumberland, Maryland is the chief executive of the government of Cumberland, as stipulated by the city charter.

== List of mayors ==
Mayors of Cumberland, Maryland (1816–present):

- 1816–1823: John Scott
- 1823–1824: Samuel Magill, established the first newspaper in Cumberland, the Allegany Freeman, published weekly from 1813 to 1816
- 1824–1835: Roger Perry
- 1835–1836: John Gephart
- 1836–1837: John Wright
- 1837–1838: Gustavus Beall
- 1838–1839: Frederick Deems
- 1839–1841: Samuel Charles
- 1841–1842: James Smith
- 1842–1843: John Gephart
- 1843–1849: Thomas Shriver
- 1849–1850: Thomas F. White
- 1850–1851: Thomas Shriver
- 1851–1852: Daniel Saylor
- 1852–1853: John Hayes
- 1853–1854: Fayette Bartholomew Tower
- 1854–1855: A. L. Withers
- 1855–1856: William Wallace McKaig
- 1856–1857: Joseph H. Tucker
- 1857–1858: James W. Jones
- 1858–1860: D. W. McCleary
- 1860–1861: John Humbird
- 1861–1862: Charles Mynn Thruston
- 1862–1863: Charles H. Ohr
- 1863–1864: James Smith
- 1864–1865: Charles H. Ohr
- 1865–1866: George Harrison
- 1866–1869: John Humbird
- 1869–1871: Lloyd Lowe
- 1871–1872: William Piatt
- 1872–1873: John B. Widener
- 1873–1874: William A. Withers
- 1874–1874: William R. McCulley
- 1874–1876: John Humbird
- 1876–1877: William A. Withers
- 1890–1890: William McMahon McKaig
- 1891–1891: David J. Blackiston
- 1900–1904: Warren C. White
- 1904–1905: Clarence M. King
- 1905–1906: William A. Cromwell
- 1906–1908: Clarence M. King
- 1908–1910: George A. Kean
- 1910–1914: George A. Young
- 1914–1932: Thomas W. Koon
- 1932–1934: George Henderson
- 1934–1936: George W. Legge
- 1936–1939: Thomas W. Koon
- 1939–1942: Harry Irvine
- 1942–1944: Thomas F. Conlon
- 1944–1952: Thomas S. Post
- 1952–1958: Roy W. Eves
- 1958–1962: J. Edwin Keech
- 1962–1966: Earl D. Chaney
- 1966–1974: Thomas F. Conlon Jr.
- 1974–1978: F. Perry Smith, Jr.
- 1978–1982: Frank K. Nethken
- 1982–1988: George M. Wyckoff Jr.
- 1988–1992: Harry Stern
- 1992–2000: Edward C. Athey
- 2000–2011: Lee N. Fiedler
- 2011–2019: Brian K. Grim
- 2019–present: Raymond Morriss
