= Alabama State Monument =

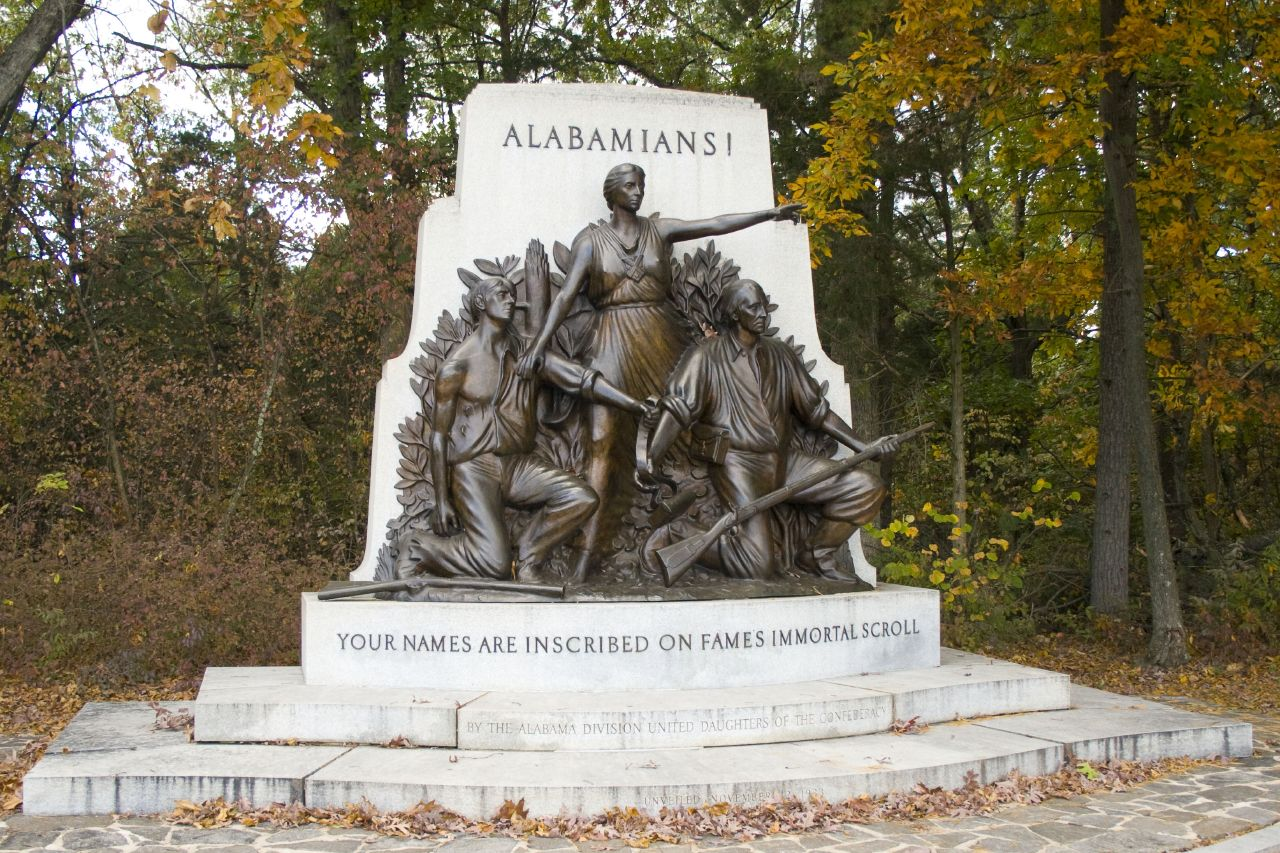
- Interactive map of Alabama State Monument
- Location: Warfield Ridge, Gettysburg National Military Park
- Coordinates: 39°47′11″N 77°15′15″W
- Designer: Joseph M. Urner
- Material: Bronze
- Dedicated date: November 12, 1933

The Alabama State Monument, also known as the Alabama State Memorial, is a monument which is located in the Gettysburg National Military Park. It memorializes the Confederate units from Alabama that took part in the Battle of Gettysburg.

== History and descriptive details ==
This monument is located in an area of the national park that was occupied by Evander M. Law's Alabama Brigade prior to their attack on the Round Tops on July 2, 1863. It was dedicated by the Alabama Division of the United Daughters of the Confederacy on November 12, 1933.

The memorial was created by Joseph Urner. It features a large granite base topped by a granite monolith, fronted by a bronze figure group. The granite was quarried from Gettysburg and Vermont, with the bronze cast at the Hammaker Brothers Foundry. The bronze group composition features a female figure representing the Spirit of the Confederacy, flanked by a wounded soldier on her right and an armed soldier on her left. Her left arm gestures the armed soldier to continue fighting and her right lightly restrains the wounded figure from further combat. The top of the granite monolith is inscribed with the word "Alabamians!" and the base with "Your Names Are Inscribed On Fames Immortal Scroll."

== See also ==
- List of monuments of the Gettysburg Battlefield
