= Joseph Urner =

American painter

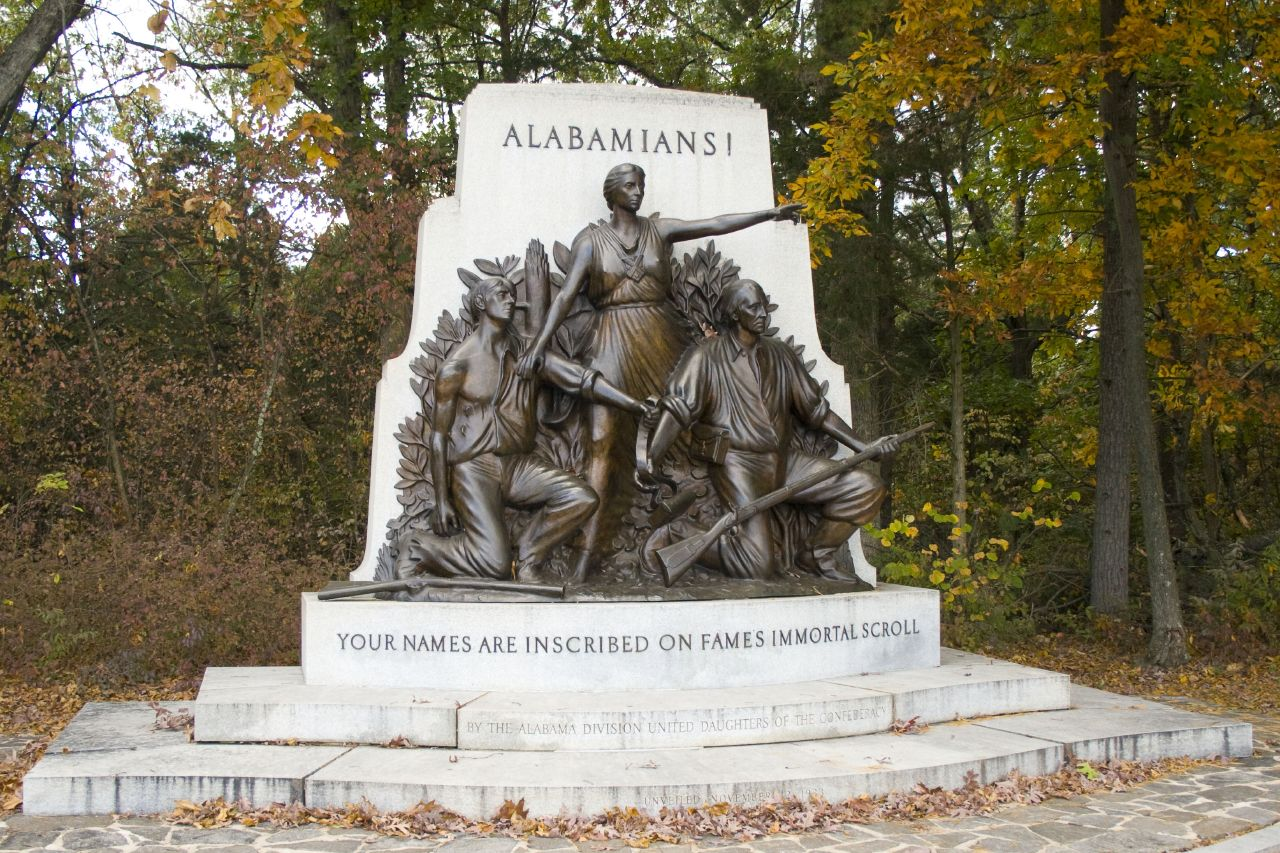
Alabama Monument

Joseph Walker Urner (January 16, 1898 – 1987) American sculptor, painter and etcher born in Frederick, Maryland. He was the son of the Hon. Hammond G. Urner (1868–1942) and Mary Lavinia "Birdie" Floyd (1872–1956). His paternal grandfather was Milton Urner (July 29, 1839 – February 9, 1926), a U.S. Congressman from the sixth district of Maryland who served two terms from 1879 until 1883.

He studied sculpture with Ettore Cadorin. Joseph served in both World War I and World War II. He was an architect and practiced sculpture as well. He died in 1987. He created the Alabama State Memorial at Gettysburg, PA.

== Selected works ==
- Alabama State Monument, Gettysburg, Pennsylvania
- Frederick, Maryland
