= Fayette Bartholomew Tower =

American politician (1817–1857)

Fayette Bartholomew Tower (June 29, 1817 – February 16, 1857) was an American civil engineer and mayor.

Tower was born in Waterville, New York, on June 29, 1817. Tower was educated as a civil engineer. In 1837, he was appointed to the engineering staff of the Croton Aqueduct and continued on that work until its completion in 1842. During the ensuing five years, he made Waterville his residence, and at the time prepared his "Illustration of the Croton Aqueduct", consisting of a series of 21 plates with text (New York, 1843). About 1848, his health led him to seek a milder climate, and he settled in Cumberland, Maryland. He was chosen to the Maryland legislature and was later elected mayor of Cumberland (1853–1854). His health continued to fall, and in 1856 he returned to Waterville and died soon afterwards on February 16, 1857.

The Museum of the City of New York has a collection of his papers.

Preceded by John Hayes	Mayor of Cumberland; 1853-1854	Succeeded by A. L. Withers
