= John Scott (mayor) =

John Scott was the first mayor of Cumberland, Maryland from 1816 to 1823.

The town of Cumberland, Maryland was incorporated in January 1815, at which time the legislature passed an act to hold elections for 5 city commissioners to oversee regulation and improvement of the newly incorporated town. These Commissioners were ordered at the first election to choose one of their own number as Chief Burgess. On Monday June, 1816, the first elections in the town was held for Commissioners, and the following persons were chosen: David Shriver, George Thistle, Henry McKinley, John Hoyne, and John Scott. These commissioners met at once, and elected from their own number John Scott to be Chief Burgess.

Preceded by None	Mayor of Cumberland; 1816-1823	Succeeded by Samuel Magill
