= Thomas F. Conlon Jr. =

American politician and businessman (1924–2017)

54th Mayor of Cumberland, Maryland
- In office 1966–1974
- Preceded by: Earl D. Chaney
- Succeeded by: F. Perry Smith Jr.

Member of the Maryland House of Delegates
- In office 1959–1962

Personal details
- Born: Thomas Frederick Conlon Jr. October 10, 1924 Cumberland, Maryland, U.S.
- Died: December 8, 2017 (aged 93)
- Party: Democratic
- Spouse: Gertrude Dooley
- Children: 5
- Parent: Thomas F. Conlon (father)
- Education: LaSalle High School
- Occupation: Politician, business owner, conservationist

Military service
- Allegiance: United States
- Branch/service: United States Army
- Years of service: 1943–1946
- Rank: Captain

Thomas Frederick Conlon Jr. (October 10, 1924 – December 8, 2017) was an American politician and businessman who served as the 54th mayor of Cumberland, Maryland, from 1966 to 1974 as a member of the Democratic Party. He previously served in the Maryland House of Delegates from 1959 to 1962.

== Early life and education ==
Conlon was born in Cumberland, Maryland, on October 10, 1924, as the oldest of three children of Thomas F. Conlon and Elizabeth (Knieriem) Conlon. Thomas F. Conlon Sr. served as the 49th mayor of Cumberland from 1942 to 1944.

Conlon attended parochial schools in Cumberland and graduated from LaSalle High School in 1942.

== Career ==
Following high school, Conlon enlisted in the United States Army, serving from 1943 to 1946. After leaving active duty, he joined the United States Army Reserve, retiring with the rank of captain.

After his military service, Conlon returned to Cumberland and began working in the family business, selling life insurance and later opening a travel agency.

Conlon was a delegate to the Democratic State Convention in 1954. He represented Allegany County in the Maryland House of Delegates from 1959 to 1962.

Conlon served two terms as the 54th mayor of Cumberland, holding office from 1966 to 1974. According to one of his children, Conlon wanted to preserve the Queen City Station, though it was ultimately demolished. Conlon was preceded in office by Earl D. Chaney and succeeded by F. Perry Smith Jr.

== Personal life and death ==
In 1953, Conlon married Gertrude Dooley in Cumberland; the couple had five children.

Conlon was a member of several organizations during his life, including the National Railroad Historical Association, the National Preservation Society, the Cumberland Chamber of Commerce, the American Society of Travel Agents, the Cumberland Historic Cemetery Organization, the Knights of Columbus, the Military Affiliate Radio System, the Maryland Independent Insurance Agents Association, and the Society of the Holy Name.

Conlon was a Roman Catholic.

Conlon died at the age of 93 on December 8, 2017. Per Conlon's wishes, his body was donated to the Maryland Anatomy Board for medical research with the hopes of forwarding studies toward treatment and a cure for essential tremor.

Maryland House of Delegates
Preceded by —	Member of the Maryland House of Delegates; 1959–1962	Succeeded by —
Political offices
Preceded by Earl D. Chaney	Mayor of Cumberland, Maryland; 1966–1974	Succeeded by F. Perry Smith Jr.
