= George M. Wyckoff Jr. =

American steel company executive

George Magee Wyckoff Jr. (December 28, 1928 – January 10, 2003) was an American steel company executive and owner. He served as the 57th mayor of Cumberland, Maryland, from 1982 to 1988.

== Early life ==
Wyckoff was born in Buffalo, New York, and attended Hotchkiss School and Yale University. He married Lucy Benedict Williams, who died in 1996. They had a son and two daughters. Wyckoff's parents were Wyckoff Steel executive, George M. senior, and Marjorie Annable. He had two sisters, Marjorie and Florence.

== Career ==
Wyckoff began his career working for worked for his great-uncle's company, Wyckoff Steel Company, running the company's Pittsburgh, Cleveland, and Chicago offices. Wyckoff Steel was sold in 1964, and in 1967 he bought the Cumberland Steel Company, a company that produced precision shafts for the machine tool industry, and moved to Cumberland, Maryland. Wyckoff grew the small company into a $6 million a year business. He sold the company's Cumberland plant 1987; the company's larger plant was in the Chicago area.

Wyckoff was a member of the Municipal Planning and Zoning Commission in Cumberland in the early 1970s. He was Vice President of the local chapter of the American Cancer Society in 1973–74.

He served as Mayor of Cumberland from 1982 to 1990. One of his major achievements as Mayor was persuading West Virginia to require that Ridgeley, West Virginia, just upstream from Cumberland, stop dumping raw sewage into the Potomac River. He was remembered for his work to fluoridate water during his tenure as mayor.

Wyckoff served on the board of Cumberland Memorial Hospital and First National Bank of Maryland and as president of the Allegheny County Chamber of Congress.

Preceded by Frank K. Nethken	Mayor of Cumberland; 1982-1988	Succeeded by Harry Stern
