= South Prospect Street Historic District =

Historic district in Maryland, United States

- U.S. National Register of Historic Places
- U.S. Historic district
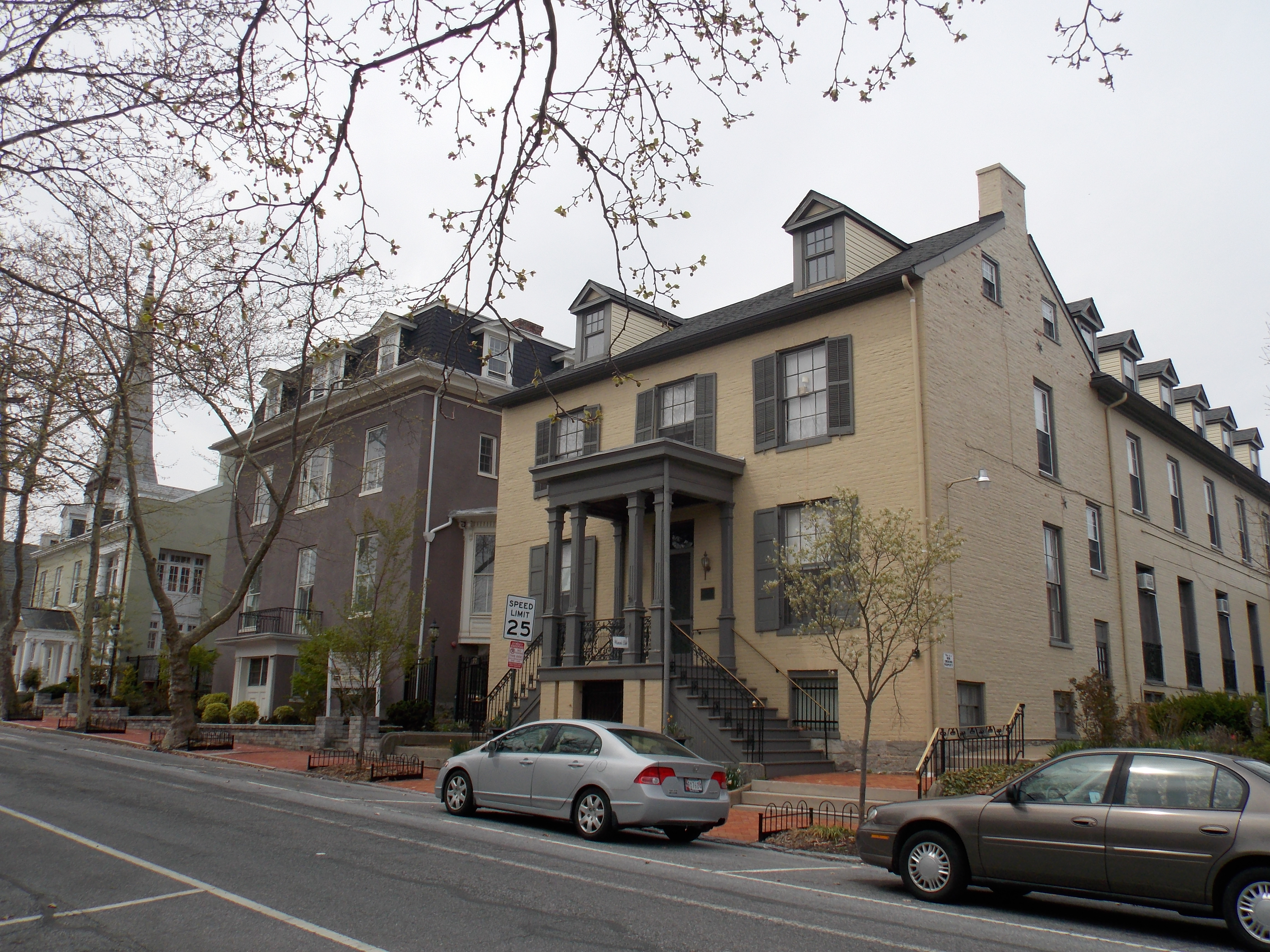

- Location within Maryland Location within the United States
- Location: 18-278 S. Prospect St., Hagerstown, Maryland
- Coordinates: 39°38′29″N 77°43′35″W
- Area: 24 acres (9.7 ha)
- Architectural style: Second Empire, Italianate, Queen Anne
- NRHP reference No.: 79003261
- Added to NRHP: October 1, 1979

South Prospect Street Historic District is a national historic district at Hagerstown, Washington County, Maryland, United States. The district is a 19th and early 20th century residential neighborhood which was once the address of many of Hagerstown's leading citizens. The street is lined with more than 50 structures representing America's varied and strong architectural heritage and includes both domestic and ecclesiastical buildings, such as Saint John's Church and the Presbyterian Church. The architectural styles represented range from the Neoclassical of the early 19th century to the classical revivals of the early 20th century.

It was added to the National Register of Historic Places in 1979.
