= Samuel Magill =

Samuel Magill was the second mayor of Cumberland, Maryland from 1823 to 1824.

In 1812, Magill established one of the first newspapers in Cumberland, the Allegany Freeman, whose editorial stance supported Democratic politics. The Freeman featured news about the War of 1812, national political coverage, and advertisements.

Preceded by John Scott	Mayor of Cumberland; 1823-1824	Succeeded by Roger Perry
