= Upton Sheredine =

American politician

Member of the U.S. House of Representatives from Maryland's 6th district
- In office March 4, 1791 – March 3, 1793
- Preceded by: Daniel Carroll
- Succeeded by: Gabriel Christie

Personal details
- Born: 1740
- Died: January 14, 1800 (aged 59–60) Frederick County, Maryland, U.S.
- Party: Anti-Administration

Upton Sheredine (c. 1740 – January 14, 1800) was an American jurist and statesman from Baltimore, Maryland. He represented Maryland at both the state and national level, and was a judge in several courts.

Sheredine moved to a farm near a place known as Liberty in Frederick County, Maryland, in 1754 with his family. He served as a delegate during the State constitutional convention in 1776, and one year later became a member of the Maryland House of Delegates. He also served in the Maryland State Senate from 1776 to 1781. Sheredine served as a judge in several courts in Maryland. He was judge of the Frederick County, Maryland court of appeals in 1777, a member of the special court which tried, convicted, and sentenced Tories on July 25, 1781, was judge of the orphans court of Frederick County, and an associate judge of the fifth judicial district in 1791.

From 1791 to 1793, Sheredine represented the sixth district of Maryland in the Second Congress of the United States. He is generally considered to have been part of the anti-Administration faction in congress. In 1798, he was appointed commissioner of the fourth division of Maryland for the valuation of land and houses and the enumeration of slaves. He died on his estate, Midhill, near Liberty, Maryland, and is interred in a private cemetery on his estate.

U.S. House of Representatives
Preceded by Daniel Carroll	U.S. Congressman from the 6th district of Maryland; 1791–1793	Succeeded by Gabriel Christie
