= William Matthews (politician) =

American politician

Member of the U.S. House of Representatives from Maryland's 6th district
- In office March 4, 1797 – March 3, 1799
- Preceded by: Gabriel Christie
- Succeeded by: Gabriel Christie

Member of the Maryland House of Delegates
- In office 1786–1789

Personal details
- Born: April 26, 1755 Cecil County, Maryland, U.S.
- Died: c. 1808 (aged 52–53)
- Party: Federalist

William Matthews (April 26, 1755 – c. 1808) was an American politician. He was born in Cecil County, Maryland, and was a judge of the Cecil County Court in 1778, 1780, and 1782–1786. He was a member of the Maryland House of Delegates from 1786 to 1789.

He was later elected from the sixth district of Maryland as a Federalist to the Fifth Congress, serving from March 4, 1797, to March 3, 1799. In this position he was both preceded and succeeded by the Democratic-Republican Gabriel Christie. He also previously ran against Christie in 1792. He is interred in his family's graveyard in Cecil County.

U.S. House of Representatives
Preceded by Gabriel Christie	Representative of the 6th Congressional District of Maryland; 1797–1799	Succeeded by Gabriel Christie
