= Charles W. Hoffman =

Founder of the Georgetown University Law Center

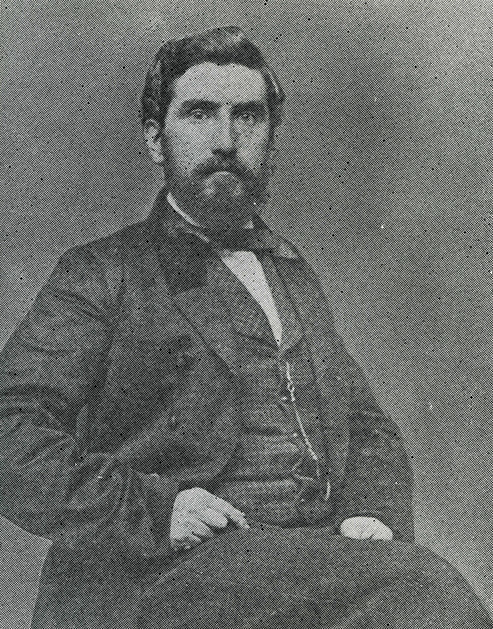

1st Dean of Georgetown University Law Center
- In office 1877–1891
- Succeeded by: Martin Morris

2nd Law Librarian of Congress
- In office 1873–1886
- Preceded by: Charles Henry Wharton Meehan
- Succeeded by: George F. Curtis

Personal details
- Born: 1829
- Died: 1896 (aged 66–67) Frederick, Maryland

Charles W. Hoffman (1829 - 1896) was a founder of the Georgetown University Law Center and its first dean. Hoffman also served as the second Law Librarian of Congress.

== Dean of Georgetown Law ==
Hoffman is widely viewed as one of the three primary founders of Georgetown's law school alongside Hubley Ashton and Charles James in 1870. A lawyer by trade, Hoffman served as the school's first secretary and treasurer in its early years of operation, and oversaw rapid growth of its initial classes. He also played a role in recruiting sitting Supreme Court Justice Samuel Miller to serve as the school's sole salaried professor in 1873, and he helped found the school's Moot Court in 1875.

In 1877, Georgetown University President Patrick Healy established the Office of the Dean and asked Hoffman to serve in the role. Hoffman accepted and served as the school's first dean until 1891, when he was replaced by long-serving faculty member Martin Morris.

Hoffman also served as a professor of various subjects at Georgetown College both before and after the Civil War.

== Law Librarian of Congress ==
Hoffman served for thirteen years as the Law Librarian of Congress, much of it while he was Dean of Georgetown Law. He became the second person appointed to the Law Librarian position when he was selected in 1873 by Ainsworth Spofford, the Librarian of Congress.

Hoffman's tenure was marked by the growth and professionalization of the Law Library, which was a small space still located inside the U.S. Capitol Building at the end of the nineteenth century. The role of Law Librarian was granted floor privileges by the U.S. House of Representatives in 1880 and by the U.S. Senate in 1884.

Hoffman served as Law Librarian until 1886, when he resigned from the role. The Washington Post reported that his resignation was due to “mental trouble” suffered after the loss of his mother.

== Personal life ==
Hoffman never married and lived for many years on Capitol Hill. According to his obituary, he collected antique furniture and was known to host parties attended by prominent legal figures including Supreme Court Justice Stephen Field. Hoffman later lived with his mother at 927 Massachusetts Avenue in Washington, D.C.

Hoffman died of pneumonia in 1896 in Frederick, Maryland, where he had relatives. He left behind an estate of approximately $80,000, worth $3.1 million in 2025 dollars.
