= Harry C. Butcher =

Principal wartime aide to General Dwight D. Eisenhower

Harry Cecil Butcher
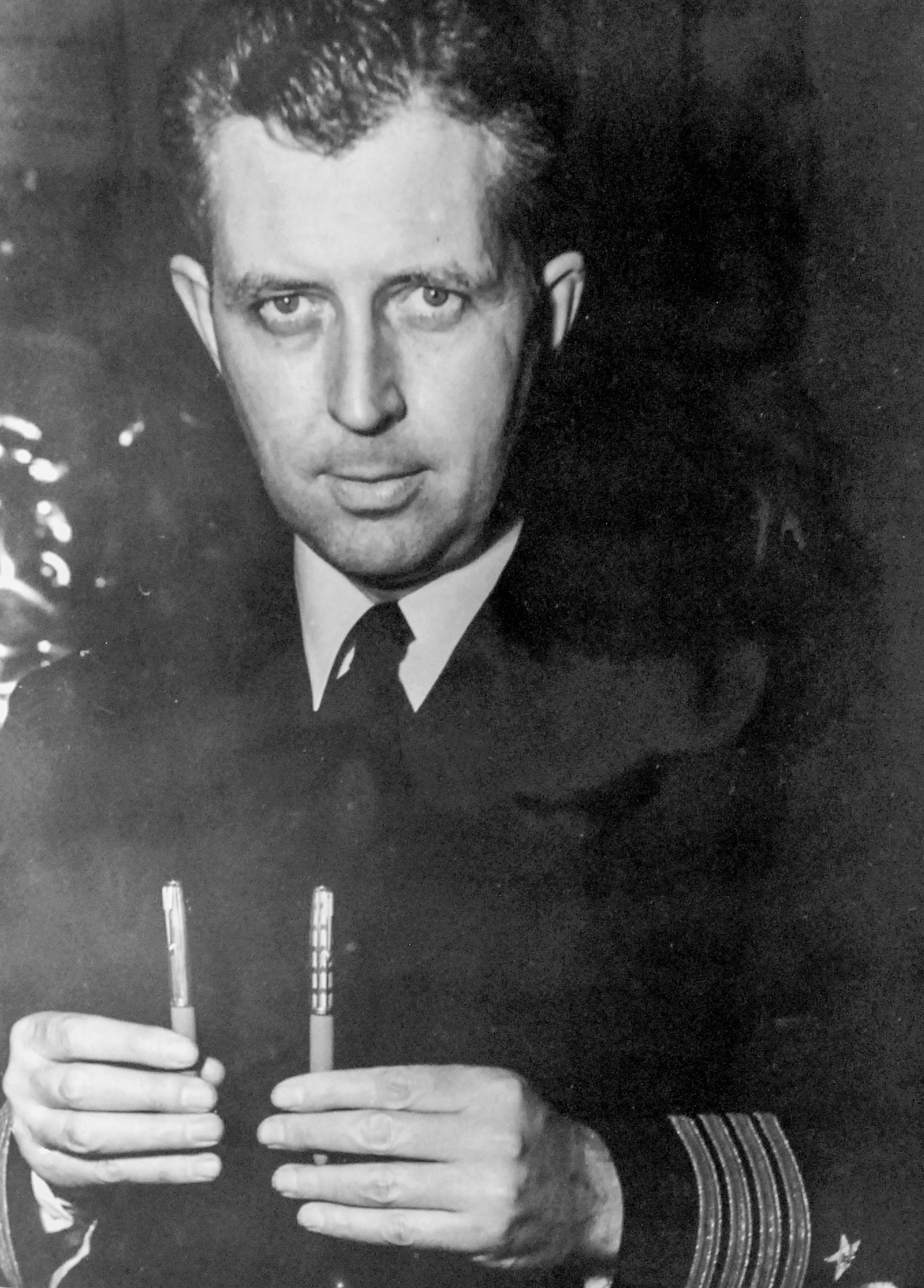
- Butcher holds pens with which German “Unconditional Surrender” document was signed in 1945.
- Born: November 1, 1901; Springville, Iowa, United States
- Died: April 20, 1985 (aged 83); Santa Barbara, California, United States
- Military career
- Allegiance: United States
- Branch: United States Navy Reserve
- Service years: 1939–1945
- Rank: Captain
- Conflicts: World War II
- Other work: Broadcaster; Radio & television consultant

Harry Cecil Butcher (November 1, 1901 – April 20, 1985) was an American radio broadcaster who served during World War II as a naval aide to General Dwight D. Eisenhower from 1942 to 1945.

== Early life ==
Butcher was born in Springville, Iowa, on November 1, 1901.

Following his graduation from Iowa State College, in 1929 Butcher began a career in radio broadcasting. He opened the Washington, D.C. office of CBS and served as its director until 1932. Beginning in 1932, he was the manager, and later vice-president, of the CBS Radio Network's station in Washington, D.C. station WJSV. While there, Butcher coined a term for President Franklin Roosevelt's radio speeches to the American public, used by Robert Trout introducing the president's address on March 12, 1933, and again by Butcher written in a press release, referring to the May 7, 1933, address as a "fireside chat".

== Military career ==
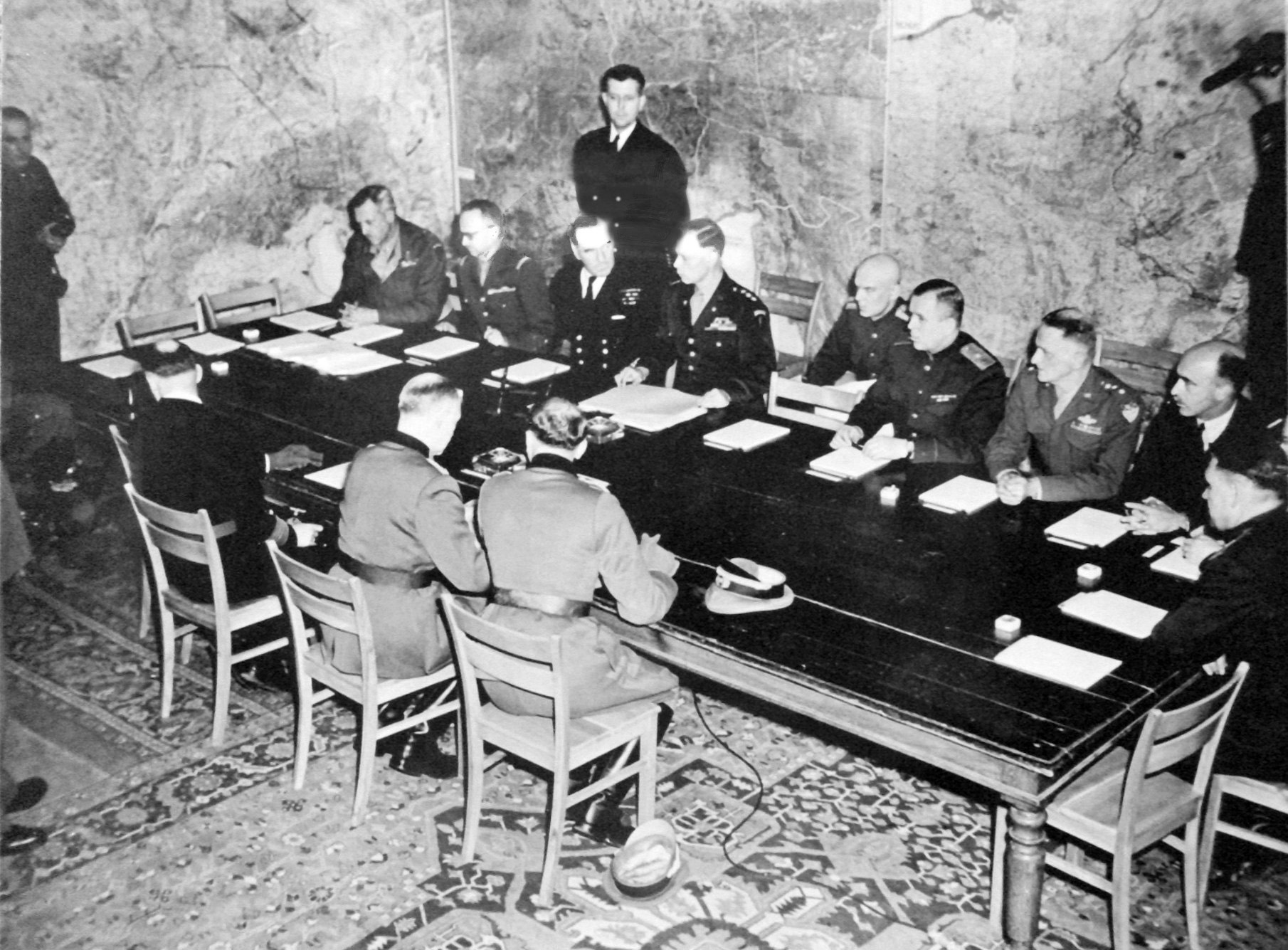
Signature of surrender on 7 May 1945 at Reims, France, including Harry C. Butcher standing in the background

During his tenure at WJSV, Butcher was commissioned a lieutenant commander in the United States Navy Reserve (USNR) on September 16, 1939. From 1942 to 1945, Butcher served as a naval aide to General Dwight D. Eisenhower. On May 1, 1943, Butcher was promoted to the rank of commander in the USNR. On November 1, 1944 he was promoted to the temporary rank of captain. Following an order given to him by Eisenhower, Butcher kept a diary of his and Eisenhower's wartime activities. The diary was published in 1946 under the title My Three Years with Eisenhower. Time found it to be "good-natured, modest, knowledgeable reporting. It makes few judgments and adds only anecdotes—not insights—to the U.S. knowledge of Eisenhower." It also led to historian Max Hastings referring to him as "the embodiment of all gossip-ridden staff officers". It was Butcher who preserved the written statement that Eisenhower had prepared in the event that the D-Day invasions failed.

== Later life ==
Butcher returned to the broadcasting world following the end of World War II. From 1946 to the 1970s, Butcher owned the radio station KIST in Santa Barbara, California. He also served as president of Santa Barbara's cable TV corporation and as a radio/television consultant.

== Personal life ==
Butcher was the father of Beverly Byron (1932–2025), a U.S. congresswoman.

On April 20, 1985, Butcher died in Santa Barbara, California, United States.
