= Goodloe Byron =

American politician from Maryland, US (1929–1978)

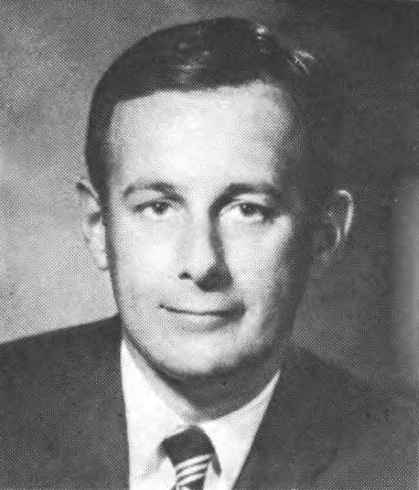

Member of the U.S. House of Representatives from Maryland's 6th district
- In office January 3, 1971 – October 11, 1978
- Preceded by: J. Glenn Beall Jr.
- Succeeded by: Beverly Byron

Member of the Maryland Senate from the 2nd district
- In office January 18, 1967 – January 3, 1971 Serving with Charles H. Smelser
- Preceded by: Constituency established
- Succeeded by: Edward P. Thomas

Member of the Maryland House of Delegates from the Frederick County district
- In office January 9, 1963 – January 11, 1967
- Preceded by: Multi-member district
- Succeeded by: Multi-member district

Personal details
- Born: Goodloe Edgar Byron; June 22, 1929 Williamsport, Maryland, U.S.
- Died: October 11, 1978 (aged 49) Hagerstown, Maryland, U.S.
- Resting place: Antietam National Cemetery
- Party: Democratic
- Spouse: Beverly Byron (m. 1952)
- Relations: Louis E. McComas (great-grandfather)
- Parent(s): William D. Byron; Katharine Byron
- Education: University of Virginia (BA); George Washington University (JD)

Military service
- Allegiance: United States
- Branch/service: United States Army
- Rank: Captain
- Unit: J.A.G. Corps; Maryland National Guard

Goodloe Edgar Byron (June 22, 1929 – October 11, 1978) was an American Democratic politician who was the member of the United States House of Representatives for Maryland's 6th congressional district from 1971 until his death. He was succeeded by his widow, Beverly Byron.

== Career ==
Byron attended The JAG School at the University of Virginia and entered U.S. Army JAG Corps. He served as a member of the United States Army Judge Advocate General's Corps from 1953 to 1957, honorably discharged with the rank of captain. He earned his JD from The George Washington University He later was elected to the Maryland House of Delegates (1963–1967) and the Maryland State Senate (1967–1971).

His parents, William D. Byron and Katharine Byron, both served as 6th district representative, from 1939 to 1941 and 1941 to 1943, respectively. The Byron family were communicants of Saint John's Church, Hagerstown.

== U.S. Congress ==
Byron first ran for Congress in 1968, though he lost to Republican incumbent J. Glenn Beall Jr. Beall did not seek re-election in 1970, and Byron was elected to the open seat. He was initially viewed as a highly conservative Democrat, particularly on environmental issues. Environmental Action placed him on their list of the "Dirty Dozen" members of Congress who they felt were particularly hostile towards their cause. This led to a challenge in the 1976 Democratic primary from Dan Rupli, who nearly defeated Byron. Thereafter, Byron moderated his environmental positions, supporting some conservationist measures, though he continued to be viewed as a conservative overall.

In Congress, he served on the House Armed Services Committee in his final term.

== Death ==
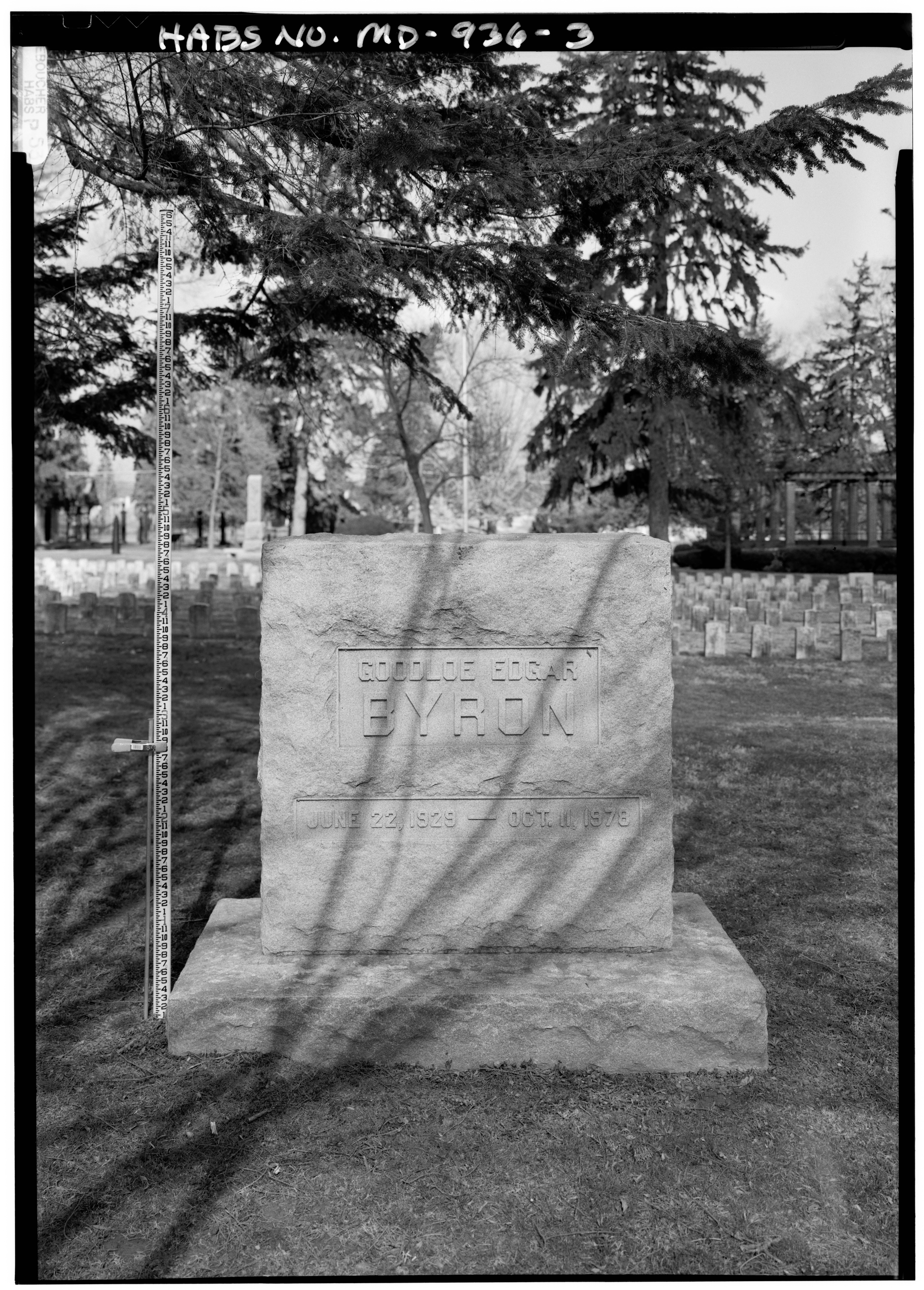
Monument of Byron at Antietam National Cemetery

On October 11, 1978, Byron suffered a fatal heart attack while he was jogging with an aide alongside the Chesapeake and Ohio Canal in western Maryland. He was pronounced dead at Washington County Hospital in Hagerstown, at the age of 49. Byron was buried in the Antietam National Cemetery in Sharpsburg, Maryland.

Byron was intrigued by the now widely discredited claim of Thomas J. Bassler, MD that nonsmokers able to complete a marathon in under four hours can eat whatever they wish and never suffer a fatal heart attack.

According to nutritionist and longevity research pioneer Nathan Pritikin, Byron had run six Boston Marathons, with a best time of 3:28:40, and had not smoked for 25 years. He ignored warnings from his physician who told him that treadmill tests from 1974 to 1978 indicated his coronary arteries were gradually closing. The last treadmill test in January 1978 "indicated severe abnormality and was positive for heart disease." The physician advised Byron to stop running until further tests could be done.

Dr. Manuel G. Jimenez, who did the autopsy, said Byron had "only pinprick openings" in his coronary arteries because they were filled with cholesterol. "Congressman Byron's coronary arteries were worse than most I've autopsied."

== See also ==
- List of members of the United States Congress who died in office (1950–1999)

U.S. House of Representatives
Preceded by John Glenn Beall Jr.	Member of the U.S. House of Representatives from Maryland's 6th congressional district 1971–1978	Succeeded by Beverly Byron
