= Martin Ferdinand Morris =

American judge

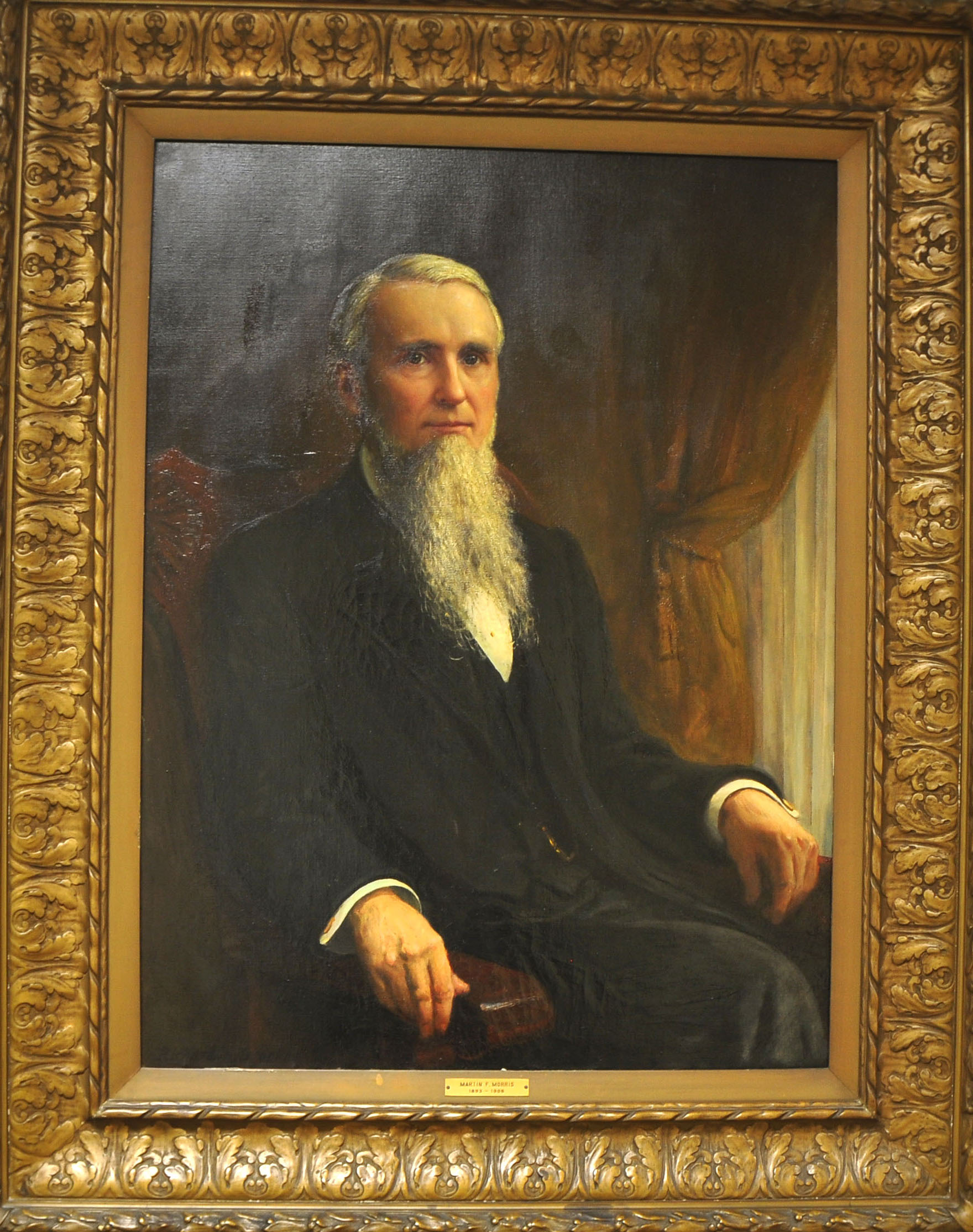

Associate Justice of the Court of Appeals of the District of Columbia
- In office April 15, 1893 – June 30, 1905
- Appointed by: Grover Cleveland
- Preceded by: Seat established by 27 Stat. 434
- Succeeded by: Louis E. McComas

Dean of Georgetown University Law Center
- In office 1891–1896
- Preceded by: Charles W. Hoffman
- Succeeded by: Jeremiah M. Wilson

Personal details
- Born: Martin Ferdinand Morris; December 3, 1834 Youghal, Ireland
- Died: September 12, 1909 (aged 74) Washington, D.C.
- Education: Georgetown University read law

Martin Ferdinand Morris (December 3, 1834 – September 12, 1909) was an Associate Justice of the Court of Appeals of the District of Columbia.

== Education and career ==
Born December 3, 1834, in Washington D.C., of Irish Catholic descent, Morris graduated from Georgetown University in 1854. On leaving Georgetown, Morris entered the Jesuit novitiate at Frederick, Maryland, to prepare himself for the Catholic priesthood. However, the death of his father left him the sole support of his mother and sisters and he thereafter pursued the study of law. He read law in 1863 and subsequently entered private practice in Baltimore, Maryland from 1864 to 1867. He continued private practice in Washington, D.C. from 1867 to 1893. He was, including concurrently with his later federal judicial service, a Professor at Georgetown Law from 1876 to 1909, serving as Dean of that institution from 1891 to 1896. Morris was one of the founders of Georgetown Law in 1870, alongside Charles W. Hoffman, Hubley Ashton, and Charles James.

== Federal judicial service ==
Morris was nominated by President Grover Cleveland on April 14, 1893, to the Court of Appeals of the District of Columbia (now the United States Court of Appeals for the District of Columbia Circuit), to a new Associate Justice seat authorized by 27 Stat. 434. He was confirmed by the United States Senate on April 15, 1893, and received his commission the same day. His service terminated on June 30, 1905, due to his retirement.

== Honor ==
Morris received the honorary degree Doctor of Laws (LL.D.) from Georgetown University in 1877.

== Publication ==
Morris wrote "Lectures on the History of the Development of Constitutional and Civil Liberty" in 1908.

== Death ==
Morris died on September 12, 1909, in Washington, D.C.

== Sources ==
Political offices
Preceded by Seat established by 27 Stat. 434	Associate Justice of the Court of Appeals of the District of Columbia; 1893–1905	Succeeded by Louis E. McComas
