= William A. Withers =

American politician (1835–1887)

William A. Withers (1835-1887) was twice the mayor of Cumberland, Maryland, in 1873–74 and 1876–77. In addition he served on the city council.

Early in his career William Withers ran a successful tanning business with his father, Addison Lewis Withers, Sr. (1804–1890). Later in life, he was in the hardware business. He died of tuberculosis on May 14, 1887.

Preceded by John B. Widener	Mayor of Cumberland; 1873–1874	Succeeded by William R. McCulley

Preceded by John Humbird	Mayor of Cumberland; 1876–1877	Succeeded by William McMahon McKaig
