= Gabriel Christie (Maryland politician) =

American politician

Member of the U.S. House of Representatives from Maryland's 6th district
- In office March 4, 1799 – March 3, 1801
- Preceded by: William Matthews
- Succeeded by: John Archer
- In office March 4, 1793 – March 3, 1797
- Preceded by: Upton Sheredine
- Succeeded by: William Matthews

Personal details
- Born: November 29, 1756 Perryman, Maryland, U.S.
- Died: April 1, 1808 (aged 51) Baltimore, Maryland, U.S.
- Resting place: Old Spesutia Cemetery; Perryman, Maryland, U.S.
- Party: Anti-Administration (until 1795); Democratic-Republican (from 1795)

Gabriel Christie (November 29, 1756 – April 1, 1808) was an American political leader from Perryman, Maryland.

He was born in Perryman. He served in the Maryland militia during the American Revolution. He served as a member of the Maryland House of Delegates and on a commission for straightening roads.

He represented the sixth district of Maryland in the United States House of Representatives from 1793 to 1797, and again from 1799 to 1801. The 6th district that he represented was in the north-east corner of Maryland, bordering Pennsylvania and Delaware, and did not cover any of the area that had been in the sixth district before the 1792 redistricting. By his second term in congress he is generally identified as a Democratic-Republican.

In 1800–1801 he served as a commissioner of Havre de Grace. He served in the Maryland State Senate (1802–1806).

When Christie died in 1808 in Baltimore, Maryland. He was buried in Old Spesutia Cemetery, St. George's Churchyard in Perryman.

U.S. House of Representatives
Preceded by Upton Sheredine	U.S. Congressman from the 6th district of Maryland; 1793–1797	Succeeded by William Matthews
Preceded by William Matthews	U.S. Congressman from the 6th district of Maryland; 1799–1801	Succeeded by John Archer
