= William D. Byron =

American politician

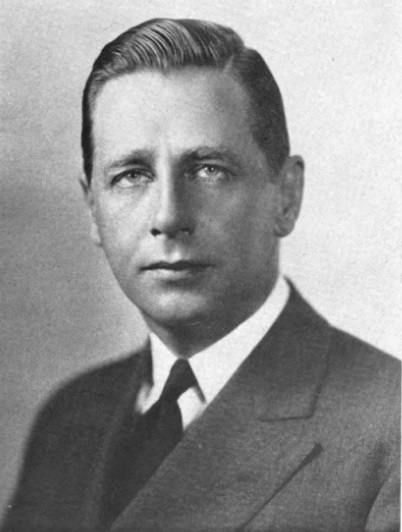
- William D. Byron

Member of the U.S. House of Representatives from Maryland's 6th district
- In office January 3, 1939 – February 27, 1941
- Preceded by: David J. Lewis
- Succeeded by: Katharine Byron

Member of the Maryland Senate
- In office 1930–1934

Mayor of Williamsport
- In office 1926–1930

Personal details
- Born: William Devereux Byron II; May 15, 1895 Danville, Virginia, U.S.
- Died: February 27, 1941 (aged 45) Jonesboro, Georgia, U.S.
- Resting place: Riverview Cemetery
- Party: Democratic
- Spouse: Katharine Byron
- Children: 5, including Goodloe Byron
- Education: Phillips Exeter Academy; Pratt Institute

William Devereux Byron II (May 15, 1895 – February 27, 1941), a Democrat, was a U.S. congressman who represented the 6th congressional district of Maryland from January 3, 1939, to February 27, 1941. After his death in an airplane crash in Georgia on February 27, 1941, his widow, Katharine Byron, a granddaughter of U.S. Senator Louis E. McComas, was elected in a special election to complete his term of office.

Born in Danville, Virginia, he moved with his parents to Williamsport, Maryland in 1900 where he attended the public schools, Phillips Exeter Academy, Exeter, New Hampshire and Pratt Institute, Brooklyn, New York. The Byron family were communicants at Saint John's Church. Following his service in the aviation corps during World War I, where he was commissioned a first lieutenant he entered the family leather manufacturing business in 1919. He served in the Maryland Senate from 1930 to 1934 and as mayor of Williamsport from 1926 to 1930 as had his grandfather, for whom he was named.

In 1940 Byron was challenged by baseball legend, Hall of Famer, and Montgomery County Commissioner Walter Johnson. Byron would narrowly prevail, by a total of 60,037 (53%) to 52,258 (47%), thanks in large part to the power of incumbency and FDR's coat tails.

On February 26, 1941, Congressman Byron boarded Eastern Air Lines Flight 21 at Washington. The plane was en route from New York City to Brownsville, Texas, with stops at Washington, D.C., and Atlanta, Georgia. On its approach to Atlanta's Chandler Field, the Douglas DC-3 crashed, killing 9 of the 16 persons on board, including Byron. Eddie Rickenbacker, flying ace and President of Eastern, survived with serious injuries. Byron was interred in Riverview Cemetery in Williamsport, Maryland.

His son Goodloe Byron was also a representative from Maryland's 6th congressional district.

== See also ==
- List of members of the United States Congress who died in office (1900–1949)

U.S. House of Representatives
| Preceded by David J. Lewis | Member of the U.S. House of Representatives from Maryland's 6th congressional district 1939–1941 | Succeeded by Katharine Byron |
