= Eastern Air Lines Flight 21 =

1941 aviation accident

Coordinates: 33°35′49″N 84°20′50″W

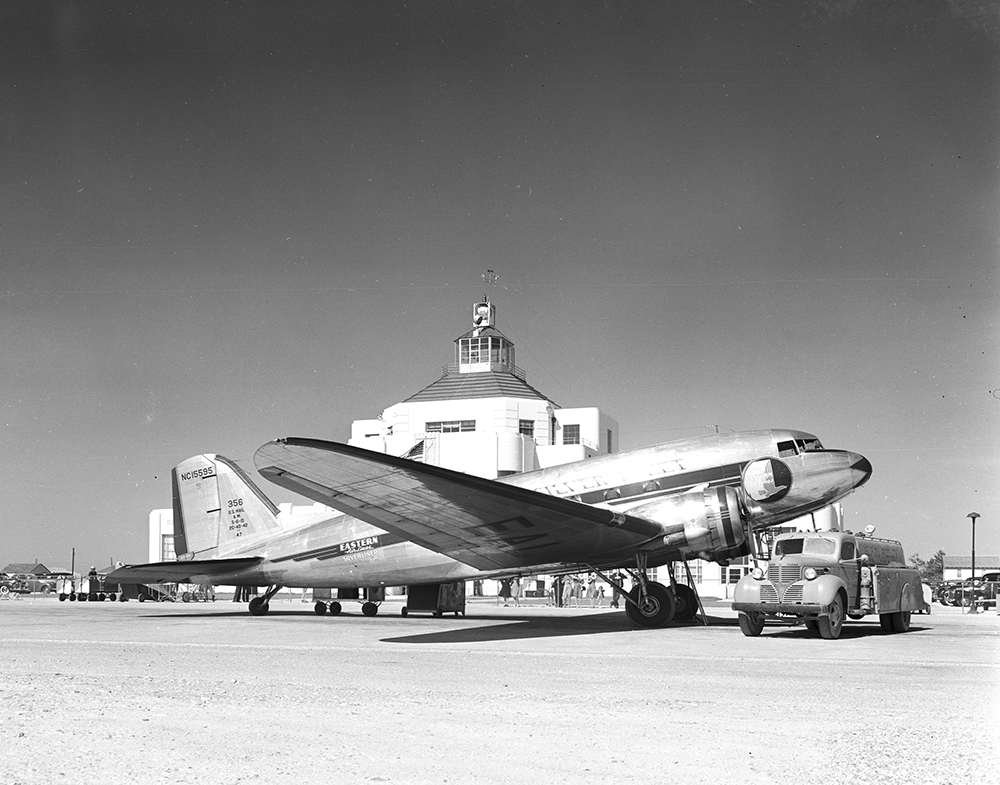
- A Douglas DC-3, similar to the aircraft involved

Accident
- Date: February 26, 1941
- Summary: Controlled flight into terrain due to an improperly set altimeter
- Site: Morrow, near Candler Field, Atlanta, Georgia, USA

Aircraft
- Aircraft type: Douglas DC-3
- Operator: Eastern Air Lines
- Registration: NC28394
- Flight origin: LaGuardia Airport, New York
- 1st stopover: Washington Hoover Airport
- 2nd stopover: Candler Field, Atlanta, Georgia
- 3rd stopover: Moisant Field, New Orleans, Louisiana
- Last stopover: Houston Municipal Airport, Houston, Texas
- Destination: Brownsville, Texas
- Passengers: 13
- Crew: 3
- Fatalities: 8
- Injuries: 8
- Survivors: 8

Eastern Air Lines Flight 21, registration NC28394, was a Douglas DC-3 aircraft that crashed while preparing to land at Candler Field (now Hartsfield-Jackson Atlanta International Airport) in Atlanta, Georgia, on February 26, 1941. Half of the 16 on board were killed, including Maryland Congressman William D. Byron. Among the injured was Eastern Air Lines president and World War I hero Eddie Rickenbacker.

== Synopsis ==
Flight 21 departed New York City's LaGuardia Airport on the evening of February 26, stopping briefly at Washington–Hoover Airport before departing at 9:05 PM Eastern Time for Atlanta. After Atlanta, it was scheduled to stop at New Orleans, Louisiana, and Houston, Texas, before ending its trip at Brownsville, Texas, on the morning of the 27th. At 11:38 PM Central Time, the aircraft called the Eastern Air Lines operator in Atlanta to advise that it had passed over the Stone Mountain reporting point and was descending. The operator provided the pilots with the altimeter setting for Candler Field and with the current weather. Flight 21 then contacted the Atlanta control tower twice, first to advise that it was making an approach and then to advise that the aircraft was over the Atlanta range station two miles southeast of the airport at an altitude of 1,800 feet (550 m). Eastern's company operator then contacted the flight to suggest a straight-in approach; the aircraft acknowledged the transmission, but nothing further was heard. The wreckage was found in a pine grove five miles southeast of the Atlanta Range station just after 6:30 AM. Rescuers found a number of survivors still alive in the wreckage, including Eastern Air Lines President Eddie Rickenbacker, who had suffered a dented skull, other head injuries, shattered left elbow and crushed nerve, paralyzed left hand, several broken ribs, a crushed hip socket, twice-broken pelvis, severed nerve in his left hip, and a broken left knee. Most shocking, his left eyeball was expelled from its socket. Rickenbacker recovered from his injuries after months in a hospital, and regained full eyesight.

== Crash and investigation ==
Investigators with the Civil Aeronautics Board (CAB), the predecessor of the NTSB, determined from the evidence at the site and the survivors' testimony that the aircraft had first struck the tops of three small pine trees while the aircraft was flying in a northerly direction. The lowest tree was struck at an elevation of 915 feet (279 m) above sea level. Flight 21 then apparently continued across a small valley in the same direction in level flight for about 1,500 feet (460 m) before the right wing tip struck the top of a poplar and the aircraft crashed into a thick grove of pine trees. Captain Rickenbacker testified that he first felt a slight bump. At that point, he jumped from his seat and started to move toward the rear of the aircraft, but the aircraft crashed and he was thrown from his feet.

== Aftermath ==
At the time of the accident, it was standard practice for an air carrier aircraft to have two altimeters; one set to sea level air pressure (as expressed in inches of mercury) and referred to during en route flight, and one used for instrument approaches and set to the air pressure of the airport the aircraft was about to land at. In this case, the instrument approach altimeter was found after the crash to be set to 29.92 inches of mercury. However, the altimeter setting at Candler Field on the morning of February 26 was 28.94. This setting had been transmitted to the aircraft by Eastern Air Lines's company operator at 11:38 PM and acknowledged by one of the pilots, but the approach altimeter apparently had been set incorrectly. Although the setting could have been disturbed in the crash, as seems to have happened to the en-route altimeter, the error in the setting was almost exactly one inch of mercury. This would correspond to the difference between the aircraft's actual altitude at the time of the crash and the altitude it should have had during a normal instrument approach.

The CAB issued the following statement as to probable cause:

On the basis of the foregoing findings and the entire record available to us at this time, we find that the probable cause of the accident to NC 28394 (Eastern Air Lines Trip 21) on February 26, 1941, was the failure of the captain in charge of the flight to exercise the proper degree of care by not checking his altimeters to determine whether both were correctly set and properly functioning before commencing his landing approach. A substantial contributing factor was the absence of an established uniform cockpit procedure on Eastern Air Lines by which both the captain and pilot are required to make a complete check of the controls and instruments during landing operations.

— Civil Aeronautics Board

== See also ==
- Aviation safety
- List of accidents and incidents involving commercial aircraft

== Footnotes ==
- Geographical coordinates of crash site
