= William McMahon McKaig =

American politician (1845-1907)

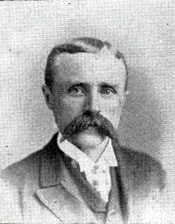

Member of the U.S. House of Representatives from Maryland's 6th district
- In office March 4, 1891 – March 3, 1895
- Preceded by: Louis E. McComas
- Succeeded by: George L. Wellington

36th Mayor of Cumberland, Maryland
- In office 1890
- Preceded by: William A. Withers
- Succeeded by: David J. Blackiston

Personal details
- Born: July 29, 1845 Cumberland, Maryland, U.S.
- Died: June 6, 1907 (aged 61) Cumberland, Maryland, U.S.
- Resting place: Rose Hill Cemetery
- Party: Democratic
- Occupation: Politician, lawyer

William McMahon McKaig (July 29, 1845 – June 6, 1907) was an American politician.

Born in Cumberland, Maryland, McKaig attended the Carroll School and the Allegany County Academy. He studied law and was admitted to the Allegany bar in 1868. He moved to the Colorado Territory in 1873, but later returned to Maryland. He was appointed city attorney of Cumberland in 1876, and was elected to the Maryland House of Delegates in 1877. He was also elected to the Maryland State Senate in 1887, and as mayor of Cumberland in 1890. In 1890, McKaig was elected as a Democrat to the Fifty-second and Fifty-third Congresses from the sixth district of Maryland, and served from March 4, 1891, until March 3, 1895. He was not a candidate for renomination in 1894, and resumed the practice of his profession. He died in Cumberland, and is interred in Rose Hill Cemetery.

U.S. House of Representatives
| Preceded by Louis Emory McComas | Representative of the 6th Congressional District of Maryland; 1891—1895 | Succeeded by George Louis Wellington |
Political offices
| Preceded by William A. Withers | Mayor of Cumberland; 1890–1890 | Succeeded by David J. Blackiston |
