= Louis E. McComas =

American judge (1846–1907)

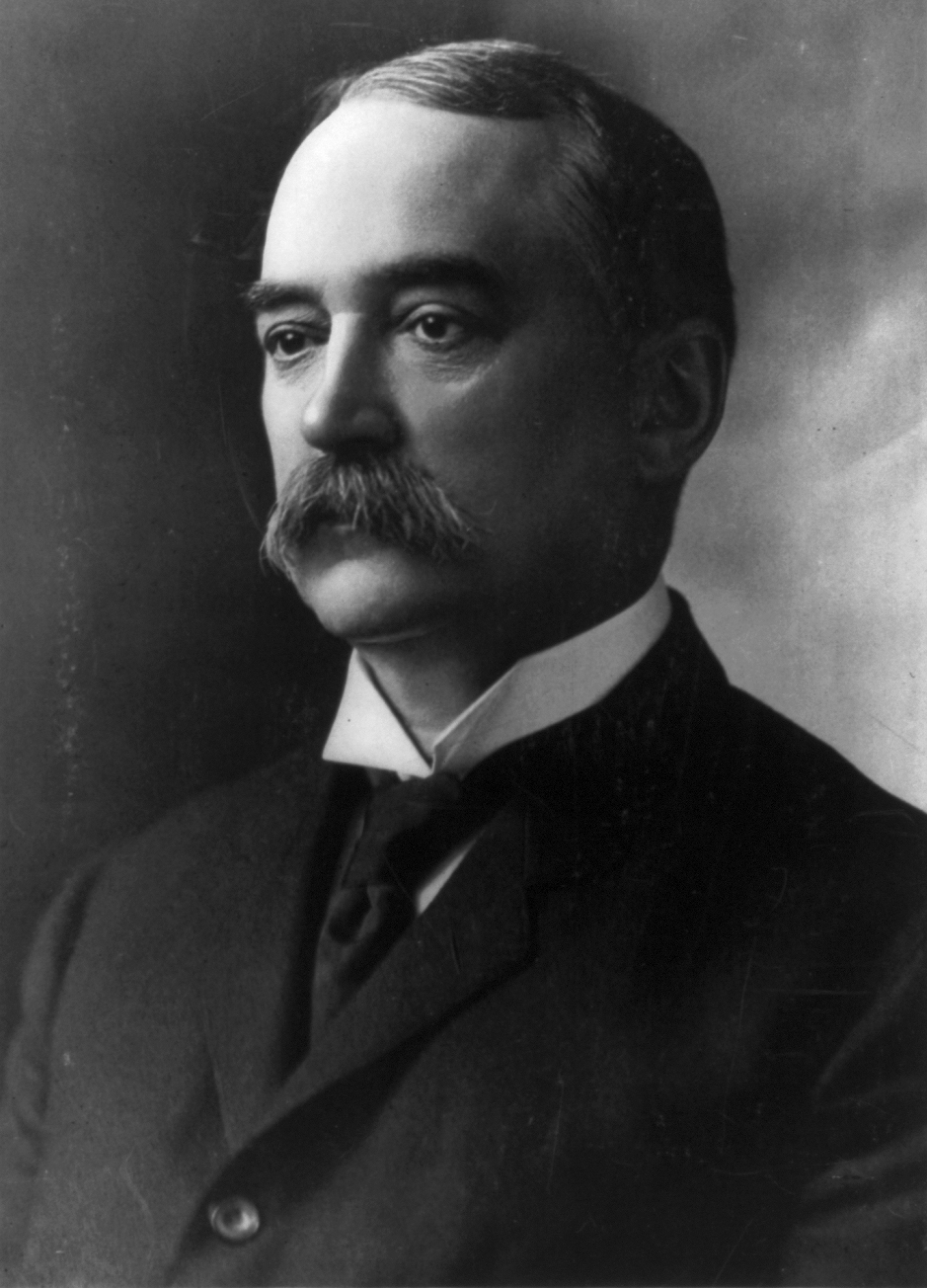

Associate Justice of the Court of Appeals of the District of Columbia
- In office June 26, 1905 – November 10, 1907
- Appointed by: Theodore Roosevelt
- Preceded by: Martin Ferdinand Morris
- Succeeded by: Josiah Alexander Van Orsdel

United States Senator from Maryland
- In office March 4, 1899 – March 3, 1905
- Preceded by: Arthur Pue Gorman
- Succeeded by: Isidor Rayner

Associate Justice of the Supreme Court of the District of Columbia
- In office November 17, 1892 – March 3, 1899
- Appointed by: Benjamin Harrison
- Preceded by: Martin V. Montgomery
- Succeeded by: Harry M. Clabaugh

Member of the U.S. House of Representatives from Maryland's 6th district
- In office March 4, 1883 – March 3, 1891
- Preceded by: Milton Urner
- Succeeded by: William McMahon McKaig

Personal details
- Born: Louis Emory McComas; October 28, 1846 Washington County, Maryland, U.S.
- Died: November 10, 1907 (aged 61) Washington, D.C., U.S.
- Resting place: Rose Hill Cemetery; Hagerstown, Maryland
- Party: Republican
- Relatives: Katharine Byron; Goodloe Byron

Louis Emory McComas (October 28, 1846 – November 10, 1907) was an American attorney, politician, and jurist who served as a member of both branches of the United States Congress and as an associate justice of the Supreme Court of the District of Columbia.

== Early life and education ==
Born on October 28, 1846, in Washington County, Maryland near Hagerstown, McComas attended St. James College (now St. James School) in Maryland, then graduated from Dickinson College in Carlisle, Pennsylvania in 1866 and read law in 1868. He was admitted to the bar and entered private practice in Hagerstown from 1868 to 1892.

== Career ==
=== Congressional service ===
McComas was an unsuccessful Republican candidate for election in 1876 to the 45th United States Congress. He was elected as a Republican from Maryland's 6th congressional district to the United States House of Representatives of the 48th United States Congress and to the three succeeding Congresses, serving from March 4, 1883 to March 3, 1891. He was an unsuccessful candidate for reelection in 1890 to the 52nd United States Congress. He was the secretary of the Republican National Committee in 1892.

=== Private practice ===
During the period after his departure from the United States House of Representatives until his federal judicial appointment, McComas resumed private practice in Baltimore, Maryland. He also was a professor of international law at Georgetown University in Washington, D.C.

=== Supreme Court of the District of Columbia service ===
McComas received a recess appointment from President Benjamin Harrison on November 17, 1892, to an Associate Justice seat on the Supreme Court of the District of Columbia (now the United States District Court for the District of Columbia) vacated by Associate Justice Martin V. Montgomery. He was nominated to the same position by President Harrison on December 6, 1892. He was confirmed by the United States Senate on January 25, 1893, and received his commission the same day. His service terminated on March 3, 1899, due to his resignation.

=== Senate service ===
McComas was elected as a Republican to the United States Senate from Maryland and served from March 4, 1899, until March 3, 1905. He was Chairman of the Committee on Organization, Conduct, and Expenditures of Executive Departments for the 56th United States Congress and Chairman of the Committee on Education and Labor for the 57th and 58th United States Congresses.

=== Court of Appeals of the District of Columbia service ===
McComas received a recess appointment from President Theodore Roosevelt on June 26, 1905, to an Associate Justice seat on the Court of Appeals of the District of Columbia (now the United States Court of Appeals for the District of Columbia Circuit) vacated by Associate Justice Martin Ferdinand Morris. He was nominated to the same position by President Roosevelt on December 5, 1905. He was confirmed by the United States Senate on December 6, 1905, and received his commission the same day. His service terminated on November 10, 1907, due to his death in Washington, D.C. He was interred in Rose Hill Cemetery in Hagerstown.

== Personal life ==
McComas's granddaughter, Katharine Byron, and great-grandson, Goodloe Byron, also represented Maryland in the United States House of Representatives, both from the same seat held by McComas.

== Sources ==
- United States Congress. "Louis E. McComas (id: M000351)". Biographical Directory of the United States Congress.

U.S. House of Representatives
Preceded by Milton Urner	Member of the U.S. House of Representatives from Maryland's 6th congressional district 1883–1891	Succeeded by William McMahon McKaig
U.S. Senate
Preceded by Arthur Pue Gorman	U.S. senator (Class 1) from Maryland; 1899–1905; Served alongside: George L. Wellington, Arthur Pue Gorman	Succeeded by Isidor Rayner
Legal offices
Preceded by Martin V. Montgomery	Associate Justice of the Supreme Court of the District of Columbia; 1892–1899	Succeeded by Harry M. Clabaugh
Preceded by Martin Ferdinand Morris	Associate Justice of the Court of Appeals of the District of Columbia; 1905–1907	Succeeded by Josiah Alexander Van Orsdel
