= McKaig-Hatch =

Defunct tool manufacturer from Buffalo, New York

McKaig-Hatch, Inc.
- Industry: Manufacturing
- Founded: 1913
- Headquarters: 1584-1590 Niagara Street, Buffalo, New York
- Key people: Archibald McKaig, President; Harry C. Young, Vice-President, and Chauncey R. Hatch Secretary and Treasurer
- Products: Hand tools

McKaig-Hatch was a tool manufacturer for the automotive industry. The company, based out of Buffalo, New York made economy tools, and produced and supplied the screwdriver, pliers, and open-end wrenches in the pouch tool kits supplied with new Ford and GM cars from the 1930s through the 1950s.

McKaig-Hatch was founded in Buffalo, New York in 1913 by Archibald McKaig, Harry C. Young, and Chauncey R. Hatch. McKaig-Hatch became a division of Tasa Coal Company, which later became Tasa Corporation.

Advertisement for McKaig-Hatch tools published in the April 1921 issue of Forging and Heat Treating

== See also ==
- List of defunct consumer brands
