= Milton Urner =

American politician (1839–1926)

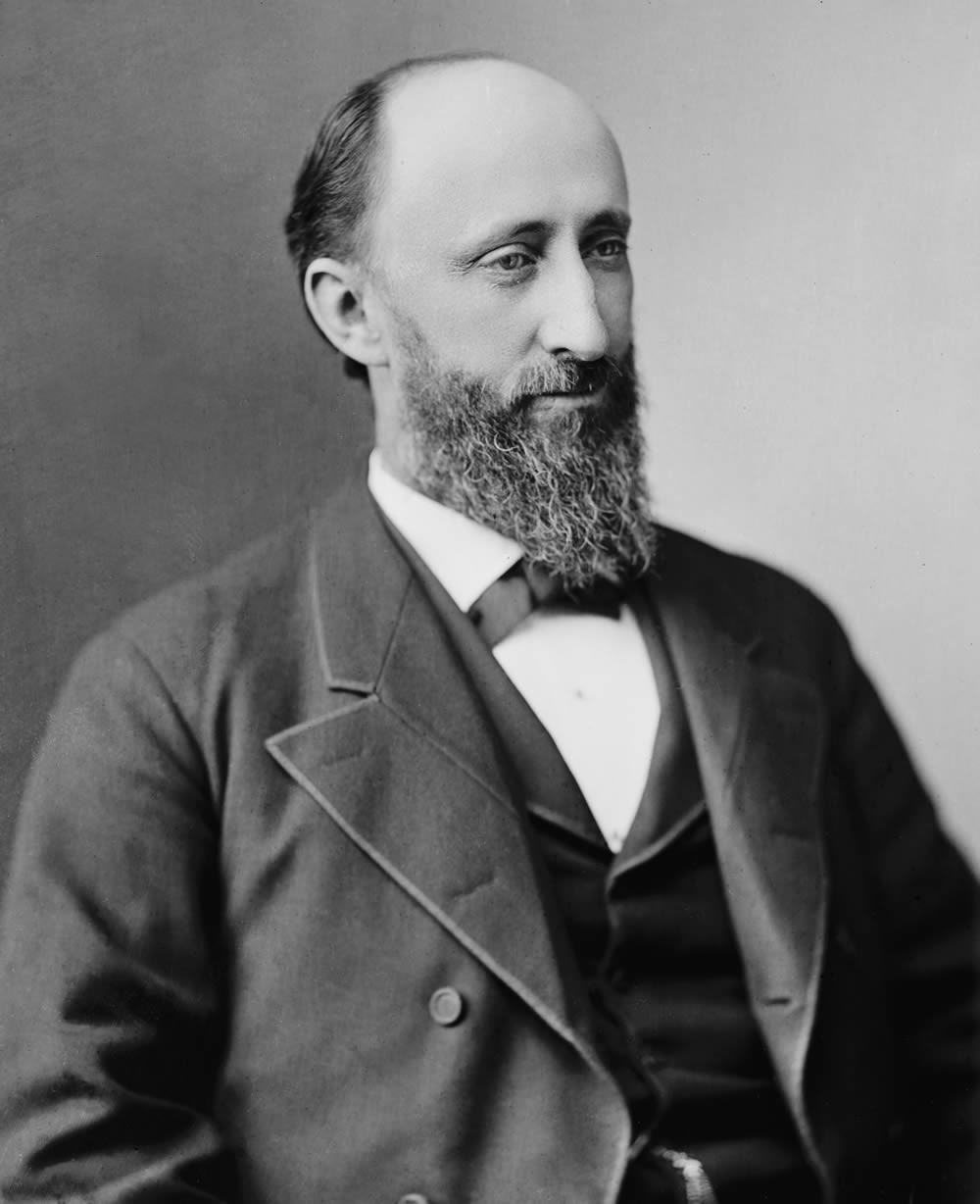
Milton George Urner

Milton George Urner (July 29, 1839 – February 9, 1926) was a U.S. Congressman from the sixth district of Maryland, serving two terms from 1879 until 1883.

== Life ==
Born in the Liberty district of Frederick County, Maryland, Urner was educated in the common schools. He also attended the Freeland Seminary of Montgomery County, Pennsylvania, and Lycoming College of Williamsport, Pennsylvania. He engaged in teaching in his native county from 1859–1862, studied law, and was admitted to the bar in 1863. He commenced practice in Frederick, Maryland, and served as State's attorney for Frederick County from 1871 to 1875.

In 1878, Urner was elected as a Republican to the Forty-sixth and Forty-seventh Congresses (serving from March 4, 1879 to March 3, 1883). While in Congress, Urner served as the chairman of the Committee on Accounts (Forty-seventh Congress). He was not a candidate for renomination in 1882, and resumed the practice of his profession in Frederick. He became local attorney for the Pennsylvania Railroad Co. in 1887, and served as a member of the Maryland State Senate from 1888 until 1890. He was also appointed naval officer at the port of Baltimore by President Benjamin Harrison in 1890.

Urner engaged in banking and other business enterprises later in life, and became a trustee of several educational institutions. He died in Frederick in 1926, and is interred in Mount Olivet Cemetery.

== Family ==
His grandson, Joseph Urner (January 16, 1898 – 1987), was an American sculptor, painter and etcher who created the Alabama State Memorial at Gettysburg, Pennsylvania.

U.S. House of Representatives
Preceded by William Walsh	U.S. Congressman from the 6th district of Maryland; 1879–1883	Succeeded by Louis E. McComas
