= Saint John's Church (Hagerstown, Maryland) =

Historic church in Maryland, United States

Saint John’s Episcopal Church Mount Prospect
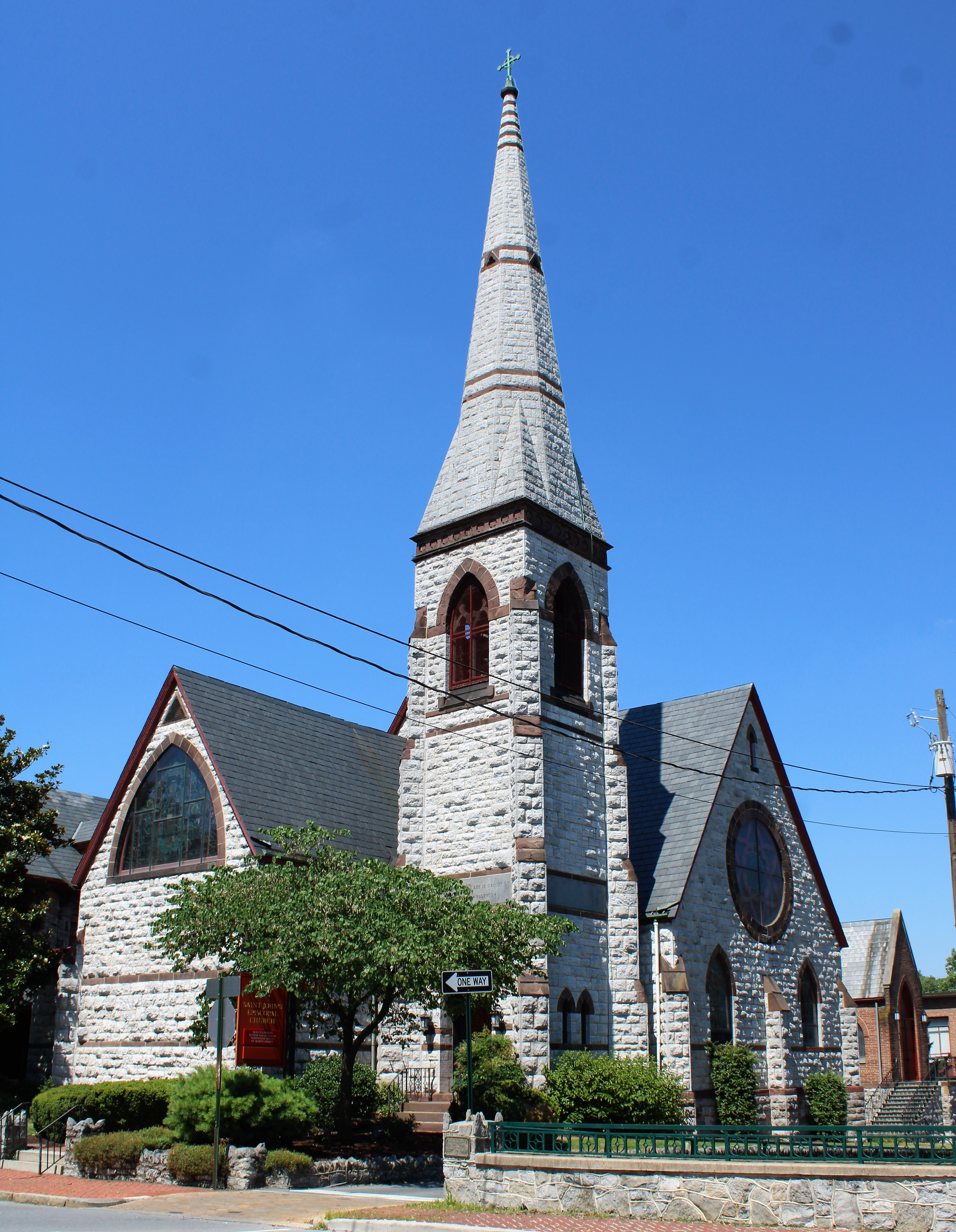
- Saint John’s Episcopal Church; Mount Prospect
- 39.3839°N 77.4335°W
- Location: Hagerstown, Maryland, United States
- Denomination: Episcopal
- Churchmanship: Broad church

History
- Status: Parish church
- Founded: 1786
- Founder: Maryland General Assembly
- Dedication: John the Evangelist

Architecture
- Functional status: Active
- Architect: E.T. Littell
- Architectural type: Church
- Style: Gothic
- Groundbreaking: 1871
- Completed: 1872

Specifications
- Capacity: 300

Administration
- Province: Third
- Diocese: Maryland
- Parish: Saint John’s Parish, lower Cumberland valley

Clergy
- Rector: The Rev. Dr. Richard R. Swanson

St. John's Church, or St. John's Episcopal Church, founded in 1786, is an historic Episcopal church located at 101 South Prospect Street in the South Prospect Street Historic District of Hagerstown, Maryland. It is the seat of Saint John's Parish, Diocese of Maryland, which covers most of Washington County, Maryland.

== History ==
Though it is the mother church of Saint John's Parish in the lower Cumberland valley, Saint John's Church Hagerstown is also one of the many daughter churches of Broad Creek Church of Piscataway Parish. The current physical church is the fourth since establishment of the “Chapel in the Woods” (1747) as a chapel of ease for All Saints Church (1742) in Frederick, Maryland. Services began in 1744, and four decades later the congregation erected a brick church on Mulberry Street in Hagerstown, the site of which is still maintained as the church cemetery. The General Assembly of Maryland separated the congregation from All Saints’ Frederick in 1786, creating a new “Frederick Parish” named for Frederick Calvert, last proprietor of Maryland. In 1797, Bishop John Thomas Claggett consecrated the sanctuary and in 1806, the Episcopal Diocese of Maryland renamed the parish after Saint John the Evangelist.

Saint John's rector in the late Federal period was the Rev. Thomas P. Irving, one of the foremost Greek and Latin scholars of that period. Native to Somerset County, Maryland, Irving attended Princeton College and thereafter supported himself as a teacher as well as minister. He was headmaster at New Bern Academy and later, the Hagerstown Academy, the educational mission of which is carried on by Saint James School. Bishop William White ordained him as a priest. The mission of advancing learning in Hagerstown has been integral to the work of Saint John's Church. The Rev. George Lemmon conducted weekly lectures through to 1827. In 1842, Saint John's rector Theodore Benedict Lyman served as the Bishop's agent in identifying and purchasing the grounds for Saint James School.

A second church was built in the Federal style at the corner of Jonathan (now Summit) and Antietam Streets in 1823, and consecrated by the second bishop of Maryland. During the American Civil War (1861-1865), Saint John's Church was attended by a large number of Southern sympathizers. However, its Rector, Rev. Henry Edwards, was decidedly pro-Union and served as the U.S. Hospital Chaplain at Hagerstown from Nov. 13, 1862 through March 5, 1863, in the aftermath of the battle of Antietam. On the Sunday before that battle, he preached from Saint John's pulpit before a congregation of Confederate officers and soldiers, yet lifted up a prayer for Abraham Lincoln, the President of the United States. On another occasion, Rev. Edwards did the same before “the whole of Longstreet’s division.”

== Architecture ==
The present church building, built in 1872, was an American adaptation of the Oxford Movement in sanctuary design. Other features included coursed rows of rough-hewn blue limestone with stringcourses, sills and lintels of brownstone, stained-glass Gothic windows; and a bell tower with a stone steeple. Two heavy oak doors, painted red, are covered with elaborate scrolled pattern in bronze reminiscent of the Lichfield Cathedral in England. The foyer at the tower's base is decorated in the Arts & Crafts style, the ceiling have sixty small six-point stars cut into the ceiling and illuminated from above. In December 1871, a fire in the town's business district destroyed the Federalist style sanctuary built in 1832 at the corner of Jonathan and Antietam Streets. The initial sanctuary space was sparsely, but tastefully, accommodated.

In 1899, Mollie Magill Rosenberg, a former communicant, donated a high Gothic Altar and associated supporting pieces, including a reredos. An identical matching set was installed at Grace Episcopal Church (Galveston, Texas), the Magill-Rosenberg family's home church, by Silas McBee.

Easter Sunday 1899, Saint John's dedicated the High Altar and continued a 60-year journey transforming the Sanctuary from the colonial Neo-classical style to a style embracing England's Oxford Movement and the return to medieval forms. The transformation later continued, most notably through the replacement of the original windows with stained-glass designs depicting the life of Christ, chronologically, more or less. The donor, Mollie Magill Rosenberg, was spouse to Col. Henry Rosenberg, C.S.A. Henry served as Switzerland's consul to Texas after 1869. Mrs. Rosenberg attended the Columbian Exposition in 1893, where the High Altar and its Reredos were on display in the Swiss Pavilion. Like the Oxford Movement, the Columbian Exposition highlighted revival, rather than progressive, movements in the arts and architecture. Abrupt changes in peoples’ lives during industrialization were thought to be ameliorated by antiquarian and, allegedly, more ‘authentic’ forms.

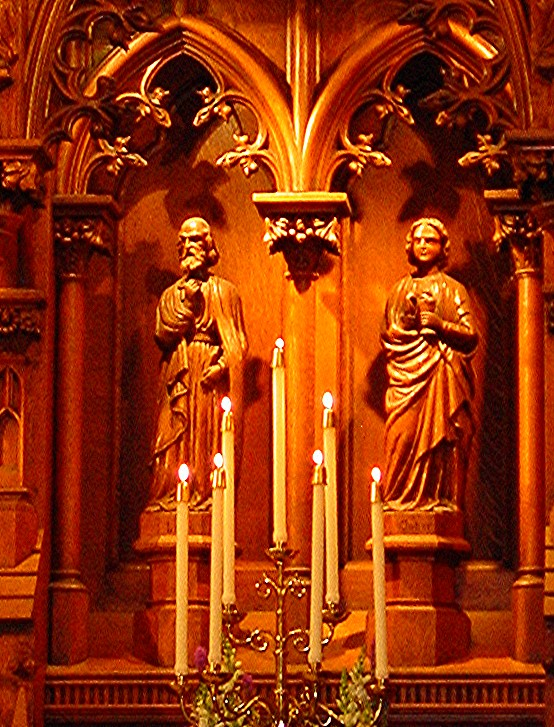
Detail of the Saint John's Hagerstown Reredos.

The High Altar and Reredos are metaphors for Christ as the Word Incarnate. Saint John's wrought iron rood screen separates the Sanctuary from the Apex and Congregation. The Reredos is a scaled-down model of a larger more elaborate medieval gothic Rood Screen. The bronze relief at the center sits in what would have been the passageway from the Apex to the Sanctuary (through which the communicants would have witnessed the consecration of the Host). Above, a crossbridge (see the miniature passageway and small windows running laterally below the gables) connects what would have been the cathedral's north and south transepts. Such crossbridges allowed non-celebrating clergy to move about the cathedral on business, unseen, while Mass was said below. So while the Reredos is a reredos, it is also a model of a Rood Screen.

Separating the Reredos from the High Altar is a Sanctus ribbon from the 1559 B.C.P., drawing on Isaiah 6:3 but lacking the Benedictus found in the 1549 B.C.P. Sanctus, derived from Matthew 21:9. The Sanctus is followed by Psalm 50:5, the call to be judged for the acts of one's life, before the Throne of God.

The High Altar's base features a triptych of two Old Testament events laying foundations for Christ's priesthood. They flank a third central panel depicting the Last Supper at which Christ instituted the Holy Eucharist. The Old Testament carvings both concern Abraham: The Binding of Isaac Upon an Altar to God, Genesis 22:1-24 (left side) and the Blessing of Abraham by the High Priest Melchizedek of Salem Following the Battle of the Kings, Genesis 14:17-20 (right side). The Last Supper, John 13-21 (center), was carved from a print of the mural by Leonardo da Vinci for dining room wall of the monastery Santa Maria delle Grazie (Milan, Italy). Between the triptych's three panel carvings, the Swiss woodcarvers made an artistic pun, using as pillars supporting the Altar itself three Church fathers–Peter (Rome ), John (Antioch) and James (Jerusalem) – identified by a fourth Apostle, the roving Paul as “pillars” of the Church. See Galatians 2:9. Peter holds the keys to Church; Paul holds the decapitating sword; John carries the New Testament to which he contributed; and James is supported by the cudgel of his martyrdom.

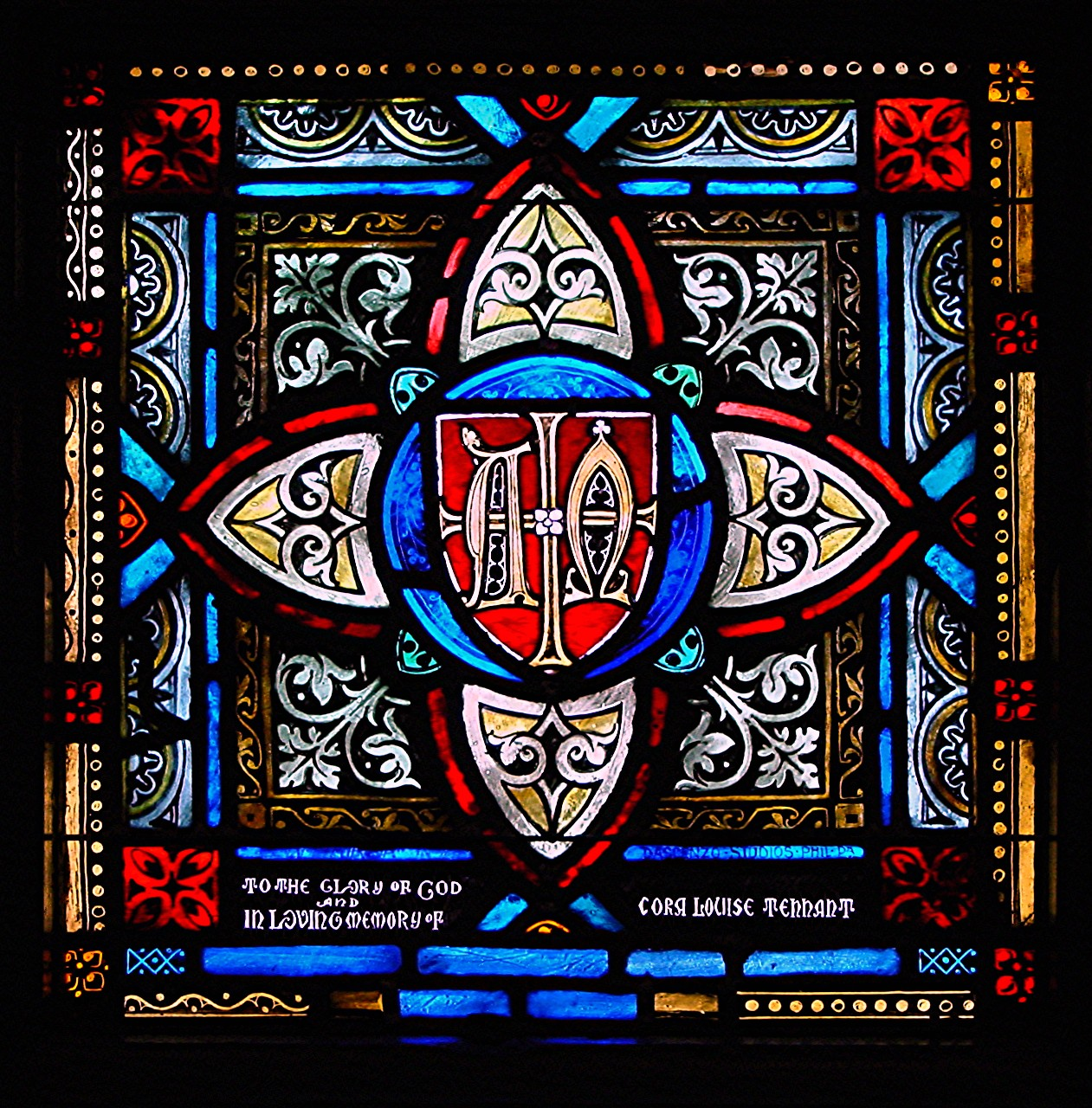
Tennant Memorial Window.

Christ and Saint John are depicted three times in the combined High Altar and Reredos: Church patron and the Christ served by the Church numbered in the Creator, Redeemer and Sanctifier. The “three theme” runs throughout the work, as in the trefoils – representative of the Holy Trinity – in peaked gables. The Last Supper forms the south arm of a Greek Cross. The Reredos itself provides the east, west and north arms. The center of the cross is the bronze relief of the Nativity and the Crucifixion. Note the Star of Bethlehem, centerline. This Star is often used to mark the moment of equipoise at which the human Jesus received divine aspect, becoming of the Trinity. Angels stand at either side of the bronze relief: one with arms crossed and the other with hands in prayer. Across the Greek Cross's arms are the four Gospel authors, saints Matthew, Mark, Luke and John. John holds the chalice poisoned to kill him at Ephesus, alluding to its miraculous purification during which he exorcised the Serpent. The other three Gospel writers hold quills and tablets, the tools of their craft.
