= F. Vernon Boozer =

American politician (1936–2025)

F. (Frank) Vernon Boozer

Member of the Maryland Senate from the 9th district
- In office January 1981 – January 13, 1999
- Preceded by: John J. Bishop Jr.
- Succeeded by: Andrew P. Harris

Member of the Maryland House of Delegates from the 10th district
- In office 1975–1979
- Preceded by: Constituency established
- Succeeded by: Donald K. Hughes, Thomas B. Kernan, and Mark C. Medairy Jr.

Member of the Maryland House of Delegates from Baltimore County District 4
- In office 1971–1975
- Preceded by: Eugene Gallagher, William O. Jensen Jr., and Herbert H. Tyler
- Succeeded by: Constituency abolished

Personal details
- Born: Frank Vernon Boozer; January 30, 1936 Norfolk, Virginia, U.S.
- Died: November 16, 2025 (aged 89) Cockeysville, Maryland, U.S.
- Party: Republican
- Spouse: Diane Hughes Boozer

Frank Vernon Boozer (January 30, 1936 – November 16, 2025) was an American politician who was a Republican member of the Maryland Senate from the 9th district from 1981 to 1999.

== Background ==
Boozer served Maryland as a Republican delegate and state senator for nearly 30 years. He served District 9, which was a portion of Baltimore County. In 1986, he ran unopposed in the general election, having defeated Howard W. Kramer Sr. in the primary election with 91% of the vote.

He faced a Democratic challenger in 1990, but Kauko H. Kokkonen only managed to secure 20% of the vote to Boozer's 80%.

In 1994, Boozer again ran unopposed. His biggest challenge was in the Republican Primary where John C. Head managed to get 48% of the vote.

In 1998, Boozer was defeated in the Republican primary by Andy Harris, an anesthesiologist who had never run for office before. Harris won the race with 54% of the vote to Boozer's 46%. Harris went on to defeat Anthony O. Blades in the general election. According to an article in The Washington Post, Boozer may have lost his election bid because of his pro-choice views in a very conservative district. He used a procedural move to derail a partial-birth abortion ban a year earlier after it passed out of committee, leading the bill's sponsor, Larry E. Haines, to endorse Harris.

Boozer died on November 16, 2025, at the age of 89.

== Education ==
Boozer graduated from Duke University in Durham, North Carolina with his A.B. in 1958. He returned to college and received his J.D. from the University of Maryland School of Law in 1964.

== Career ==
After law school, Boozer entered into the practice of law. He was then selected to be a Trial Magistrate for Baltimore County and served from 1967 until 1968.

In 1971, Boozer was first elected to the Maryland House of Delegates. He served in the House until 1979. During that time, he was a member of the Economic Matter Committee and the Judiciary Committee.

In 1981, he was first elected to the Maryland Senate. He served in the Maryland Senate until 1999. Boozer was the minority leader from 1996 until he was defeated in 1999. Boozer was also a minority whip, holding this position from 1990 until 1996. During his time in the Senate, he was on the Finance Committee for two stints (1981–84 & 1991–92), the Executive Nominations Committee from 1984 until 1994, the Judicial Proceedings Committee, also for two stints, (1985–90 & 1993–94), and the Joint Budget and Audit Committee from 1984 until 1994. Other committees that he served on include the Legislative Policy Committee, 1990–99, the Joint Committee on Administrative, Executive and Legislative Review, 1994, the Budget and Taxation Committee, 1995–99, the Rules Committee, 1995–99, the Joint Committee on the Management of Public Funds, 1995–99, and the Spending Affordability Committee, 1996–99. Finally, he was a member of the Special Study Commission on the Maryland Public Ethics Law from 1998 until 1999. In addition to his work as a state senator and state delegate, Boozer also was selected to be a delegate to the Republican Party National Convention in 1996. He was also once presented with the Best in Class award from the Maryland Chamber of Commerce in 1997.

In 2000, Boozer was appointed by Republican Governor Bob Ehrlich to serve as vice chair on the Special Committee on Voting Systems & Election Procedures in Maryland. This committee was charged with evaluating the election systems in Maryland, to evaluate procedures for recounts and contested election, and to ensure fair elections.

In 2002, Boozer was tapped again by Governor Ehrlich to a four-year term to serve on the State Advisory Council on Administrative Hearings, along with Nancy S. Grasmick, Nathan J. Greenbaum, Susan Dishler Shubin, Evelyn B. McCarter, and Suzanne M. Owen. In 2018, Maryland Governor Larry Hogan appointed Boozer to the Maryland Lottery and Gaming Control Commission. After leaving office, Boozer continued to practice law in Towson, Maryland, and was active in the Maryland Legal Services Corporation.
