= Andy Harris (politician) =

American politician (born 1957)

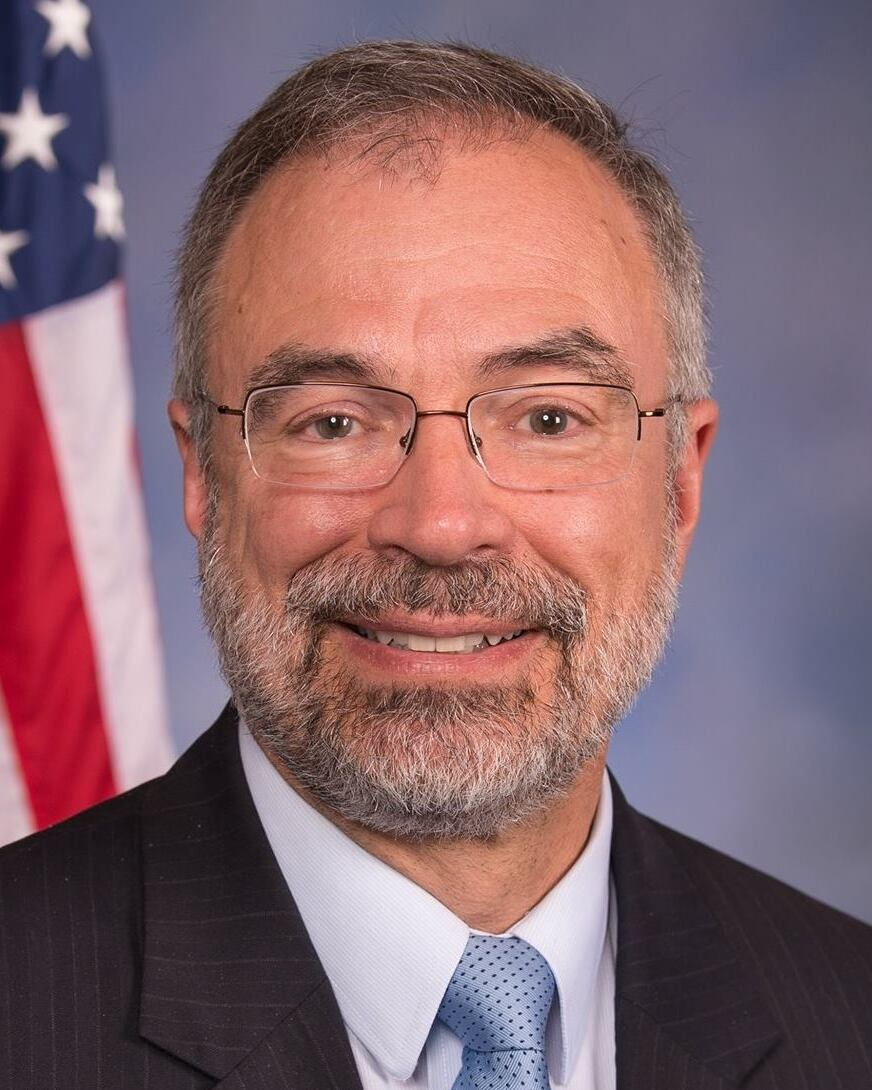
- Official portrait, 2018

Chair of the House Freedom Caucus
- Incumbent
- Assumed office September 17, 2024
- Preceded by: Bob Good

Member of the U.S. House of Representatives from Maryland's 1st district
- Incumbent
- Assumed office January 3, 2011
- Preceded by: Frank Kratovil

Member of the Maryland Senate
- In office January 13, 1999 – January 3, 2011
- Preceded by: Vernon Boozer (9th); Norman Stone (7th)
- Succeeded by: Robert Kittleman (9th); J. B. Jennings (7th)
- Constituency: 9th district (1999–2003); 7th district (2003–2011)

Personal details
- Born: Andrew Peter Harris; January 25, 1957 (age 69) New York City, New York, U.S.
- Party: Republican
- Spouses: Cookie Harris (m. 1981; died 2014); Nicole Beus (m. 2017)
- Children: 5
- Education: Johns Hopkins University (BS, MD, MHS)
- Website: House website Campaign website

Military service
- Branch/service: United States Navy; Navy Reserve
- Years of service: 1988–2005
- Rank: Commander
- Unit: Navy Medical Corps
- Battles/wars: Operation Desert Storm
- Harris's voice Harris on COVID-19 vaccine research and Operation Warp Speed; Recorded September 14, 2020

Andrew Peter Harris (born January 25, 1957) is an American politician and physician who has served since 2011 as the U.S. representative for Maryland's 1st congressional district. A member of the Republican Party, Harris was previously a member of the Maryland Senate from 1999 until 2011.

Before entering politics, Harris worked as an anesthesiologist at Johns Hopkins University and commanded the Johns Hopkins Naval Reserve Medical Unit from 1989 to 1992.

Since 2013, Harris has been the only Republican in Maryland's congressional delegation. He became chair of the House Freedom Caucus in 2024.

== Early life, education, and career ==
Harris's father was Zoltán Harris, an anesthesiologist who was born in Miskolc, Hungary, in 1911, fought against the Allies in World War II as part of the pro-Nazi Hungarian Army, and emigrated to the U.S. in 1950 after serving time in the Soviet Gulag; his mother, Irene (Koczerzuk), was born in Zarice, Poland. Harris was born in New York, grew up in Queens, and attended Regis High School in Manhattan.

Harris earned his BS in biology (1977) and his MD (1980) from Johns Hopkins University. The university's School of Hygiene and Public Health conferred his MHS in 1995 in health policy and management and health finance and management.

Harris served in the Navy Medical Corps and the U.S. Naval Reserve as a commander on active duty during Operation Desert Storm. He previously worked as an anesthesiologist, an associate professor of anesthesiology and critical care medicine, and as chief of obstetric anesthesiology at Johns Hopkins Hospital. Harris also served as commanding officer for the Johns Hopkins Naval Reserve Medical Unit from 1989 to 1992.

== Maryland General Assembly ==
Harris was first elected to the Maryland Senate in 1998 for District 9, including part of Baltimore County. He defeated his predecessor, Minority Leader F. Vernon Boozer, in the 1998 primary election. A major factor in the race was Boozer's role in derailing an attempt to ban partial-birth abortion a year earlier; the bill's sponsor, fellow state senator Larry Haines, supported Harris's primary bid. In the general election he defeated Democratic nominee Anthony O. Blades.

Harris's district was later redrawn to be District 7, representing parts of Harford County, succeeding Norman Stone. He defeated Democratic nominee Diane DeCarlo in the general election in 2002, and from 2003 to 2006 served as the minority whip. He was reelected in 2006, defeating Patricia A. Foerster. He was succeeded by J. B. Jennings.

In August 2001, following speculation that U.S. representative Bob Ehrlich would run for governor of Maryland in 2002, Harris formed an exploratory committee to explore a potential run for Congress in Maryland's 2nd congressional district. He ultimately decided against running.

== U.S. House of Representatives ==
=== Elections ===
==== 2008 ====
2008 Republican primary results by county: Harris: 40–50%; 50–60%; 60–70%; Gilchrist: 30–40%; 40–50%; 50–60%; 60–70%; Thomas: 30–40%

Harris defeated incumbent Republican Wayne Gilchrest and state senator E. J. Pipkin in the Republican primary for Maryland's 1st congressional district. Harris ran well to the right of Gilchrest, a moderate Republican. He explained that he was upset with Gilchrest's decision to support a Democrat-sponsored bill setting a timetable for troop withdrawal from Iraq and suspected that many of his constituents also felt that way. He was endorsed by the Club for Growth, which raised nearly $250,000 for him, former governor Bob Ehrlich, seven of 10 state senators who represent parts of the district, and House minority leader Anthony O'Donnell. His general election opponent, Queen Anne's County state's attorney Frank Kratovil, criticized the Club for Growth's policies, and Harris for having its support. Gilchrest endorsed Kratovil.

On paper, Harris had a strong advantage in the general election due to its Republican lean. Although Democrats and Republicans are nearly tied in registration, the district has a strong tinge of social conservatism that favors Republicans. It had been in Republican hands for all but 14 years since 1947, although Kratovil received a significant boost when Gilchrest endorsed him.

On election night, Kratovil led Harris by 915 votes. After two rounds of counting absentee ballots, Kratovil's lead grew to 2,000 votes. Forecasting that there was little chance for Harris to close the gap, most media outlets declared Kratovil the winner on the night of November 7. Harris conceded on November 11.

Harris dominated his longtime base in Baltimore's heavily Republican eastern suburbs, which account for most of the district's share of Baltimore County, but failed to carry a single county on the Eastern Shore.

==== 2010 ====
Harris ran again in the 1st District in 2010. He defeated Rob Fisher, a conservative businessman, in the primary.

Harris's primary win set up a rematch against Kratovil. Libertarian Richard James Davis and Independent Jack Wilson also ran. In the November 2 general election, Harris defeated Kratovil by 14%.

==== 2012 ====
The National Journal's Cook Political Report named Harris one of the top 10 Republicans most vulnerable to redistricting in 2012, noting that Maryland Democrats could redraw Harris's home in Cockeysville out of the 1st. Instead, Roscoe Bartlett's 6th District was redrawn. Some of Bartlett's shares of Harford, Baltimore, and Carroll counties were drawn into the 1st, making this already strongly Republican district even more so.

Harris was reelected, defeating Democratic nominee Wendy Rosen with 67% of the vote. Rosen withdrew from the race after being confronted with evidence that she had voted in both Maryland and Florida in the 2006 and 2008 elections. Rosen had property in Florida, and Maryland law allowed property owners to vote in local elections even if they live elsewhere. But her Florida voting registration reportedly also gave her access to state and federal elections there, which was prohibited by Maryland law. At the time Rosen withdrew, ballots had already been printed. John LaFerla, who had narrowly lost to Rosen in the primary, was endorsed as Rosen's replacement, but could only be a write-in.

==== 2014 ====
Harris defeated Democratic nominee Bill Tilghman with over 70% of the vote.

==== 2016 ====
Harris won the Republican primary, defeating three challengers with 78.4% of the vote. Former Maryland state delegate Mike Smigiel came in second place with 10.8%. Smigiel ran because he opposed Harris's strident opposition to marijuana decriminalization in the District of Columbia.

In the general election, Harris won another term with 229,135 votes (67.8%), defeating Democratic nominee Joe Werner, a "little-known Harford County attorney and perennial candidate" who received 94,776 votes (28%). Libertarian candidate Matt Beers received 14,207 votes (4.2%). In February 2016, Harris was the first congressman to endorse Ben Carson for the Republican nomination for president. Carson dropped out two weeks later after a poor performance in the Super Tuesday March 1 primaries.

==== 2018 ====
While Harris was running for reelection, the Maryland Democratic Party accused him of ethics violations, alleging that he might have violated ethics rules requiring members to report the source of spousal income and assets. In response, the Harris campaign said the omission was a mistake, and Harris amended his filing once he became aware of the error.

In the general election, Harris defeated Democratic nominee Jesse Colvin with 60% of the vote.

==== 2020 ====
Harris defeated Democratic nominee Mia Mason with over 63% of the vote.

==== 2022 ====
Harris had initially promised to serve only six terms (12 years) in the House, but opted to run again in 2022. Maryland state legislators had passed a new congressional map that gave Democrats an advantage over Republicans in all eight of the state's congressional districts, but the map was ruled unconstitutional by Judge Lynne A. Battaglia in March 2022. Afterwards, legislators passed a new map that was signed into law by Governor Larry Hogan in April 2022, which returned the district to being solidly Republican. However, it was slightly less Republican than its predecessor.

In the general election, Harris faced former state delegate Heather Mizeur, whom he sought to portray as a tax-approving liberal who would increase federal spending and support Nancy Pelosi as Speaker of the United States House of Representatives. Mizeur, in turn, characterized Harris as an ineffective legislator and criticized him for challenging the results of the 2020 presidential election and for supporting the Life at Conception Act. Harris defeated Mizeur with 54.4 percent of the vote, his closest race since his 2010 victory.

==== 2024 ====
Harris was re-elected to an eighth term in 2024, defeating Democratic challenger Blaine Miller III in the general election with 59.41% of the vote.

==== 2026 ====
Harris is running for re-election to a ninth term in 2026, and faces Democratic challenger Dan Schwartz in the general election.

In October 2026, during a debate with Schwartz, Harris blamed Democratic environmental policies for the increase in diesel prices caused by the 2026 Iran war, after which he was interrupted by laughter, groans, and shouting from the audience. He then criticized the audience for not respecting his First Amendment right to freedom of speech before singling out one of the crowd members who interrupted him by saying "[y]ou should let me finish the sentence, ma'am. You're rude." Following the debate, Harris convened a news conference with reporters, where he argued reporters did not have permission to record him—citing Maryland's two-party consent law, which does not apply to public conversations—and singled out Cat Murphy, a student journalist with the Capital News Service, after she asked him to respect the press. Harris then threatened to refer Murphy to a prosecutor and ordered his staff to get police after she refused to leave. In a follow-up interview with Fox 45, Harris refused to apologize for his confrontation with Murphy, instead explaining that he was bothered because "she didn't ask a question, she criticized the way I was conducting the news conference".

=== Committee assignments ===
For the 118th Congress:

- Committee on Appropriations
  - Subcommittee on Agriculture, Rural Development, Food and Drug Administration, and Related Agencies (Chair)
  - Subcommittee on Homeland Security
  - Subcommittee on Labor, Health and Human Services, Education, and Related Agencies

=== Caucus memberships ===
- Freedom Caucus
- Congressional Caucus on Turkey and Turkish Americans
- Congressional Motorcycle Caucus
- Congressional Ukraine Caucus

== Political positions ==
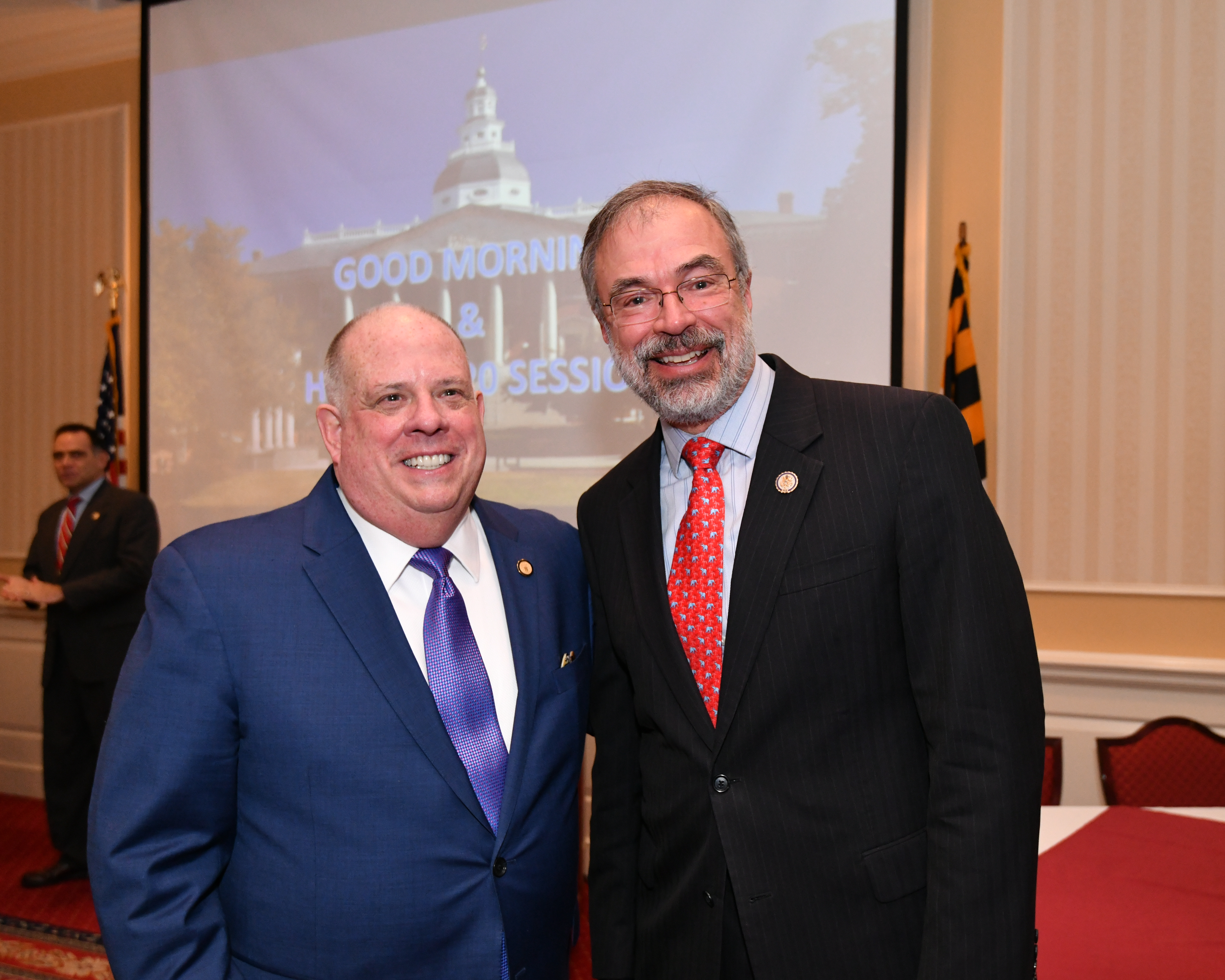
Harris with Governor Larry Hogan, 2020

During the 117th United States Congress, GovTrack rated Harris as the 60th most conservative member of the House of Representatives. The Washington Post described Harris as "an ardent supporter of President Donald Trump", whose right-wing populism he has called the "future of the Republican Party". He initially endorsed neurosurgeon Ben Carson for president during the 2016 Republican primaries, but later backed Trump after Carson suspended his campaign. A member of the House Freedom Caucus, Harris unsuccessfully ran for chairmanship of the Republican Study Committee in 2016, during which he campaigned on uniting the caucus and committee. Harris voted with President Donald Trump's stated position 94.7% of the time in the 119th Congress through 2025, according to a VoteHub analysis.

=== Domestic policy ===
==== Abortion ====
Harris identifies as "pro-life".

During the 2000 legislative session, Harris introduced a bill to ban abortions after fetal viability.

In 2004, Harris cosigned a letter opposing the Ronald Reagan and Christopher Reeve Stem Cell Research Act, which would require the state to provide $25 million toward stem cell research annually. He also introduced the Human Cloning Prohibition Act, a bill to ban stem cell research in Maryland. In 2006, Harris filibustered a bill to provide $25 million a year toward stem cell research.

In 2006, Harris opposed a bill to allow pharmacists to provide patients with emergency contraception without a prescription. In July 2014, he praised the U.S. Supreme Court's decision in Burwell v. Hobby Lobby Stores, Inc., which exempted privately held for-profit corporations from having to cover contraception under the Affordable Care Act. In 2023, Harris cosigned an amicus brief to the United States Court of Appeals for the Fifth Circuit supporting a lower court ruling in Alliance for Hippocratic Medicine v. FDA, which temporarily repealed the Food and Drug Administration's approval of mifepristone.

In 2015, following the release of undercover videos by the Center for Medical Progress, an anti-abortion group, that purportedly showed Planned Parenthood selling tissues from aborted fetuses, Harris spoke in support of a bill to block Medicaid funds from health care providers that performed abortions. He was later appointed to the United States House Select Investigative Panel on Planned Parenthood.

During the 2019 State of the Union Address, Harris praised remarks made by President Donald Trump on efforts to restrict women's access to abortion.

In 2021, Harris cosponsored the Life at Conception Act, a bill to ban abortions without exceptions. In June 2022, Harris celebrated the Supreme Court's ruling in Dobbs v. Jackson Women's Health Organization, which overturned Roe v. Wade. Following the ruling, Harris said he would support a federal six-week abortion ban. In July 2022, Harris voted against bills codifying Roe, to protect patients who travel across state lines to get an abortion, and to protect the right to contraception. During a debate in October 2022, he said he would support a bill introduced by Senator Lindsey Graham that would ban abortions after 15 weeks of pregnancy.

==== Budget and economy ====
Harris supports a federal balanced budget and opposes earmarks. He opposes increases to the debt ceiling without cuts to federal spending, and opposes increases to taxes and to the federal minimum wage. Harris supports eliminating tax deductions and implementing a flat tax.

In August 2013, Harris proposed using the debt ceiling to delay the Affordable Care Act's implementation by one year as opposed to voting to defund it. On October 16, 2013, Harris voted against the motion to end the government shutdown and raise the debt ceiling.

In March 2015, Harris proposed "shutting down the White House" by halving appropriations funding as opposed to a government shutdown.

In January 2018, Harris voted for a Senate stopgap funding bill to end the 2018–2019 United States federal government shutdown. In March 2018, he voted against the $1.3 trillion omnibus spending package, calling it "fiscally irresponsible".

In 2022, following a spike in gas prices as the result of the Russo-Ukrainian War, Harris supported efforts to extend Maryland's gas tax holiday until the end of the year.

In April 2023, Harris praised the Republican debt ceiling plan, which limited spending to pre-pandemic levels with one percent annual growth over a decade. He was among the 71 Republicans who voted against final passage of the Fiscal Responsibility Act of 2023 in the House.

In May 2025, Harris flipped his vote from "nay" to "present" as one of five Republican holdouts on the One Big Beautiful Bill Act, ultimately allowing it to pass in the House. In July 2025, Harris later flipped his vote from "present" to "aye" after the One Big Beautiful Bill Act passed the Senate, attributing his change of heart to overnight negotiations.

==== Crime and policing ====
During the 2003 legislative session, Harris voted against a bill to impose a two-year moratorium on death penalty sentences.

In 2020, Harris said he supported President Trump's decision to deploy the National Guard in response to George Floyd protests. He voted against removing a marble bust of Justice Roger B. Taney from the U.S. Capitol, saying that while he supported proposals to add a bust of Justice Thurgood Marshall, he believed the Taney bust should remain as a "teaching moment".

In August 2025, Harris said that he would support sending National Guard members to Baltimore to "quickly clean up" crime, saying that there were "many areas of the city where you can't go in or you're afraid to go in because crime is just not controlled".

==== Education ====
During the 2001 legislative session, Harris introduced legislation to create a statewide program to provide state-funded scholarships to students attending private schools.

In August 2025, Harris wrote a letter to Maryland state superintendent Carey Wright threatening to work with the Trump administration and utilize his position on the House Appropriations Committee to withhold Maryland's federal education funds after Wright intervened in a conflict between Somerset County's school board and its superintendent, Ava Tasker-Mitchell, who was temporarily reinstated to her position by Wright after the county school board's MAGA-aligned majority voted to remove Tasker-Mitchell in a closed-door meeting.

==== Environment ====
Harris has questioned whether human activities have contributed to climate change, but supports using technological developments, such as hydrogen cells and nuclear fusion, to tackle climate change. He also supports providing federal funding toward Chesapeake Bay cleanup efforts, having played an instrumental role in restoring $60 million in funding for the Chesapeake Bay cleanup program following earlier proposals that saw the program receive no funding.

In July 2017, Harris amended the 2018 Consolidated Appropriations Act to ban federal funding for any wind farms projects that were closer than 24 nautical miles to the coastline. The amendment was seen as a response to the Maryland Public Service Commission's approval of two wind farms off the coast of Ocean City, both of which were planned to be at least 17 miles from the shore; Harris claimed that the wind farms would be visible from the horizon and discourage tourism to Ocean City. He later called for the Ocean City wind farm project to be revisited, claiming that it would interfere with Coast Guard shipping channels and Department of Defense military communications. In 2023, after a dead humpback whale washed ashore Assateague Island, Harris called for a moratorium on wind farm construction, which he claimed without evidence was responsible for the whale's death.

In 2018, Harris said that he supported offshore drilling, but opposed offshore drilling off the coast of Maryland. In 2022, following a spike in gas prices as the result of the Russo-Ukrainian War, he said he supported restarting the Keystone pipeline to reduce gas prices. In 2023, Harris called for an increase in natural gas and coal production as a means to lower the national deficit and counter China's influence on global markets.

In 2019, Harris voted against rejoining the Paris Agreement. He also voted against the Coastal and Marine Economies Act, which would ban any new offshore drilling activity off the Pacific or Atlantic coasts.

Following the Francis Scott Key Bridge collapse in March 2024, Harris called on state and federal officials to "immediately reduce the environmental and regulatory burdens" that would hamper reconstruction of the bridge. In August 2025, after Trump threatened to withhold federal funding for the replacement of the Francis Scott Key Bridge, Harris said that the funding for the Key Bridge "might have to be reinvestigated, because it's a little unusual that we allowed 100% payment by the federal government". He also suggested that the state could afford to pay the remaining cost share not covered by the federal government, which would cost around $200 million, suggesting that state officials could divert money from lawsuits against the Trump administration to pay for the bridge replacement.

==== Gun rights ====
Harris opposes restrictions on the right to carry, but says that citizens who commit or threaten to commit a crime with a firearm should receive harsh sentences. In 2017, he voted for the Concealed Carry Reciprocity Act, a bill that would require all states recognize concealed carry permits issued by other states.

During the 2000 legislative session, Harris opposed legislation that would require handguns sold in Maryland to have integrated mechanical safety devices.

In January 2016, Harris said he supported a proposal by presidential candidate Donald Trump to eliminate gun-free zones at schools, arguing that gun-free zones led to an increase in school shootings. After the Sutherland Springs church shooting on November 5, 2017, Harris compared gun control efforts to Nazi gun control measures, saying "Jews were not allowed to own guns in Nazi Germany and that didn't end well". In 2018, Harris said he supported arming teachers.

In 2022, Harris voted against a bill to ban assault weapons.

==== Healthcare ====
Harris supports Maryland's "high-risk pool" healthcare system, voting in 2002 for a bill creating the health insurance pool.

Harris opposes the Affordable Care Act (ACA), which he has called a "government takeover of health care", and ran in 2010 on a promise to repeal it. During a town hall meeting in August 2013, he criticized the ACA's individual mandate and employer mandates, which he said encouraged businesses to increase part-time hiring. Harris also said he supported protecting health insurance access for individuals with pre-existing conditions as well as removing caps on insurance benefits. In December 2013, he proposed using sequestration to increase the amount states would need to pay to expand Medicaid by 10 percent.

In 2013, Harris introduced a bill that would repeal a provision of the ACA that required insurance companies to cover procedures performed by chiropractors, midwives, and similar medical staff. He also cosponsored the HIV Organ Policy Equity Act, a bill that allowed HIV-infected people to donate their organs to other HIV-infected people, which was signed into law by President Barack Obama in November 2013.

In 2014, Harris said he supported an U.S. Department of Health and Human Services probe into glitches with Maryland's health insurance exchange, which was among the worst performing in the nation. The probe, which concluded in March 2015, found that the state lacked oversight and internal controls that led to the state improperly spending $28.4 million in federal funding.

Harris was initially supportive of the American Health Care Act of 2017 (AHCA), which would have partially repealed the ACA. He later said he would vote against the AHCA following last-minute changes made to the bill that he said "simply won't lower premiums as much as the American people need". Harris dismissed Congressional Budget Office estimates that showed that eliminating cost-sharing subsidies would cause insurance premiums to grow 20 percent, calling it "another excuse by insurance companies to raise premiums". In May 2017, Harris voted for the AHCA.

In September 2017, Harris said he supported the Graham–Cassidy health care amendment, which would have returned control of Medicaid back to the states. In October 2017, he said he supported the Trump administration's decision to end federal subsidies to help low-income people pay for out-of-pocket expenses under ACA.

In 2018, Harris said he supported raising the full retirement age for Social Security from 67 to 70 years old. He also said he supported imposing work requirements on "able-bodied adults" for Medicaid and food stamps.

In 2019, Harris voted against the Never Forget the Heroes Act, a bill authorizing permanent health benefits for first responders during the September 11 attacks. In 2022, he voted against the Federal Firefighters Fairness Act, which would have eased the compensation claim process for federally employed firefighters diagnosed with mesothelioma.

==== Immigration ====
Harris does not support a path to citizenship for illegal immigrants, saying in August 2013 that "if you came here illegally, you should be very happy if what we do is just to allow you to remain and contribute to the economy illegally". He has also criticized amnesty as a "step back from the rule of law". Harris supports expanding H-2B visas for agricultural and seasonal industries as well as immigration policy of Donald Trump. In 2011, Harris co-signed a letter opposing a new U.S. Department of Labor rule to increase the hourly wages of H-2B visa workers.

In 2014, Harris said he supported instituting a travel ban on Ebola endemic areas.

In 2017, Harris said he supported Executive Order 13769, an executive order by President Donald Trump to temporarily suspend the United States Refugee Admissions Program and ban travel from six predominantly Muslim countries. He also supported the Trump administration's plan to phase out the Deferred Action for Childhood Arrivals program. In February 2019, he said he supported Trump's national emergency declaration to fund the construction of the Mexico–United States border wall, which he claimed would prevent drug trafficking, gang activity, and sexual violence. Later that year, Harris voted against blocking the emergency declaration and the American Dream and Promise Act, and voted for a bill to provide $4.6 billion in humanitarian aid for migrants at the Mexico–United States border.

In 2019, Harris criticized sanctuary city policies, saying that they "create an environment of the lack of rule of law".

In January 2026, Harris said he supported an independent investigation into the killing of Alex Pretti, but opposed involving any Minnesota officials in the investigation, saying that Minnesota governor Tim Walz and Minneapolis mayor Jacob Frey "have shown clear prejudice in the case".

In June 2026, Harris opposed the U.S. Supreme Court's decision in Trump v. Barbara, which upheld birthright citizenship under the Fourteenth Amendment to the United States Constitution, saying that the court "got it wrong" and that Congress should consider legislation to prohibit foreign nationals who come to the United States illegally for the purpose of having a child from being eligible for birthright citizenship.

==== LGBT rights ====
In 2001, Harris led a filibuster of a bill prohibiting discrimination against same-sex couples, which lasted more than two hours and ended after two-thirds of state senators voted to limit debate. He also unsuccessfully sought to amend the bill to allow people to discriminate on the basis of religion.

In 2006, Harris said he supported a proposed constitutional amendment to "protect marriage between a man and a woman", which he later cosponsored in 2013 and 2015.

Harris said he was disappointed with the U.S. Supreme Court's ruling in Obergefell v. Hodges, which legalized gay marriage throughout the United States. In October 2014, the Human Rights Campaign placed Harris on its list of the 14 most "anti-equality" House members, citing his support for several anti-LGBT bills including one prohibiting the use of Department of Defense property in gay marriages and another banning federal discrimination against people and organizations on the basis of religious beliefs. In 2015, he cosponsored a resolution disagreeing with the Supreme Court ruling in Obergefell.

In 2021, Harris voted against the Equality Act, a bill to add gender identity and sexual orientation to federal anti-discrimination laws. In 2022, he voted against the Respect for Marriage Act, which codified same-sex and interracial marriage rights. Nonetheless, Harris indicated unwillingness to actively campaign on the issue of opposing same-sex marriage, noting in an early 2026 statement, "I don’t think it’s being talked about widely now."

In 2023, Harris voted for the Protection of Women and Girls Sports Act, a bill to ban transgender women from competing in female sports. He also opposed a proposed U.S. Department of Education rule requiring elementary schools to allow students to participate in school sports programs based on their stated gender identity. In July 2023, Harris voted to strip funding for LGBTQ projects from the 2024 United States federal budget, comparing its funding to a hypothetical Ku Klux Klan project because the "LGBTQ center organized a protest against conservative mothers".

==== Marijuana ====
In January 2003, Harris said he opposed legalizing medical marijuana in Maryland, saying that he preferred that the issue be handled at the federal level.

In 2014, Harris was the leading congressional critic of marijuana decriminalization in the District of Columbia bill, and led efforts in Congress to block decriminalization from taking effect. Harris's amendment led to a call from D.C. mayor Vincent Gray to boycott tourism to Harris's district and the boycott of Maryland's 1st congressional district, as well as an online campaign requesting that D.C.-area businesses refuse him service. Washington D.C. officials and marijuana activists called Harris's actions unwarranted congressional interference.

In November 2014, D.C. residents voted to legalize recreational cannabis for adults, with 68% in favor. Despite this, Harris said he would use "all resources available to a member of Congress to stop this action". On December 9, 2014, congressional leaders announced a deal on a spending bill that included language that would prohibit the D.C. referendum from taking effect. Harris said that "the Constitution gives Congress the ultimate oversight about what happens in the federal district." He said he believes that cannabis is a gateway drug.

In 2022, Harris added a provision to the $1.5 trillion spending omnibus package that barred D.C. from legalizing, regulating and taxing the sale recreational cannabis, overriding the will of D.C. voters. Democrats opposed Harris's provision, but Republicans sharply opposed attempts to remove the provision. In February 2024, amid federal efforts to lower the drug designation of marijuana from a schedule 1 substance to a schedule 3, Harris wrote to the Food and Drug Administration criticizing the agency for not "sufficiently examining the effect of daily marijuana use" and the impact of marijuana use on driving, pregnant women, and children.

==== Social issues ====
In 2006, Harris voted in favor of a bill to legalize slot machine gambling in Maryland, but said he would only support a "limited plan" that required statewide and local referendums to legalize slots.

In April 2009, Harris led opposition to the scheduled screening of the pornographic film Pirates II: Stagnetti's Revenge at the University of Maryland, College Park, threatening to withhold state funding from the university if it showed the film. Following this threat, the university cancelled the screening of the film. After portions of the film were screened by students at the campus lecture hall, Harris unsuccessfully sought to amend the state budget to block funding for the University System of Maryland until it adopted a policy on showing pornographic material on campus, which was later watered down into a compromise requiring the university system to develop policies on what kind of films could be shown on campus, which he supported. In November 2009, the University System of Maryland Board of Regents unanimously voted against adopting a policy to restrict the screening of pornographic films on campus.

In 2010, Harris said he opposed the Park51 project, a proposal to build a mosque two blocks from the World Trade Center site of the September 11 attacks, calling it "blatantly disrespectful".

In 2016, Harris voted against renaming a post office in Winston-Salem, North Carolina after civil rights activist Maya Angelou, who he called a "communist sympathizer", citing her support for the Cuban Revolution.

In 2019, Harris voted against renewing the Violence Against Women Act.

In 2020, Harris voted against removing an expired congressional deadline for the adoption of the Equal Rights Amendment.

==== Veterans ====
The PACT Act which expanded Veterans Affairs benefits to veterans exposed to toxic chemicals during their military service, received a "nay" from Harris.

=== Governance ===
==== COVID-19 response ====
During the COVID-19 pandemic, Harris opposed prohibitions on indoor dining during the COVID-19 pandemic and stay-at-home orders, and was skeptical of face masks. In March 2020, he voted for, and later criticized, the CARES Act. On May 2, 2020, Harris addressed protesters in Salisbury attempting to pressure Maryland governor Larry Hogan to lift restrictions, saying, "I am a physician. Let me tell you something: It is safe to begin to reopen Maryland." Harris also called on the state to partially reopen areas with low cases of COVID-19 and to lift restrictions on "low-risk businesses", such as golf courses and small businesses. In February 2021, Harris cosponsored a bill that would block state or local governments from receiving federal COVID-19 relief funds if they enacted restrictions affecting small businesses.

In August 2020, Harris promoted the use of hydroxychloroquine to treat COVID-19, despite the lack of evidence for its effectiveness and the subsequent opposition from NIH and WHO to its use for the treatment of COVID-19 in hospitalized patients.

In December 2020, Harris voted against a measure to raise stimulus checks sent out under the Consolidated Appropriations Act, 2021 to $2,000 per individual. In February 2021, he voted against the American Rescue Plan Act of 2021.

Harris supported COVID-19 vaccination efforts, but opposed vaccine mandates. In March 2021, he led a letter to Acting United States secretary of health and human services Norris Cochran urging him to review the two-dose strategy used for Pfizer-BioNTech's and Moderna's COVID-19 vaccines, arguing that a single-dose plan would "save the lives of up to 40,000 American seniors". In July 2021, amid a surge in COVID-19 cases resulting from the delta variant, Harris urged constituents to get the COVID-19 vaccine.

==== Electoral reform ====
In 2004, Harris criticized a state plan to use electronic voting machines in the 2004 general election and introduced a bill requiring voting machines to print voters' choices onto a paper ballot. He later unsuccessfully sued to block the state from using electronic voting machines during the 2004 elections. In 2006, Harris again criticized the state for using electronic voting machines in its 2006 elections, claiming without evidence that it would lead to voter fraud and suggesting that Iraq and Afghanistan "had more secure elections than Maryland does".

In 2008, Harris supported a bill that would require voters to show proof of citizenship to participate in Maryland elections.

In 2018, Harris introduced the Protecting Election Systems from Foreign Control Act, which would ban state election boards from contracting with foreign election systems vendors.

In October 2024, Harris suggested that the North Carolina legislature should pre-emptively override the popular vote results in the presidential election and award its electors to Donald Trump because of the impact that Hurricane Helene had on Republican-leaning districts.

In June 2026, Harris co-sponsored a resolution to repeal the Seventeenth Amendment to the United States Constitution, which allows for the election of U.S. senators.

===== 2020 presidential election =====
In August 2020, Harris dismissed accusations that U.S. postmaster general Louis DeJoy was attempting to undercut mail-in balloting, which he called a "conspiracy theory". He said he opposed using universal mail-in ballots to conduct the 2020 presidential election, claiming without evidence that it would "result in people who aren't qualified to have ballots getting them and in some cases people who are qualified not getting them". Harris later voted against a bill to increase U.S. Postal Service funding by $25 billion to help the agency prepare for the election.

After Joe Biden won the 2020 presidential election and President Donald Trump refused to concede while making false claims of fraud, Harris defended Trump's efforts to overturn the election. Harris falsely claimed there were "large-scale voting irregularities" and "secret, unobserved vote counting in the swing states", and called on Attorney General William Barr to investigate "these crimes".

In December 2020, Harris was one of 126 Republican members of the House of Representatives to sign an amicus brief in support of Texas v. Pennsylvania, a lawsuit filed at the United States Supreme Court contesting the results of the 2020 presidential election. The Supreme Court declined to hear the case on the basis that Texas lacked standing under Article III of the Constitution to challenge the results of an election held by another state.

In July 2022, the United States House Select Committee on the January 6 Attack revealed that Harris was present at a White House meeting with Republican House members on December 21, 2020, to discuss a plan to "encourage members of the public to fight the outcome on January 6". He confirmed his attendance to this meeting during a debate in October 2022, during which he said he would "take the invitation again" and added that it was "not planning an insurrection". Harris also said that he accepted the results of the 2020 presidential election at the debate, and called for national voter ID laws.

In September 2022, Harris voted against the Electoral Count Reform and Presidential Transition Improvement Act of 2022, a bill that made multiple revisions to the voting, certification, counting, and transition process in wake of the January 6 United States Capitol attack.

==== Federal workers ====
In February 2025, Harris said he supported the laying off of thousands of federal civil service workers by Elon Musk's Department of Government Efficiency and the second Trump administration, telling constituents that reached out to him after being fired that Trump "was elected with a mandate to root out corruption and waste within the federal government". He also justified the furloughs in interviews by saying it would help cut the federal deficit and improve worker productivity, calling rulings allowing the voluntary resignation program to take effect a "great first step", and blaming "liberal politicians and pundits" for ginning up concerns about the mass layoffs.

==== Impeachments ====
On October 31, 2019, Harris voted with his fellow Republicans in opposition to a resolution outlining rules for then-ongoing impeachment inquiry against Donald Trump. On December 18, 2019, he voted against both articles of impeachment of the first impeachment of President Trump.

Harris was one of four representatives who did not cast a vote regarding the second impeachment of President Trump on January 13, 2021. He tweeted that he opposed it, calling it divisive and a waste of time, and that he needed to be in the operating room caring for patients. During the 117th United States Congress, Harris cosponsored two different resolutions to impeach President Joe Biden. He also cosponsored a resolutions to impeach Attorney General Merrick Garland and Secretary of State Antony Blinken, who he blamed for the United States' withdrawal from Afghanistan. Very early in the 118th Congress, Harris cosponsored a resolution to impeach Secretary of Homeland Security Alejandro Mayorkas.

==== Redistricting ====
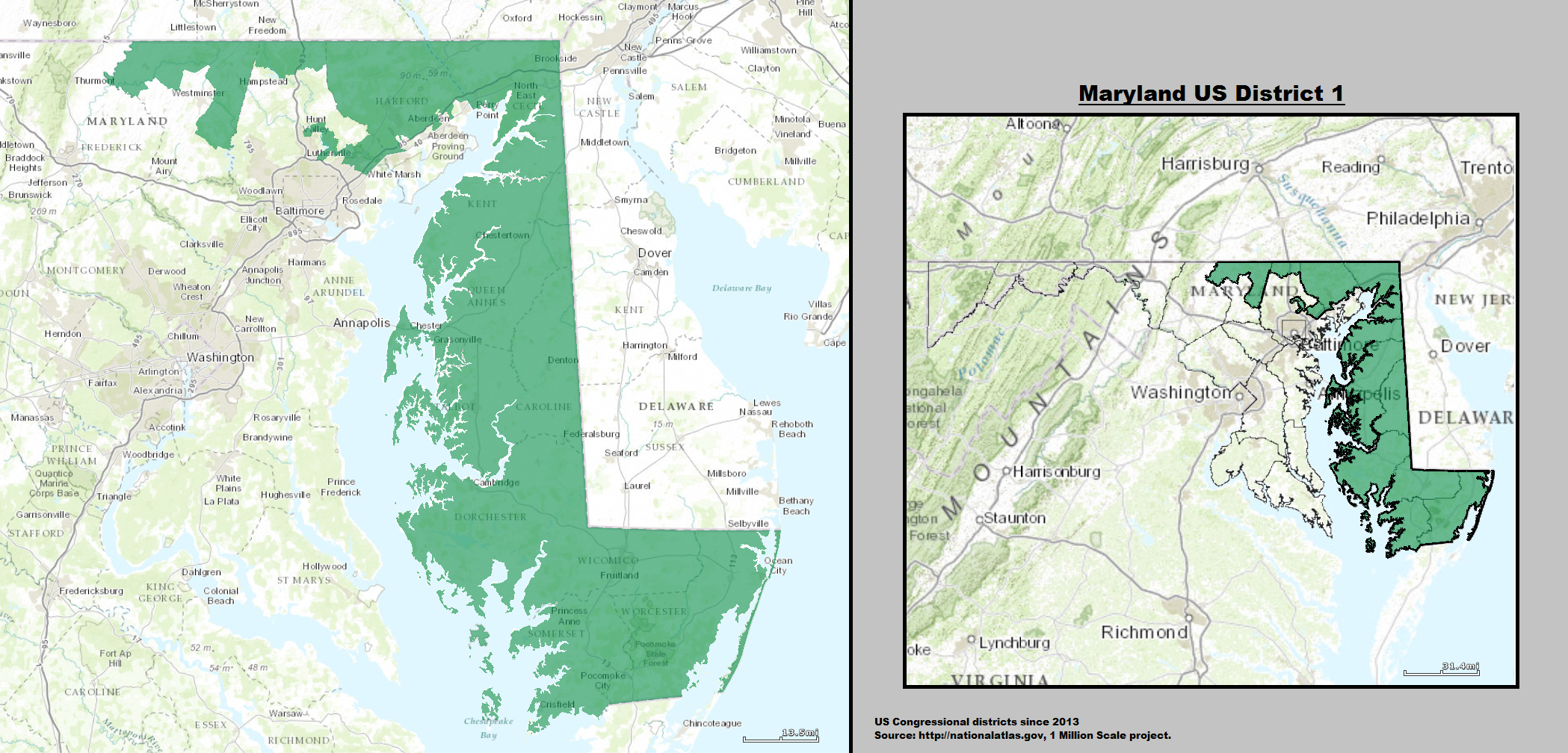
Maryland's 1st congressional district from 2013 to 2023

Harris supports using independent redistricting commissions to draw redistricting plans for federal offices, calling it the "biggest thing you could do to increase cooperation between the two parties". He has described himself as a beneficiary of gerrymandering, pointing to the 1st district's configuration as having been carved out to elect a Republican to Congress and get more Democrats elected elsewhere in Maryland. During his time in the Maryland Senate, Harris sought to pass legislation requiring Maryland to use an independent commission to redraw its districts.

During the 2020 redistricting cycle, the Maryland General Assembly redrew Maryland's congressional districts to make Maryland's 1st congressional district more competitive for Democrats by redrawing the 1st district from one that voted for Trump by 20 points to one where Biden slightly won in 2020, an effort that Harris opposed. He instead supported the maps drawn by Governor Larry Hogan's Maryland Citizens Redistricting Commission, an independent redistricting commission made up of three Democrats, Republicans, and Independent voters. In March 2022, Judge Lynne A. Battaglia struck down the Maryland General Assembly's new congressional districts as an "extreme partisan gerrymander", prompting legislators to pass a new congressional map that undid changes to make the 1st district more competitive.

In August 2025, amid Republican efforts to redraw Texas's congressional districts to gain five congressional seats in the 2026 United States House of Representatives elections, Harris challenged the Maryland General Assembly to redraw Maryland's congressional districts to make his district more favorable for Democrats, predicting that the map passed by the Democratic-controlled Maryland General Assembly would be overturned by the courts and result in more Republican members in Maryland's congressional delegation. After Governor Wes Moore said that he was considering doing so, Harris called the potential gerrymander "the most un-bipartisan thing you could do" and said that he was weighing his legal options against any new maps. In September 2026, after the Maryland General Assembly passed Question 3—which would exempt Maryland's congressional districts from guidelines in the Constitution of Maryland that require legislative districts to respect natural boundaries and the boundaries of political subdivisions if approved by voters—Harris criticized mid-decade redistricting as a "bad idea" that would hurt democracy.

==== Storming of the Capitol ====
In an interview with WBAL-TV just after evacuating the Capitol after it was stormed, Harris downplayed the violence of the riot, saying "Obviously, later we heard there was a gunshot, but other than that, there was no indication that this was a truly violent protest, as violent as one as you would worry about." Harris also said he understood the rioters' frustrations and repeated false claims of election fraud. During a debate in October 2022, he denied that the Capitol attack was an "insurrection", falsely stating that the only people who had weapons during the attack were Capitol police officers.

On January 6, 2021, after the 2021 storming of the United States Capitol, Harris had a verbal altercation with Representative Al Lawson on the House floor after taking offense at Representative Conor Lamb's criticism of House Republicans for pushing unfounded conspiracy theories. During an interview the next day, Harris falsely claimed that leftist provocateurs were behind the storming of the Capitol.

In May 2021, Harris voted against a measure creating the January 6 commission, calling it "another partisan stunt from Speaker Pelosi".

In June 2021, Harris was among 21 House Republicans to vote against a resolution to give the Congressional Gold Medal to police officers who defended the U.S. Capitol on January 6, which he had called a "stunt".

=== Foreign policy ===
Harris supports increasing federal defense funding to combat threats to national security. In 2013, he said he supported cuts to the U.S. Department of Education and the U.S. Environmental Protection Agency to support expanding the military.

In 2015, Harris voted against the Trade Promotion Authority. In 2019, he voted for the United States–Mexico–Canada Agreement, a successor to NAFTA.

==== Alberta ====
In 2026, Harris supported Alberta separating from Canada, and Alberta becoming the 51st State.

==== Hungary ====
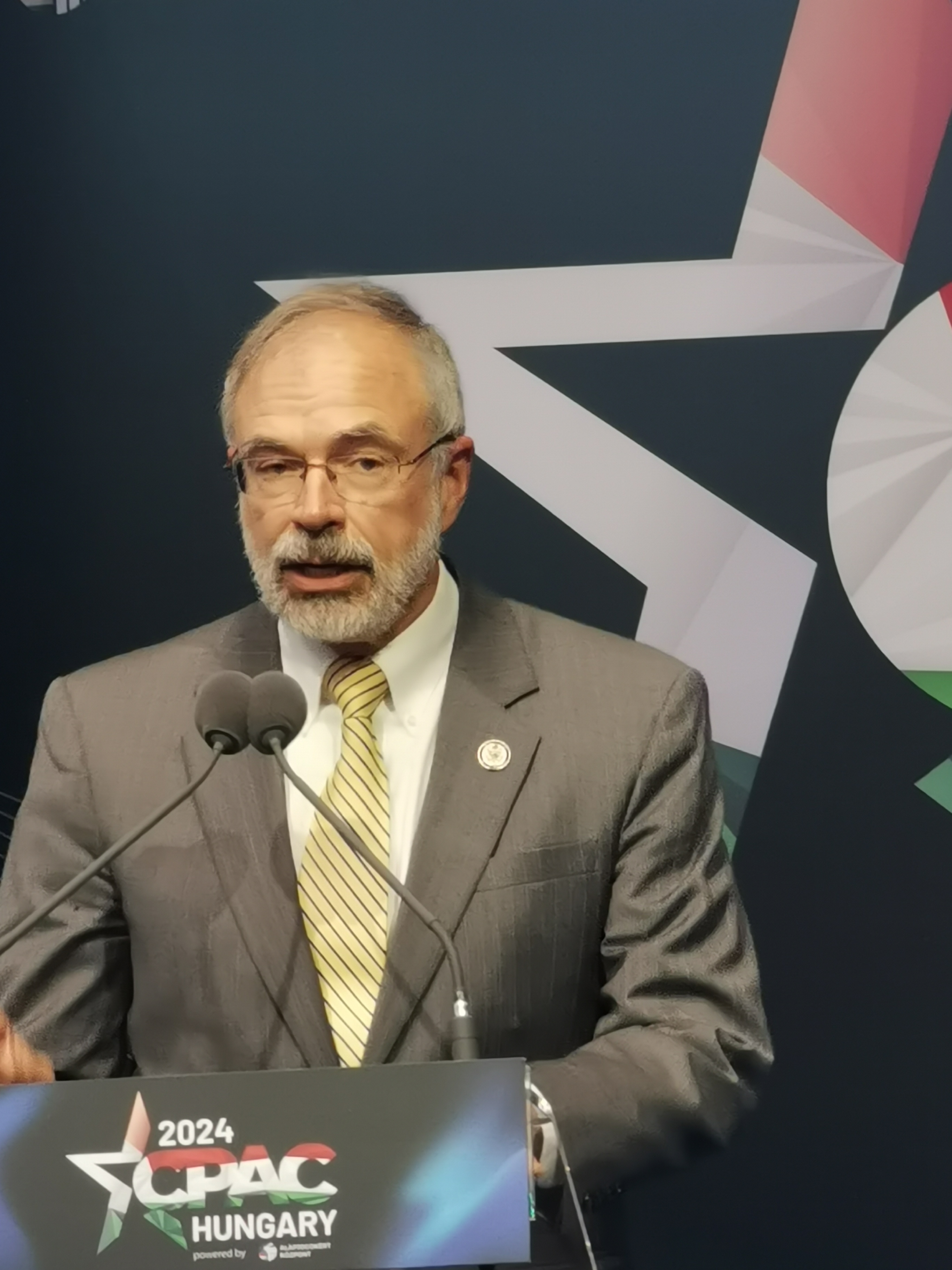
Speaking at CPAC Hungary 2024

In 2018, Harris led a letter opposing a U.S. State Department plan to provide $700,000 for independent media in Hungary, which he charged as having "distorted the record" of Hungarian prime minister Viktor Orbán. In 2022, he praised Orbán's leadership in a speech at the Conservative Political Action Conference in Hungary. In 2022, Harris was one of 63 Republicans to vote against a nonbinding resolution to support NATO, which he later defended by saying that the military alliance had "unfairly criticized the governments of Hungary and Poland", both of which are members of NATO.

==== Iran ====
In 2015, Harris said he opposed the Iran Nuclear Deal, which he said would go toward buying "weapons that will end up killing Americans at some point in the future". He later called for increased sanctions on Iran, including a ban on any nuclear enrichment in the country. In June 2025, Harris supported the American strikes on Iranian nuclear sites, saying that a "nuclear-armed Iran endangers America, Israel, and the entire free world". In February 2026, he supported further U.S. and Israeli strikes on Iran, saying they followed stalled negotiations over Iran's nuclear program and were necessary to prevent Iran from developing nuclear weapons.

==== Israel ====
Harris supports Israel's right to defend itself and the Abraham Accords. He has criticized the European Union for funding what he called "illegal building" by the Palestinian National Authority in the Judea and Samaria Area, and suggested in December 2022 that the United States should provide funding to Israel for developing infrastructure in these areas. In November 2023, amid the Gaza war, Harris said he opposed providing humanitarian aid to Palestine and criticized the Biden administration for "interfering" with Israel's handling of the war.

==== Libya ====
In 2011, Harris voted to end the U.S. military presence in Libya and to limit the use of funds supporting NATO operations in Libya.

==== Myanmar ====
In 2021, Harris was one of 14 Republican representatives to vote against a measure condemning the Myanmar coup d'état.

==== Russia ====
In October 2026, amid rising diesel prices as a result of the 2026 Iran war, Harris opposed the United States–Russia oil deal and falsely blamed Democratic environmental policy for the diesel price spikes.

==== Syria ====
In 2013, Harris said he opposed the American-led intervention in the Syrian civil war. In 2014, after the Obama administration carried out over 150 airstrikes on the Islamic State in Syria, he called for a new authorization vote on the U.S.-led intervention.

In April 2017, Harris said he supported the Trump administration's decision to launch airstrikes against the Syrian airfield believed to be responsible for the Khan Shaykhun chemical attack. He also supported the April 2018 missile strikes against Syria following the Douma chemical attack.

In 2019, Harris raised concerns over President Trump's withdrawal of troops from the Turkey-Syria border, but ultimately voted against condemning the withdrawal. In 2023, he was among 47 Republicans to vote in favor of H.Con.Res. 21, which directed President Joe Biden to remove U.S. troops from Syria within 180 days.

==== Turkey ====
In 2019, Harris was one of 16 House members to vote against imposing sanctions against Turkey for its invasion of northern Syria, and one of 11 House members to vote against recognizing the Armenian genocide.

==== Ukraine ====
Harris is supportive of congressional efforts to provide Ukraine with various forms of aid amid the Russo–Ukrainian War. In April 2022, he co-signed a letter to President Joe Biden urging him to extend temporary protected status to Ukrainian refugees who sought to enter the United States.

During a town hall meeting in August 2023, Harris suggested that the U.S. should begin winding down on aid to Ukraine and negotiating for the end of the war, pointing to the national deficit and the 2023 Ukrainian counteroffensive, which he deemed to be a failure.

==== Venezuela ====
In December 2025, Harris supported U.S. military strikes on alleged drug traffickers in the Caribbean Sea. He praised the 2026 United States strikes in Venezuela and subsequent capture of Venezuelan president Nicolás Maduro, saying that "thousands of innocent American lives will be saved by President Trump's decision to seize and arrest Maduro".

=== Roy Moore ===
During the primary race of the 2017 special election to fill the Senate seat formerly held by Jeff Sessions, Harris endorsed Roy Moore in his primary campaign against the incumbent, Luther Strange. Following the news of sexual misconduct allegations against Moore, Harris said Moore should withdraw from the race if the allegations were true.

== Electoral history ==
Year	Office	Election	Subject	Party	Votes	%	Opponent	Party	Votes	%	Opponent	Party	Votes	%			
1998	Maryland Senate, District 9	General	Andy Harris	Republican	24,814	61%	Anthony O. Blades	Democratic	15,780	39%							
2002	Maryland Senate, District 7	General	Andy Harris	Republican	23,374	57.8%	Dianne DeCarlo	Democratic	16,991	42.1%	Write-ins		44	0.1%			
2006	Maryland Senate, District 7	General	Andy Harris	Republican	23,453	56.6%	Patricia A. Foerster	Democratic	17,972	43.3%	Write-ins		35	0.1%			
2008	U.S. House of Representatives, MD-1	Primary	Andy Harris	Republican	33,627	43.4%	Wayne Gilchrest	Republican	25,624	33.1%	E.J. Pipkin	Republican	15,700	20.3%			
2008	U.S. House of Representatives, MD-1	General	Frank Kratovil	Democratic	177,065	49.1%	Andy Harris	Republican	174,213	48.3%	Richard James Davis	Libertarian	8,873	2.5%	Write-ins	35	0.1%
2010	U.S. House of Representatives, MD-1	General	Andy Harris	Republican	155,118	54.1%	Frank Kratovil	Democratic	120,400	42.0%	Richard James Davis	Libertarian	10,876	3.8%	Write-ins	418	0.15%
2012	U.S. House of Representatives, MD-1	General	Andy Harris	Republican	212,204	63.4%	Wendy Rosen	Democratic	92,812	27.5%	Muir Wayne Boda	Libertarian	12,857	3.8%	Write-ins	17,887	5.3%
2014	U.S. House of Representatives, MD-1	General	Andy Harris	Republican	176,342	70.4%	Bill Tilghman	Democratic	73,843	29.5%	Write-ins		233	0.1%			
2016	U.S. House of Representatives, MD-1	General	Andy Harris	Republican	242,574	67.0%	Joe Werner	Democratic	103,622	28.6%	Matt Beers	Libertarian	15,370	4.2%	Write-ins	531	0.1%
2018	U.S. House of Representatives, MD-1	General	Andy Harris	Republican	183,662	60.0%	Jesse Colvin	Democratic	116,631	38.1%	Jenica Martin	Libertarian	5,744	1.9%	Write-ins	149	0.0%
2020	U.S. House of Representatives, MD-1	General	Andy Harris	Republican	250,901	63.4%	Mia Mason	Democratic	143,877	36.4%	Write-ins		746	0.2%			
2022	U.S. House of Representatives, MD-1	General	Andy Harris	Republican	159,673	54.4%	Heather Mizeur	Democratic	126,511	43.1%	Daniel Frank Thibeault	Libertarian	6,924	2.4%	Write-ins	250	0.1%
2024	U.S. House Of Representatives, MD-1	General	Andy Harris	Republican	246,356	59.4%	Blane H. Miller, III	Democratic	154,585	37.4%	Joshua W. O'Brien	Libertarian	12,664	3.1%	Write-ins	675	0.2%

== Personal life ==
Harris was married for 30 years to Sylvia "Cookie" Harris, who died of a heart attack on August 28, 2014. They had five children. In July 2017, he married Nicole Beus, a Baltimore County political and marketing consultant who was the chair of the Maryland Republican Party from 2022 to 2026.

Harris lives in Cambridge on the Eastern Shore, having previously lived in Cockeysville, a suburb of Baltimore. He considered himself a "citizen-legislator," having maintained his medical practice while in the State Senate.

In December 2025, Harris was treated at a hospital after an "episode of dizziness" nine days after getting hip surgery.

=== 2021 gun incident ===
On January 21, 2021, Harris tried to enter the House floor with a gun, setting off a metal detector. This was in violation of new security measures adopted after the storming of the U.S. Capitol. Harris was not allowed to enter and returned 10 minutes later without a gun, at which point he was allowed entry. U.S. Capitol Police began an investigation into the incident.

=== Ivermectin prescriptions ===
In October 2021, Harris said on a radio show he prescribed ivermectin to constituents for treatment of COVID-19. Ivermectin is used to treat parasites in livestock and river blindness in humans. It is not approved by the FDA for treatment of COVID-19. During a discussion of vaccine mandates by the House Freedom Caucus in November 2021, Harris said that a complaint was filed against him with a physicians board for prescribing ivermectin.

== See also ==
- Physicians in the United States Congress

U.S. House of Representatives
Preceded by Frank Kratovil	Member of the U.S. House of Representatives from Maryland's 1st congressional district 2011–present	Incumbent
Party political offices
Preceded by Bob Good	Chair of the House Freedom Caucus; 2024–present	Incumbent
U.S. order of precedence (ceremonial)
Preceded by Morgan Griffith	United States representatives by seniority 83rd	Succeeded by Bill Huizenga
