= Wayne Gilchrest =

American politician (born 1946)

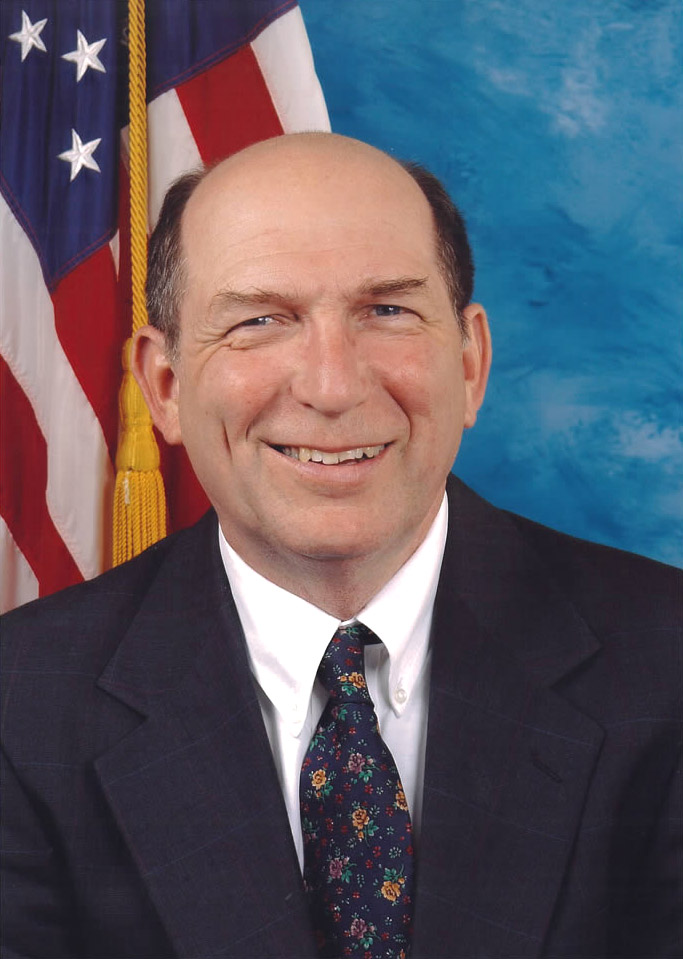

Member of the U.S. House of Representatives from Maryland's 1st district
- In office January 3, 1991 – January 3, 2009
- Preceded by: Roy Dyson
- Succeeded by: Frank Kratovil

Personal details
- Born: Wayne Thomas Gilchrest; April 15, 1946 (age 80) Rahway, New Jersey, U.S.
- Party: Republican (before 2019); Democratic (2019–present)
- Spouse: Barbara Gilchrest
- Education: Wesley College (AA); Delaware State University (BA); Loyola University Maryland

Military service
- Allegiance: United States
- Branch/service: United States Marine Corps
- Years of service: 1964–1968
- Rank: Sergeant
- Unit: 3rd Battalion, 6th Marines; 2nd Battalion, 1st Marines
- Battles/wars: Vietnam War
- Awards: Purple Heart; Bronze Star; Navy Commendation Medal
- Gilchrest's voice Gilchrest supporting the 1991 AUMF Against Iraq. Recorded January 11, 1991

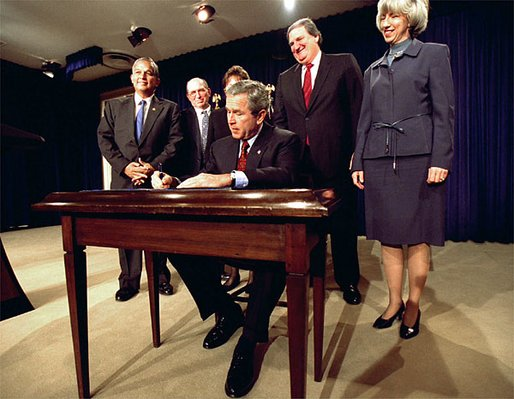
Rep. Gilchrest (second from left) and others join President George W. Bush for the signing of the North American Wetlands Conservation Reauthorization Act.

Wayne Thomas Gilchrest (born April 15, 1946) is an American politician who served as a Republican member of the United States House of Representatives representing Maryland's 1st congressional district. In 2008, Gilchrest was defeated in the Republican primary by State Senator Andy Harris. Following his departure from politics he has worked on environmental education. He is also a member of the ReFormers Caucus of Issue One. In 2019, Gilchrest became a registered Democrat.

== Early life and education ==
Born in Rahway, New Jersey, Gilchrest was the fourth child of Elizabeth and Arthur Gilchrest's six boys. After graduating high school in 1964, he joined the United States Marine Corps. His tour of duty saw action during the invasion of the Dominican Republic, and later the Vietnam War. He earned the rank of Sergeant in Vietnam where, as a platoon leader, he was wounded in the chest. Gilchrest was decorated with the Purple Heart, Bronze Star, and Navy Commendation Medal. He is a member of the American Legion, Veterans of Foreign Wars, and Military Order of the Purple Heart.

In 1969, he received an associate's degree from Wesley College in Dover, Delaware. He then spent a semester in Kentucky studying rural poverty in Appalachia. He went on to receive a bachelor's degree in history from Delaware State College in 1973. Since then, he has done some work towards a master's degree at Loyola College in Baltimore.

== Career ==
While teaching at Kent County High School on the Eastern Shore of Maryland, Gilchrest ran against four-term 1st District Democratic incumbent Roy Dyson in 1988. Dyson was plagued by allegations of improper contributions from defense contractors, questions about his sexual orientation, and the suicide of his top staffer. Despite being badly outspent, Gilchrest lost narrowly to Dyson. He sought a rematch in 1990; this time soundly beating Dyson by 14%. In 1992, he survived a close contest against Tom McMillen, who had represented the 4th District before being drawn into the 1st District. Gilchrest won by only 3%, largely by swamping McMillen on the Eastern Shore. He wouldn't face serious opposition again for over a decade.

Gilchrest broke ranks with his party more often than any other House member in 2007. While Democrats and Republicans were nearly tied in registration in 2006 (183,332 Democrats to 180,856 Republicans), the district had a strong tinge of social conservatism that usually favored Republicans. The 1st had a Cook Partisan Voting Index rating of R+13, indicating that it was a strongly Republican district, and supported President Bush's re-election with over 60% of the vote.

Gilchrest was a member of many moderate Republican groups such as the Republican Main Street Partnership, Republicans for Environmental Protection, and the Republican Majority For Choice. He was also the co-chairman of the Congressional Climate Change Caucus together with Democrat John Olver (MA-1). Gilchrest was a Republican co-sponsor of Rep. Marty Meehan's "Military Readiness Enhancement Act" which would have repealed the "Don't ask, don't tell" policy. Gilchrest also spoke in favor of same-sex marriage while the Maryland Legislature was considering legalizing it, calling same-sex marriage a matter of "social justice, civil rights and a more viable democracy."

In 1993, Gilchrest was the lone Republican vote in support of a bill that would have created DC Statehood. Aside from his socially liberal stance, Gilchrest has drawn attention for his stance on the Iraq War. Though he initially supported the war, Gilchrest's support waned as the occupation became increasingly violent, expressing his support for the Iraq Study Group Report and called on setting a timetable for withdrawal from Iraq. Gilchrest also joined 16 Republicans and 229 Democrats voting in favor of House Concurrent Resolution (H.CON.RES) 63, a non-binding resolution expressing disapproval for the Iraq War troop surge of 2007.

=== 2008 election ===
2008 Republican primary results by county: Harris: 40–50%; 50–60%; 60–70%; Gilchrist: 30–40%; 40–50%; 50–60%; 60–70%; Thomas: 30–40%

Gilchrest's moderate voting record resulted in vigorous primary challenges from Republicans who considered him a Republican in Name Only. However, none were successful until 2008. That year, State Senator Andrew Harris, State Senator E. J. Pipkin, Joe Arminio, and Robert Banks challenged Gilchrest in the 2008 Republican primary. Harris was strongly supported by the Club for Growth.

Harris defeated Gilchrest in the Republican primary, with Pipkin finishing third. After Gilchrest's loss in the primary, he broke with his party and endorsed Queen Anne's County State's Attorney Frank Kratovil, the Democratic nominee, in the general election, being quoted as saying, "Let's see, the Republican Party, or my eternal soul?" and "Party loyalty, or integrity?" when questioned. Kratovil won the election.

On September 18, 2008, Gilchrest made radio comments praising the Democratic Presidential ticket of Barack Obama and Joe Biden, causing some media outlets to claim his endorsement of the Democratic ticket. However, Gilchrest quickly clarified these comments, saying that they did not amount to an endorsement. Despite the fact that he did not officially endorse Obama, in an October 2 Washington Post article, Gilchrest sharply criticized his own party and their presidential nominee, fellow Vietnam veteran John McCain. Gilchrest said that the Republican party "has become more narrow, more self-serving, more centered around 'I want, I want, I want.'" and said that McCain "recites memorized pieces of information in a narrow way, whereas Barack Obama is constantly evaluating information, using his judgment. One guy just recites what's in front of him, and the other has initiative and reason and prudence and wisdom." Gilchrest later told WBAL-TV that he voted for Obama in the November election.

Gilchrest was ranked as the House's most liberal Republican in 2008 (his final term) by the National Journal, placing him to the left of 8 House Democrats.

=== Committee and caucus membership ===
- Committee on Natural Resources
  - Subcommittee on Fisheries, Wildlife and Oceans (Chairman 2001–2007)
- Committee on Transportation and Infrastructure
  - Subcommittee on Coast Guard and Maritime Transportation
  - Subcommittee on Railroads, Pipelines, and Hazardous Materials
  - Subcommittee on Water Resources and Environment
- Founder and Co-chair of the Chesapeake Bay Watershed Task Force
- Co-founder and Co-chair of the Congressional Climate Change Caucus
- Co-chair of the House Oceans Caucus
- Chairman of the House Corps Reform Caucus
- Co-founder and Co-chair of the House Organic Caucus
- Co-founder and Co-chair of the House Dialogue Caucus
- Board member of the National Iranian American Council (NIAC).

== Election history ==
| Year | Office | Election | Subject | Party | Votes | % | Opponent | Party | Votes | % |
|---|---|---|---|---|---|---|---|---|---|---|
| 1990 | Congress, 1st district | General | Wayne Gilchrest | Republican | 88,920 | 56.84 | Roy Dyson | Democratic | 67,518 | 43.16 |
| 1992 | Congress, 1st district | General | Wayne Gilchrest | Republican | 120,084 | 51.27 | Tom McMillen | Democratic | 112,771 | 48.15 |
| 1994 | Congress, 1st district | General | Wayne Gilchrest | Republican | 120,975 | 67.65 | Ralph Gies | Democratic | 57,712 | 32.27 |
| 1996 | Congress, 1st district | General | Wayne Gilchrest | Republican | 131,033 | 61.55 | Steven Eastaugh | Democratic | 81,825 | 38.44 |
| 1998 | Congress, 1st district | General | Wayne Gilchrest | Republican | 135,771 | 69.19 | Irving Pinder | Democratic | 60,450 | 30.81 |
| 2000 | Congress, 1st district | General | Wayne Gilchrest | Republican | 165,293 | 64.4 | Bennett Bozman | Democratic | 91,022 | 35.46 |
| 2002 | Congress, 1st district | General | Wayne Gilchrest | Republican | 192,004 | 76.67 | Ann Tamlyn | Democratic | 57,986 | 23.16 |
| 2004 | Congress, 1st district | General | Wayne Gilchrest | Republican | 245,149 | 75.77 | Kostas Alexakis | Democratic | 77,872 | 24.07 |
| 2006 | Congress, 1st district | General | Wayne Gilchrest | Republican | 185,353 | 68.80 | Jim Corwin | Democratic | 83,817 | 31.11 |
| 2008 | Congress, 1st district | Primary | Wayne Gilchrest | Republican | 23,797 | 33.08 | Andy Harris | Republican | 31,180 | 43.34 |

U.S. House of Representatives
| Preceded by Roy Dyson | Member of the U.S. House of Representatives from Maryland's 1st congressional district 1991–2009 | Succeeded by Frank Kratovil |
U.S. order of precedence (ceremonial)
| Preceded by John F. Tierney as Former U.S. Representative | Order of precedence of the United States as Former U.S. Representative | Succeeded by John Sarbanes as Former U.S. Representative |
