= Frank Kratovil =

American politician (born 1968)

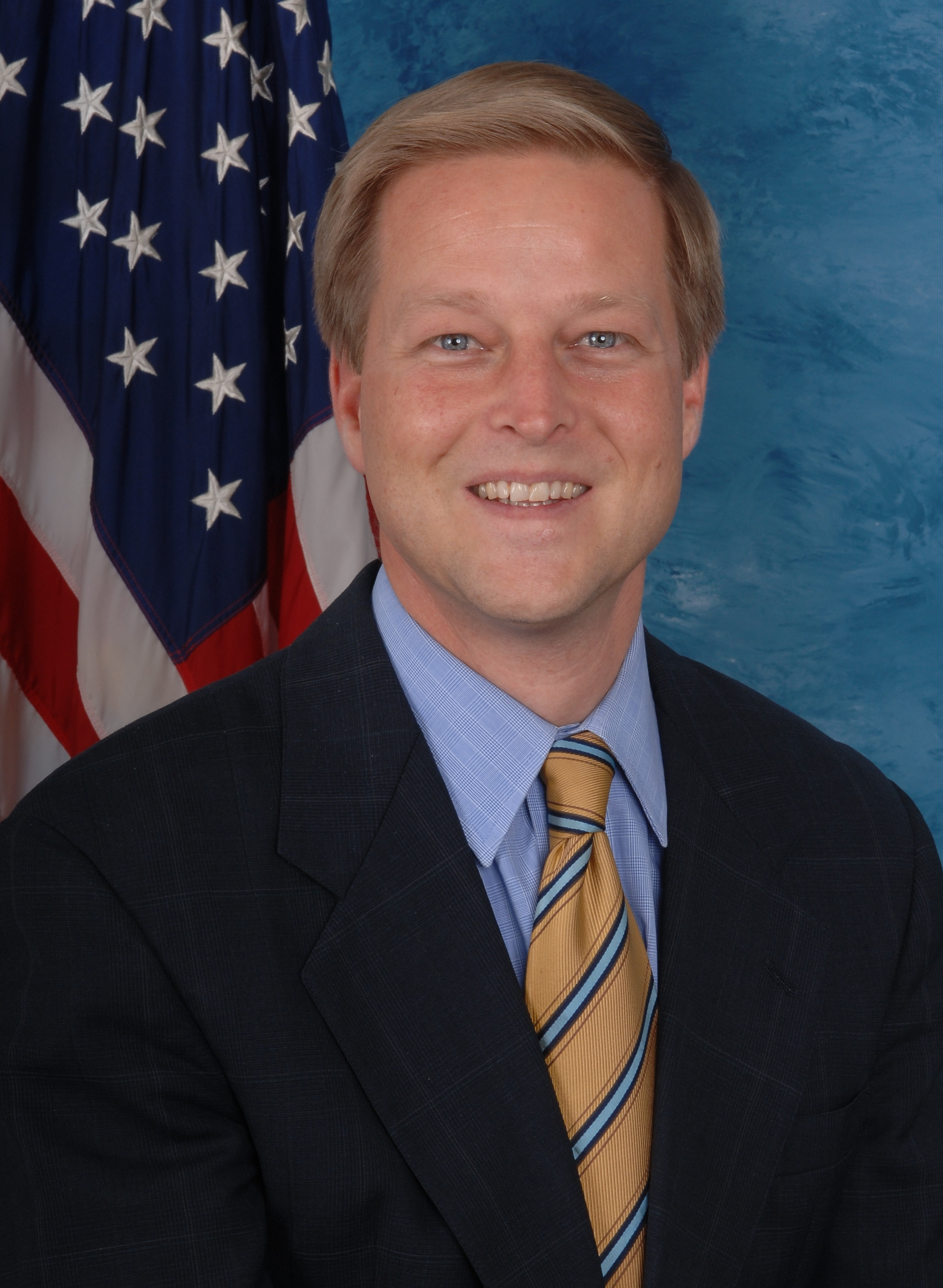
- Official portrait, 2008

Member of the U.S. House of Representatives from Maryland's 1st district
- In office January 3, 2009 – January 3, 2011
- Preceded by: Wayne Gilchrest
- Succeeded by: Andy Harris

State's Attorney of Queen Anne's County
- In office January 2003 – January 3, 2009
- Preceded by: David Gregory
- Succeeded by: Lance Richardson

Personal details
- Born: Frank Michael Kratovil Jr. May 29, 1968 (age 58) Lanham, Maryland, U.S.
- Party: Democratic
- Spouse: Kimberly Kratovil (m. 1992)
- Children: 5
- Education: McDaniel College (BA); University of Baltimore (JD)

Frank Michael Kratovil Jr. (KRAT-uh-vil; born May 29, 1968) is an American politician who was the U.S. representative for Maryland's 1st congressional district from 2009 to 2011. Elected in 2008, he was defeated in his bid for reelection on November 2, 2010. Kratovil is a member of the Democratic Party. He previously served as State's Attorney of Queen Anne's County on Maryland's Eastern Shore, and he was appointed as a judge for the District Court of Maryland for Queen Anne's County by Governor Martin O'Malley in December 2011.

== Early life, education and career ==
Frank Kratovil was born in Lanham, Maryland, and spent his childhood in Prince George's County, Maryland. The son of Frank M. Kratovil Sr. and Lynnda Kratovil, he attended high school at Queen Anne School in Upper Marlboro and graduated in 1986. Kratovil received his bachelor's degree in 1990 from Western Maryland College. He joined Phi Delta Theta while there and played soccer, basketball and baseball. In soccer, he served as Captain for three years, was named to the Middle-Atlantic Conference All-Conference Team and received the Most Valuable Offensive Player Award and the Homer Earl Outstanding Player Award. Upon graduation, he was awarded the Bates Prize for the Most Outstanding Graduating Male, the Charles W. Havens Award, awarded to an intercollegiate athlete who "has shown by word and deeds the attributes of charity, altruism, benevolence, and a humane and compassionate concern for his fellow man", and the Carroll County Scholar-Athlete Award. Kratovil then graduated with honors from the University of Baltimore School of Law in 1994. He served from 1994 to 1995 as Law Clerk for Judge Darlene G. Perry of Prince George's County Circuit Court. From 1995 to 1997 he served as Assistant State's Attorney for Prince George's County, Maryland.

In 1997, Kratovil moved to the Eastern Shore and was appointed Assistant State's Attorney for Queen Anne's County, Maryland. During his tenure as Assistant State's Attorney he served as the county's only full-time Prosecutor and Community Prosecutor. He continued to serve as Assistant State's Attorney until 2001 when he was appointed as Deputy State's Attorney in Kent County, Maryland. He also served as the President of the Young Democrats of Maryland from 1997 to 1998, and in 1998 was selected to represent the United States on the American Council of Young Political Leaders' delegation to Taiwan. He was also a member and on the executive committee of the Queen Anne's County local management board.

== Queen Anne's County State's Attorney ==
In 2002, Kratovil ran for the office of State's Attorney in Queen Anne's County and was elected after defeating four-term incumbent David Gregory in the primary and Republican Paul W. Comfort in the general election. Kratovil received nearly 60% of the vote while Robert Ehrlich, the Republican candidate for governor, received over 74%. Kratovil assumed office at the age of 34, making him the youngest State's Attorney in Maryland. He ran unopposed for re-election in 2006. He was elected by his fellow State's Attorneys to be President of the Maryland State's Attorneys' Association (MDSAA) for 2005. During his time as president of the MDSAA, he pushed for stronger legislation to expand prosecution of gangs and increased awareness of growing problems with drugs and gangs in Maryland's rural areas.

== U.S. House of Representatives ==
=== Elections ===
==== 2008 ====
On June 4, 2007, Kratovil announced that he would run for Congress in Maryland's 1st congressional district. During the February 12 primary, Kratovil defeated fellow Democrats Christopher Robinson, Steve Harper, and Joseph Werner.

Kratovil expected to face nine-term Republican incumbent Wayne Gilchrest, a leading Republican moderate, in the general election. However, Gilchrest was ousted in the Republican primary by a considerably more conservative Republican, State Senator Andy Harris. This significantly changed the race, as Kratovil was now running for an open seat rather than against a long-term incumbent.

Kratovil was initially a heavy underdog due to the district's election history. Although Democrats and Republicans were nearly tied in registration, the district has a strong tinge of social conservatism that had given Republicans an advantage for most of the time since the end of World War II. It had been in Republican hands for all but 14 years since 1947, although Kratovil received a significant boost when Gilchrest endorsed him over Harris. In June, the Democratic Congressional Campaign Committee (DCCC) decided to back Kratovil's campaign financially through their Red to Blue program. Kratovil, who is considered a moderate, picked up a number of endorsements from local Eastern Shore Republicans as well as Democrats. He also received an endorsement from the Blue Dog Coalition, a group of fiscally conservative congressional Democrats. CQ Politics designated the race as "No Clear Favorite."

The November 4 election was close, as expected. On election night, Kratovil led Harris by 915 votes. After two rounds of counting absentee ballots, Kratovil's lead grew to 2,000 votes. Forecasting it would be nearly impossible for Harris to close the gap, most media outlets declared Kratovil the winner on the night of November 7. Harris finally conceded on November 11.

Kratovil's election dramatized the geographic split that characterizes the 1st District. An Eastern Shore resident, Kratovil carried all nine counties on the Shore. However, he lost badly in the district's portion of Baltimore County, including most of Harris' base in Baltimore's more conservative eastern suburbs. He also lost the district's portions of Harford and Anne Arundel counties on the Western Shore. The district's voters are split almost evenly between the two regions. Kratovil therefore became only the third Democrat to represent the 1st since 1947, and the first since Gilchrest ousted Roy Dyson in 1990. John McCain carried the district with nearly 60 percent of the vote, which was his best showing in the state.

==== 2010 ====
Harris announced in May 2009 that he would seek a rematch against Kratovil, citing Kratovil's vote for the American Recovery and Reinvestment Act of 2009 in its final form.

Kratovil based his 2010 re-election bid on his independent streak in Washington. He was quoted as saying, "We can send someone to Washington who is going to continue to be independent and put the interests of the people of his district first, or we can send people that are going to put their own extreme ideological views ahead of the best interests of the people of this district." He also pointed to his overall record in Congress as proof. He was ranked as being in the top ten of independent voting records in Congress by Congressional Quarterly in 2009.

A Super PAC called The Concerned Taxpayers of America paid $150,000 for ads attacking Kratovil, and $300,000 for ads attacking Peter DeFazio of Oregon. Mid-October 2010 quarterly FEC filings showed that the group was solely funded by $300,000 from Daniel G. Schuster Inc., a concrete firm in Owings Mills, Maryland, and $200,000 from New York hedge fund executive Robert Mercer, the co-head of Renaissance Technologies of Setauket, New York. According to Dan Eggen at The Washington Post, the group said "it was formed in September 'to engage citizens from every walk of life and political affiliation' in the fight against 'runaway spending.'" Its only expenditures were for these ads. Schuster was the top contributor to Harris.

Kratovil was defeated, taking 42 percent of the vote to Harris' 54 percent. He is one of only three Democrats since 1992 to win 40 percent or more of the district's vote.

=== Tenure ===
Kratovil aligned himself with the conservative House Blue Dog Coalition. Despite the conservative bent of the 1st, he still supported many Democratic priorities. An analysis conducted by The Washington Post and others found Kratovil voted with the House Democratic Leadership 85% of the time. Major Democratic priorities Kratovil voted for included:

- The American Clean Energy and Security Act
- The Don't Ask, Don't Tell Repeal Act of 2010
- The Lilly Ledbetter Fair Pay Act of 2009
- The Children's Health Insurance Program Reauthorization Act
- The American Recovery and Reinvestment Act of 2009
- The Statutory Pay-As-You-Go Act of 2010
- The Dodd–Frank Wall Street Reform and Consumer Protection Act
- The Fair Sentencing Act of 2010
- The Employee Free Choice Act
- The Employment Non-Discrimination Act

An analysis of major legislation only by Congressional Quarterly and Centerline.org concluded Kratovil was one of the most centrist congressmen in the country. Kratovil voted against the Patient Protection and Affordable Care Act in both November 2009 and March 2010, citing his district's overwhelming opposition to it and "the overall cost, the deficit impact, and the negative impact that the bill's employer mandates could have on job creation."

=== Committee assignments ===
For the 111th Congress:

- Committee on Agriculture
  - Subcommittee on Conservation, Credit, Energy, and Research
  - Subcommittee on Horticulture and Organic Agriculture
  - Subcommittee on Livestock, Dairy, and Poultry
- Committee on Armed Services
  - Subcommittee on Air and Land Forces
  - Subcommittee on Readiness
- Committee on Natural Resources
  - Subcommittee on Insular Affairs, Oceans and Wildlife

== Electoral history ==
Year	Office	Election	Subject	Party	Votes	%	Opponent	Party	Votes	%	Opponent	Party	Votes	%	Opponent	Party	Votes	%
2002	Queen Anne's County State's Attorney	General	Frank Kratovil	Democratic	9,169	57.23%	Paul W. Comfort	Republican	6,830	42.63%								
2006	Queen Anne's County State's Attorney	General	Frank Kratovil	Democratic	13,894	100%												
2008	U.S. House, Maryland's 1st district	Primary	Frank Kratovil	Democratic	28,566	40.2%	Christopher Robinson	Democratic	21,892	30.8%	Steve Harper	Democratic	11,904	16.7%	Joseph Werner	Democratic	8,753	12.3%
2008	U.S. House, Maryland's 1st district	General	Frank Kratovil	Democratic	177,065	49.1%	Andy Harris	Republican	174,213	48.3%	Richard James Davis	Libertarian	8,873	2.5%	Write-ins		35	0.1%
2010	U.S. House, Maryland's 1st district	General	Frank Kratovil	Democratic	120,400	42.0%	Andy Harris	Republican	155,118	54.1%	Richard James Davis	Libertarian	10,876	3.8%	Write-ins		418	0.15%

== Judicial career ==
In late December 2011, Maryland Governor Martin O'Malley appointed Kratovil as a judge for the Queen Anne's County District Court. Kratovil had been nominated by the Trial Courts Judicial Nominating Commission to fill a vacancy due to the retirement of Judge John T. Clark III. He was reappointed by Governor Larry Hogan, confirmed by the State Senate, and sworn-in to another 10-year term in April 2022.

U.S. House of Representatives
Preceded by Wayne Gilchrest	Member of the U.S. House of Representatives from Maryland's 1st congressional district 2009–2011	Succeeded by Andy Harris
U.S. order of precedence (ceremonial)
Preceded by Carolyn Bourdeaux as Former U.S. Representative	Order of precedence of the United States as Former U.S. Representative	Succeeded by John Light Napier as Former U.S. Representative
