= Maryland's 1st congressional district =

U.S. House district for Maryland

Coordinates: 38.9°N 76.1°W

- Interactive map of district boundaries since January 3, 2023
- Representative: Andy Harris; R–Cambridge
- Area: 3,653.1 mi^{2} (9,461 km^{2})
- Distribution: 64.1% urban; 35.9% rural
- Population (2025): 794,293
- Median household income: $99,468
- Ethnicity: 72.1% White; 14.8% Black; 5.6% Hispanic; 4.5% Two or more races; 2.5% Asian; 0.6% other
- Cook PVI: R+8

Maryland's 1st congressional district encompasses the entire Eastern Shore of Maryland, including Salisbury, as well as Harford County and parts of Baltimore County; it is the largest congressional district in the state geographically, covering all of 10 counties and part of an 11th.

The district is currently represented by Republican Andy Harris, who defeated Democratic incumbent Frank M. Kratovil Jr. in 2010. The district was the subject of a 2014 boycott following legislation Harris introduced nullifying a District of Columbia law de-criminalizing possession of marijuana. With a Cook Partisan Voting Index rating of R+8, as of 2025 it is the only Republican district in Maryland.

== Recent election results from statewide races ==
Year	Office	Results
2008	President	McCain 57% – 41%
2012	President	Romney 59% – 41%
2012	Senate	Bongino 40% – 37%
2014	Governor	Hogan 75% – 25%
2016	President	Trump 59% – 36%
2016	Senate	Szeliga 60% – 37%
2018	Senate	Campbell 52% – 42%
2018	Governor	Hogan 77% – 22%
2018	Attorney General	Wolf 59% – 41%
2020	President	Trump 56% – 41%
2022	Senate	Chaffee 57% – 43%
2022	Governor	Cox 54% – 42%
2022	Comptroller	Glassman 62% – 38%
2022	Attorney General	Peroutka 58% – 42%
2024	President	Trump 57% – 40%
2024	Senate	Hogan 65% – 31%

== Composition ==
For the 118th and successive Congresses (based on redistricting following the 2020 census), the district contains all or portions of the following counties and communities:

Baltimore County (6)

Hampton (part; also 2nd), Honeygo, Kingsville, Middle River (part; also 2nd), Perry Hall (part; also 2nd), White Marsh (part; also 2nd)

Caroline County (13)

All 13 communities

Cecil County (8)

All 8 communities

Dorchester County (14)

All 14 communities

Harford County (16)

All 16 communities

Kent County (13)

All 13 communities

Queen Anne's County (13)

All 13 communities

Somerset County (11)

All 11 communities

Talbot County (7)

All 7 communities

Wicomico County (19)

All 19 communities

Worcester County (11)

All 11 communities

== List of members representing the district ==
#	Member (residence)	Party	Years	Con- gress	Electoral history	Location
District created March 4, 1789
1	Michael J. Stone (Haberdeventure)	Anti-Administration	March 4, 1789 – March 3, 1791	1st	Elected in 1789. Lost re-election.	1789–1833; Calvert, Charles, and St. Mary's counties in Southern Maryland.
2	Philip Key (St. Mary's County)	Pro-Administration	March 4, 1791 – March 3, 1793	2nd	Elected in 1790. Lost re-election.	1789–1833; Calvert, Charles, and St. Mary's counties in Southern Maryland.
3	George Dent (Charles County)	Pro-Administration	March 4, 1793 – March 3, 1795	3rd 4th 5th 6th	Elected in 1792. Re-elected in 1794. Re-elected in 1796. Re-elected in 1798. Retired.	1789–1833; Calvert, Charles, and St. Mary's counties in Southern Maryland.
3	George Dent (Charles County)	Federalist	March 4, 1795 – March 3, 1801	3rd 4th 5th 6th	Elected in 1792. Re-elected in 1794. Re-elected in 1796. Re-elected in 1798. Retired.	1789–1833; Calvert, Charles, and St. Mary's counties in Southern Maryland.
4	John Campbell (Port Tobacco)	Federalist	March 4, 1801 – March 3, 1811	7th 8th 9th 10th 11th	Elected in 1801. Re-elected in 1803. Re-elected in 1804. Re-elected in 1806. Re-elected in 1808. Retired.	1789–1833; Calvert, Charles, and St. Mary's counties in Southern Maryland.
5	Philip Stuart (Port Tobacco)	Federalist	March 4, 1811 – March 3, 1819	12th 13th 14th 15th	Elected in 1810. Elected in 1812. Re-elected in 1814. Re-elected in 1816. Retired.	1789–1833; Calvert, Charles, and St. Mary's counties in Southern Maryland.
6	Raphael Neale (Leonardtown)	Federalist (Note: Supported the Adams-Clay faction in the 1824 United States presidential election)	March 4, 1819 – March 3, 1825	16th 17th 18th	Elected in 1818. Re-elected in 1820. Re-elected in 1822. Lost re-election.	1789–1833; Calvert, Charles, and St. Mary's counties in Southern Maryland.
7	Clement Dorsey (Chaptico)	Anti-Jacksonian	March 4, 1825 – March 3, 1831	19th 20th 21st	Elected in 1824. Re-elected in 1826. Re-elected in 1829. Retired.	1789–1833; Calvert, Charles, and St. Mary's counties in Southern Maryland.
8	Daniel Jenifer (Allens Fresh)	Anti-Jacksonian	March 4, 1831 – March 3, 1833	22nd	Elected in 1831. Lost re-election.	1789–1833; Calvert, Charles, and St. Mary's counties in Southern Maryland.
9	Littleton Purnell Dennis (Princess Anne)	Anti-Jacksonian	March 4, 1833 – April 14, 1834	23rd	Elected in 1833. Died.	1833–1843; Dorchester, Somerset, and Worcester counties on the Eastern Shore of Maryland
Vacant			April 14, 1834 – May 29, 1834	23rd		1833–1843; Dorchester, Somerset, and Worcester counties on the Eastern Shore of Maryland
10	John N. Steele (Vienna)	Anti-Jacksonian	May 29, 1834 – March 3, 1837	23rd 24th	Elected to finish Dennis's term. Re-elected in 1835. [data missing]	1833–1843; Dorchester, Somerset, and Worcester counties on the Eastern Shore of Maryland
11	John Dennis (Princess Anne)	Whig	March 4, 1837 – March 3, 1841	25th 26th	Elected in 1837. Re-elected in 1839. [data missing]	1833–1843; Dorchester, Somerset, and Worcester counties on the Eastern Shore of Maryland
12	Isaac D. Jones (Princess Anne)	Whig	March 4, 1841 – March 3, 1843	27th	Elected in 1841. [data missing]	1833–1843; Dorchester, Somerset, and Worcester counties on the Eastern Shore of Maryland
13	John Causin (Leonardtown)	Whig	March 4, 1843 – March 3, 1845	28th	Elected late in 1844. [data missing]	1843–1853; Anne Arundel (except for Howard District), Calvert, Charles, Montgomery, Prince George's, and St. Mary's counties in Central Maryland and Southern Maryland.
14	John G. Chapman (Port Tobacco)	Whig	March 4, 1845 – March 3, 1849	29th 30th	Elected in 1845. Re-elected in 1847. [data missing]	1843–1853; Anne Arundel (except for Howard District), Calvert, Charles, Montgomery, Prince George's, and St. Mary's counties in Central Maryland and Southern Maryland.
15	Richard Bowie (Rockville)	Whig	March 4, 1849 – March 3, 1853	31st 32nd	Elected in 1849. Re-elected in 1851. [data missing]	1843–1853; Anne Arundel (except for Howard District), Calvert, Charles, Montgomery, Prince George's, and St. Mary's counties in Central Maryland and Southern Maryland.
16	John R. Franklin (Snow Hill)	Whig	March 4, 1853 – March 3, 1855	33rd	Elected in 1853. [data missing]	1853–1863; Caroline, Dorchester, Queen Anne's, Somerset, Talbot, and Worcester counties on the Eastern Shore of Maryland.
17	James A. Stewart (Cambridge)	Democratic	March 4, 1855 – March 3, 1861	34th 35th 36th	Elected in 1855. Re-elected in 1857. Re-elected in 1859. [data missing]	1853–1863; Caroline, Dorchester, Queen Anne's, Somerset, Talbot, and Worcester counties on the Eastern Shore of Maryland.
18	John W. Crisfield (Princess Anne)	Union	March 4, 1861 – March 3, 1863	37th	Elected in 1861. [data missing]	1853–1863; Caroline, Dorchester, Queen Anne's, Somerset, Talbot, and Worcester counties on the Eastern Shore of Maryland.
19	John A. J. Creswell (Elkton)	Unconditional Union	March 4, 1863 – March 3, 1865	38th	Elected in 1863. Lost re-election.	1863–1873; Caroline, Cecil, Dorchester, Kent, Queen Anne's, Somerset, Talbot, and Worcester counties on the Eastern Shore of Maryland.
20	Hiram McCullough (Elkton)	Democratic	March 4, 1865 – March 3, 1869	39th 40th	Elected in 1864. Re-elected in 1866. [data missing]	1863–1873; Caroline, Cecil, Dorchester, Kent, Queen Anne's, Somerset, Talbot, and Worcester counties on the Eastern Shore of Maryland.
21	Samuel Hambleton (Easton)	Democratic	March 4, 1869 – March 3, 1873	41st 42nd	Elected in 1868. Re-elected in 1870. [data missing]	1863–1873; Caroline, Cecil, Dorchester, Kent, Queen Anne's, Somerset, Talbot, and Worcester counties on the Eastern Shore of Maryland.
22	Ephraim King Wilson II (Snow Hill)	Democratic	March 4, 1873 – March 3, 1875	43rd	Elected in 1872. [data missing]	1873–1883; Caroline, Dorchester, Kent, Queen Anne's, Somerset, Talbot, Wicomico, and Worcester counties on the Eastern Shore of Maryland.
23	Philip Thomas (Easton)	Democratic	March 4, 1875 – March 3, 1877	44th	Elected in 1874. [data missing]	1873–1883; Caroline, Dorchester, Kent, Queen Anne's, Somerset, Talbot, Wicomico, and Worcester counties on the Eastern Shore of Maryland.
24	Daniel M. Henry (Cambridge)	Democratic	March 4, 1877 – March 3, 1881	45th 46th	Elected in 1876. Re-elected in 1878. [data missing]	1873–1883; Caroline, Dorchester, Kent, Queen Anne's, Somerset, Talbot, Wicomico, and Worcester counties on the Eastern Shore of Maryland.
25	George W. Covington (Snow Hill)	Democratic	March 4, 1881 – March 3, 1885	47th 48th	Elected in 1880. Re-elected in 1882. Retired.	1873–1883; Caroline, Dorchester, Kent, Queen Anne's, Somerset, Talbot, Wicomico, and Worcester counties on the Eastern Shore of Maryland.
25	George W. Covington (Snow Hill)	Democratic	March 4, 1881 – March 3, 1885	47th 48th	Elected in 1880. Re-elected in 1882. Retired.	1883–1893 [data missing]
26	Charles H. Gibson (Easton)	Democratic	March 4, 1885 – March 3, 1891	49th 50th 51st	Elected in 1884. Re-elected in 1886. Re-elected in 1888. Retired.	1883–1893 [data missing]
27	Henry Page (Princess Anne)	Democratic	March 4, 1891 – September 3, 1892	52nd	Elected in 1890. Resigned to become a judge of the Maryland Court of Appeals.	1883–1893 [data missing]
Vacant			September 3, 1892 – November 8, 1892	52nd		1883–1893 [data missing]
28	John B. Brown (Centerville)	Democratic	November 8, 1892 – March 3, 1893	52nd	Elected to finish Page's term. Retired.	1883–1893 [data missing]
29	Robert Brattan (Princess Anne)	Democratic	March 4, 1893 – May 10, 1894	53rd	Elected in 1892. Died.	1893–1903 [data missing]
Vacant			May 10, 1894 – November 6, 1894	53rd		1893–1903 [data missing]
30	Winder Laird Henry (Cambridge)	Democratic	November 6, 1894 – March 3, 1895	53rd	Elected to finish Brattan's term. Retired.	1893–1903 [data missing]
31	Joshua W. Miles (Princess Anne)	Democratic	March 4, 1895 – March 3, 1897	54th	Elected in 1894. Lost re-election.	1893–1903 [data missing]
32	Isaac A. Barber (Easton)	Republican	March 4, 1897 – March 3, 1899	55th	Elected in 1896. [data missing]	1893–1903 [data missing]
33	John Walter Smith (Snow Hill)	Democratic	March 4, 1899 – January 12, 1900	56th	Elected in 1898. Resigned to become Governor of Maryland.	1893–1903 [data missing]
Vacant			January 12, 1900 – November 6, 1900	56th		1893–1903 [data missing]
34	Josiah L. Kerr (Cambridge)	Republican	November 6, 1900 – March 3, 1901	56th	Elected to finish Smith's term. Retired.	1893–1903 [data missing]
35	William Humphreys Jackson (Salisbury)	Republican	March 4, 1901 – March 3, 1905	57th 58th	Elected in 1900. Re-elected in 1902. Lost re-election.	1893–1903 [data missing]
35	William Humphreys Jackson (Salisbury)	Republican	March 4, 1901 – March 3, 1905	57th 58th	Elected in 1900. Re-elected in 1902. Lost re-election.	1903–1913; Caroline, Cecil, Dorchester, Kent, Queen Anne's, Somerset, Talbot, Wicomico, and Worcester counties on the Eastern Shore of Maryland.
36	Thomas A. Smith (Ridgely)	Democratic	March 4, 1905 – March 3, 1907	59th	Elected in 1904. Lost re-election.	1903–1913; Caroline, Cecil, Dorchester, Kent, Queen Anne's, Somerset, Talbot, Wicomico, and Worcester counties on the Eastern Shore of Maryland.
37	William Humphreys Jackson (Salisbury)	Republican	March 4, 1907 – March 3, 1909	60th	Elected in 1906. Lost re-election.	1903–1913; Caroline, Cecil, Dorchester, Kent, Queen Anne's, Somerset, Talbot, Wicomico, and Worcester counties on the Eastern Shore of Maryland.
38	J. Harry Covington (Easton)	Democratic	March 4, 1909 – September 30, 1914	61st 62nd 63rd	Elected in 1908. Re-elected in 1910. Re-elected in 1912. Resigned to practice law in Washington, D.C.	1903–1913; Caroline, Cecil, Dorchester, Kent, Queen Anne's, Somerset, Talbot, Wicomico, and Worcester counties on the Eastern Shore of Maryland.
38	J. Harry Covington (Easton)	Democratic	March 4, 1909 – September 30, 1914	61st 62nd 63rd	Elected in 1908. Re-elected in 1910. Re-elected in 1912. Resigned to practice law in Washington, D.C.	1913–1933; Caroline, Cecil, Dorchester, Kent, Queen Anne's, Somerset, Talbot, Wicomico, and Worcester counties on the Eastern Shore of Maryland.
Vacant			September 30, 1914 – November 3, 1914	63rd		1913–1933; Caroline, Cecil, Dorchester, Kent, Queen Anne's, Somerset, Talbot, Wicomico, and Worcester counties on the Eastern Shore of Maryland.
39	Jesse Price (Salisbury)	Democratic	November 3, 1914 – March 3, 1919	63rd 64th 65th	Elected to finish Covington's term. Re-elected in 1914. Re-elected in 1916. Lost re-election.	1913–1933; Caroline, Cecil, Dorchester, Kent, Queen Anne's, Somerset, Talbot, Wicomico, and Worcester counties on the Eastern Shore of Maryland.
40	William N. Andrews (Cambridge)	Republican	March 4, 1919 – March 3, 1921	66th	Elected in 1918. Lost re-election.	1913–1933; Caroline, Cecil, Dorchester, Kent, Queen Anne's, Somerset, Talbot, Wicomico, and Worcester counties on the Eastern Shore of Maryland.
41	Thomas Alan Goldsborough (Denton)	Democratic	March 4, 1921 – April 5, 1939	67th 68th 69th 70th 71st 72nd 73rd 74th 75th 76th	Elected in 1920. Re-elected in 1922. Re-elected in 1924. Re-elected in 1926. Re-elected in 1928. Re-elected in 1930. Re-elected in 1932. Re-elected in 1934. Re-elected in 1936. Re-elected in 1938. Resigned to become associate justice of the District Court of the United States for the District of Columbia.	1913–1933; Caroline, Cecil, Dorchester, Kent, Queen Anne's, Somerset, Talbot, Wicomico, and Worcester counties on the Eastern Shore of Maryland.
41	Thomas Alan Goldsborough (Denton)	Democratic	March 4, 1921 – April 5, 1939	67th 68th 69th 70th 71st 72nd 73rd 74th 75th 76th	Elected in 1920. Re-elected in 1922. Re-elected in 1924. Re-elected in 1926. Re-elected in 1928. Re-elected in 1930. Re-elected in 1932. Re-elected in 1934. Re-elected in 1936. Re-elected in 1938. Resigned to become associate justice of the District Court of the United States for the District of Columbia.	1933–1943 [data missing]
Vacant			April 5, 1939 – June 8, 1939	76th		1933–1943 [data missing]
42	David Jenkins Ward (Salisbury)	Democratic	June 8, 1939 – January 3, 1945	76th 77th 78th	Elected to finish Goldsborough's term. Re-elected in 1940. Re-elected in 1942. Lost re-election.	1933–1943 [data missing]
42	David Jenkins Ward (Salisbury)	Democratic	June 8, 1939 – January 3, 1945	76th 77th 78th	Elected to finish Goldsborough's term. Re-elected in 1940. Re-elected in 1942. Lost re-election.	1943–1953 [data missing]
43	Dudley Roe (Sudlersville)	Democratic	January 3, 1945 – January 3, 1947	79th	Elected in 1944. Lost re-election.	1943–1953 [data missing]
44	Edward T. Miller (Easton)	Republican	January 3, 1947 – January 3, 1959	80th 81st 82nd 83rd 84th 85th	Elected in 1946. Re-elected in 1948. Re-elected in 1950. Re-elected in 1952. Re-elected in 1954. Re-elected in 1956. Lost re-election.	1943–1953 [data missing]
44	Edward T. Miller (Easton)	Republican	January 3, 1947 – January 3, 1959	80th 81st 82nd 83rd 84th 85th	Elected in 1946. Re-elected in 1948. Re-elected in 1950. Re-elected in 1952. Re-elected in 1954. Re-elected in 1956. Lost re-election.	1953–1963 [data missing]
45	Thomas F. Johnson (Berlin)	Democratic	January 3, 1959 – January 3, 1963	86th 87th	Elected in 1958. Re-elected in 1960. Lost re-election.	1953–1963 [data missing]
46	Rogers Morton (Easton)	Republican	January 3, 1963 – January 29, 1971	88th 89th 90th 91st 92nd	Elected in 1962. Re-elected in 1964. Re-elected in 1966. Re-elected in 1968. Re-elected in 1970. Resigned to become U.S. Secretary of the Interior.	1963–1973; Caroline, Cecil, Dorchester, Kent, Queen Anne's, Somerset, Talbot, Wicomico, and Worcester counties on the Eastern Shore of Maryland, and parts of Baltimore County in Central Maryland.
Vacant			January 29, 1971 – May 25, 1971	92nd		1963–1973; Caroline, Cecil, Dorchester, Kent, Queen Anne's, Somerset, Talbot, Wicomico, and Worcester counties on the Eastern Shore of Maryland, and parts of Baltimore County in Central Maryland.
47	William O. Mills (Easton)	Republican	May 25, 1971 – May 24, 1973	92nd 93rd	Elected to finish Morton's term. Re-elected in 1972. Died by suicide.	1963–1973; Caroline, Cecil, Dorchester, Kent, Queen Anne's, Somerset, Talbot, Wicomico, and Worcester counties on the Eastern Shore of Maryland, and parts of Baltimore County in Central Maryland.
47	William O. Mills (Easton)	Republican	May 25, 1971 – May 24, 1973	92nd 93rd	Elected to finish Morton's term. Re-elected in 1972. Died by suicide.	1973–1983; Caroline, Cecil, Dorchester, Kent, Queen Anne's, Somerset, Talbot, Wicomico, and Worcester counties on the Eastern Shore of Maryland, and Anne Arundel, Calvert, Charles, and St. Mary's counties in Southern Maryland and parts of Baltimore County, Harford County and Baltimore City in Central Maryland.
Vacant			May 24, 1973 – August 21, 1973	93rd		1973–1983; Caroline, Cecil, Dorchester, Kent, Queen Anne's, Somerset, Talbot, Wicomico, and Worcester counties on the Eastern Shore of Maryland, and Anne Arundel, Calvert, Charles, and St. Mary's counties in Southern Maryland and parts of Baltimore County, Harford County and Baltimore City in Central Maryland.
48	Robert Bauman (Easton)	Republican	August 21, 1973 – January 3, 1981	93rd 94th 95th 96th	Elected to finish Mills's term. Re-elected in 1974. Re-elected in 1976. Re-elected in 1978. Lost re-election.	1973–1983; Caroline, Cecil, Dorchester, Kent, Queen Anne's, Somerset, Talbot, Wicomico, and Worcester counties on the Eastern Shore of Maryland, and Anne Arundel, Calvert, Charles, and St. Mary's counties in Southern Maryland and parts of Baltimore County, Harford County and Baltimore City in Central Maryland.
49	Roy Dyson (Great Mills)	Democratic	January 3, 1981 – January 3, 1991	97th 98th 99th 100th 101st	Elected in 1980. Re-elected in 1982. Re-elected in 1984. Re-elected in 1986. Re-elected in 1988. Lost re-election.	1973–1983; Caroline, Cecil, Dorchester, Kent, Queen Anne's, Somerset, Talbot, Wicomico, and Worcester counties on the Eastern Shore of Maryland, and Anne Arundel, Calvert, Charles, and St. Mary's counties in Southern Maryland and parts of Baltimore County, Harford County and Baltimore City in Central Maryland.
49	Roy Dyson (Great Mills)	Democratic	January 3, 1981 – January 3, 1991	97th 98th 99th 100th 101st	Elected in 1980. Re-elected in 1982. Re-elected in 1984. Re-elected in 1986. Re-elected in 1988. Lost re-election.	1983–1993 [data missing]
50	Wayne Gilchrest (Kennedyville)	Republican	January 3, 1991 – January 3, 2009	102nd 103rd 104th 105th 106th 107th 108th 109th 110th	Elected in 1990. Re-elected in 1992. Re-elected in 1994. Re-elected in 1996. Re-elected in 1998. Re-elected in 2000. Re-elected in 2002. Re-elected in 2004. Re-elected in 2006. Lost renomination.	1983–1993 [data missing]
50	Wayne Gilchrest (Kennedyville)	Republican	January 3, 1991 – January 3, 2009	102nd 103rd 104th 105th 106th 107th 108th 109th 110th	Elected in 1990. Re-elected in 1992. Re-elected in 1994. Re-elected in 1996. Re-elected in 1998. Re-elected in 2000. Re-elected in 2002. Re-elected in 2004. Re-elected in 2006. Lost renomination.	1993–2003 [data missing]
50	Wayne Gilchrest (Kennedyville)	Republican	January 3, 1991 – January 3, 2009	102nd 103rd 104th 105th 106th 107th 108th 109th 110th	Elected in 1990. Re-elected in 1992. Re-elected in 1994. Re-elected in 1996. Re-elected in 1998. Re-elected in 2000. Re-elected in 2002. Re-elected in 2004. Re-elected in 2006. Lost renomination.	2003–2013; Caroline, Cecil, Dorchester, Kent, Queen Anne's, Somerset, Talbot, Wicomico, and Worcester counties on the Eastern Shore of Maryland, and parts of Anne Arundel County in Southern Maryland and Baltimore County in Central Maryland.
51	Frank Kratovil (Stevensville)	Democratic	January 3, 2009 – January 3, 2011	111th	Elected in 2008. Lost re-election.	2003–2013; Caroline, Cecil, Dorchester, Kent, Queen Anne's, Somerset, Talbot, Wicomico, and Worcester counties on the Eastern Shore of Maryland, and parts of Anne Arundel County in Southern Maryland and Baltimore County in Central Maryland.
52	Andy Harris (Cambridge)	Republican	January 3, 2011 – present	112th 113th 114th 115th 116th 117th 118th 119th	Elected in 2010. Re-elected in 2012. Re-elected in 2014. Re-elected in 2016. Re-elected in 2018. Re-elected in 2020. Re-elected in 2022. Re-elected in 2024. Re-elected in 2026.	2003–2013; Caroline, Cecil, Dorchester, Kent, Queen Anne's, Somerset, Talbot, Wicomico, and Worcester counties on the Eastern Shore of Maryland, and parts of Anne Arundel County in Southern Maryland and Baltimore County in Central Maryland.
52	Andy Harris (Cambridge)	Republican	January 3, 2011 – present	112th 113th 114th 115th 116th 117th 118th 119th	Elected in 2010. Re-elected in 2012. Re-elected in 2014. Re-elected in 2016. Re-elected in 2018. Re-elected in 2020. Re-elected in 2022. Re-elected in 2024. Re-elected in 2026.	2013–2023
52	Andy Harris (Cambridge)	Republican	January 3, 2011 – present	112th 113th 114th 115th 116th 117th 118th 119th	Elected in 2010. Re-elected in 2012. Re-elected in 2014. Re-elected in 2016. Re-elected in 2018. Re-elected in 2020. Re-elected in 2022. Re-elected in 2024. Re-elected in 2026.	2023–present

== Recent election results ==
=== 2000s ===
2000 Maryland's 1st congressional district election
Party	Candidate	Votes	%
Republican	Wayne Gilchrest (Incumbent)	165,293	64.40%
Democratic	Bennett Bozman	91,022	35.46%
Green	David M. Gross	73	0.03%
N/A	Write-ins	294	0.11%
Total votes		256,682	100.00%
Republican hold			

2002 Maryland's 1st congressional district election
Party	Candidate	Votes	%
Republican	Wayne Gilchrest (Incumbent)	192,004	76.83%
Democratic	Amy D. Tamlyn	57,986	23.20%
Total votes		249,900	100.00%
Republican hold			

2004 Maryland's 1st congressional district election
Party	Candidate	Votes	%	±%
Republican	Wayne Gilchrest (Incumbent)	245,149	75.89%	−0.94%
Democratic	Kostas Alexakis	77,872	24.11%	+0.91%
Total votes		323,021	100.00%	?
Republican hold		Swing	[?]	

2006 Maryland's 1st congressional district election
Party	Candidate	Votes	%	±%
Republican	Wayne Gilchrest (Incumbent)	185,177	68.80%	−7.09%
Democratic	Jim Corwin	83,738	31.11%	+7.00%
Write-ins		232	0.09%	+0.09%
Total votes		269,147	100.00%	?
Republican hold		Swing	[?]	

2008 Maryland's 1st congressional district election
Party	Candidate	Votes	%	±%
Democratic	Frank Kratovil	177,065	49.12%	+18.01%
Republican	Andy Harris	174,213	48.33%	−20.47%
Libertarian	Richard J. Davis	8,873	2.46%	+2.46%
No party	Write-ins	329	0.09%	
Total votes		360,480	100.00%	
Democratic gain from Republican				

=== 2010s ===
2010 Maryland's 1st congressional district election
Party	Candidate	Votes	%	±%
Republican	Andrew P. Harris	155,118	54.08%	+5.75%
Democratic	Frank Kratovil (Incumbent)	120,400	41.98%	−7.14%
Libertarian	Richard J. Davis	10,876	3.79%	+1.33%
No party	Write-ins	418	0.15%	
Total votes		286,812	100.00%	
Republican gain from Democratic				

2012 Maryland's 1st congressional district election
Party	Candidate	Votes	%
Republican	Andrew P. Harris (Incumbent)	214,204	63.4%
Democratic	Wendy Rosen	92,812	27.5%
Democratic	John LaFerla (write-in)	14,858	4.4%
Libertarian	Muir Wayne Boda	12,857	3.8%
N/A	Others (write-in)	3,029	0.9%
Total votes		337,760	100%
Republican hold			

2014 Maryland's 1st congressional district election
Party	Candidate	Votes	%
Republican	Andrew P. Harris (Incumbent)	176,324	70.4%
Democratic	Bill Tilghman	73,843	29.5%
N/A	Others (write-in)	233	0.1%
Total votes		250,418	100%
Republican hold			

2016 Maryland's 1st congressional district election
Party	Candidate	Votes	%
Republican	Andrew P. Harris (Incumbent)	242,574	67.0%
Democratic	Joe Werner	103,622	28.6%
Libertarian	Matt Beers	15,370	4.2%
N/A	Others (write-in)	531	0.1%
Total votes		362,097	100%
Republican hold			

2018 Maryland's 1st congressional district election
Party	Candidate	Votes	%
Republican	Andrew P. Harris (Incumbent)	183,662	60.0%
Democratic	Jesse Colvin	116,631	38.1%
Libertarian	Jenica Martin	5,744	1.9%
N/A	Others (write-in)	149	0.0%
Total votes		306,186	100%
Republican hold			

=== 2020s ===
2020 Maryland's 1st congressional district election
Party	Candidate	Votes	%
Republican	Andrew P. Harris (incumbent)	250,901	63.4
Democratic	Mia Mason	143,877	36.4
Write-in		746	0.2
Total votes		395,524	100.0
Republican hold			

2022 Maryland's 1st congressional district election
Party	Candidate	Votes	%
Republican	Andrew P. Harris (incumbent)	159,673	54.4
Democratic	Heather Mizeur	126,511	43.1
Libertarian	Daniel Thibeault	6,924	2.4
Write-in		250	0.1
Total votes		293,358	100.0
Republican hold			

2024 Maryland's 1st congressional district election
Party	Candidate	Votes	%
Republican	Andrew P. Harris (incumbent)	246,356	59.41
Democratic	Blane H. Miller, III	154,985	37.37
Libertarian	Joshua W. O'Brien	12,664	3.05
Write-in		675	0.16
Total votes		414,680	100.0
Republican hold			

== See also ==
- Maryland's congressional districts
- List of United States congressional districts
