= Boycott of Maryland's 1st congressional district =

Regional business boycott to protest legislation led by its U.S. House representative

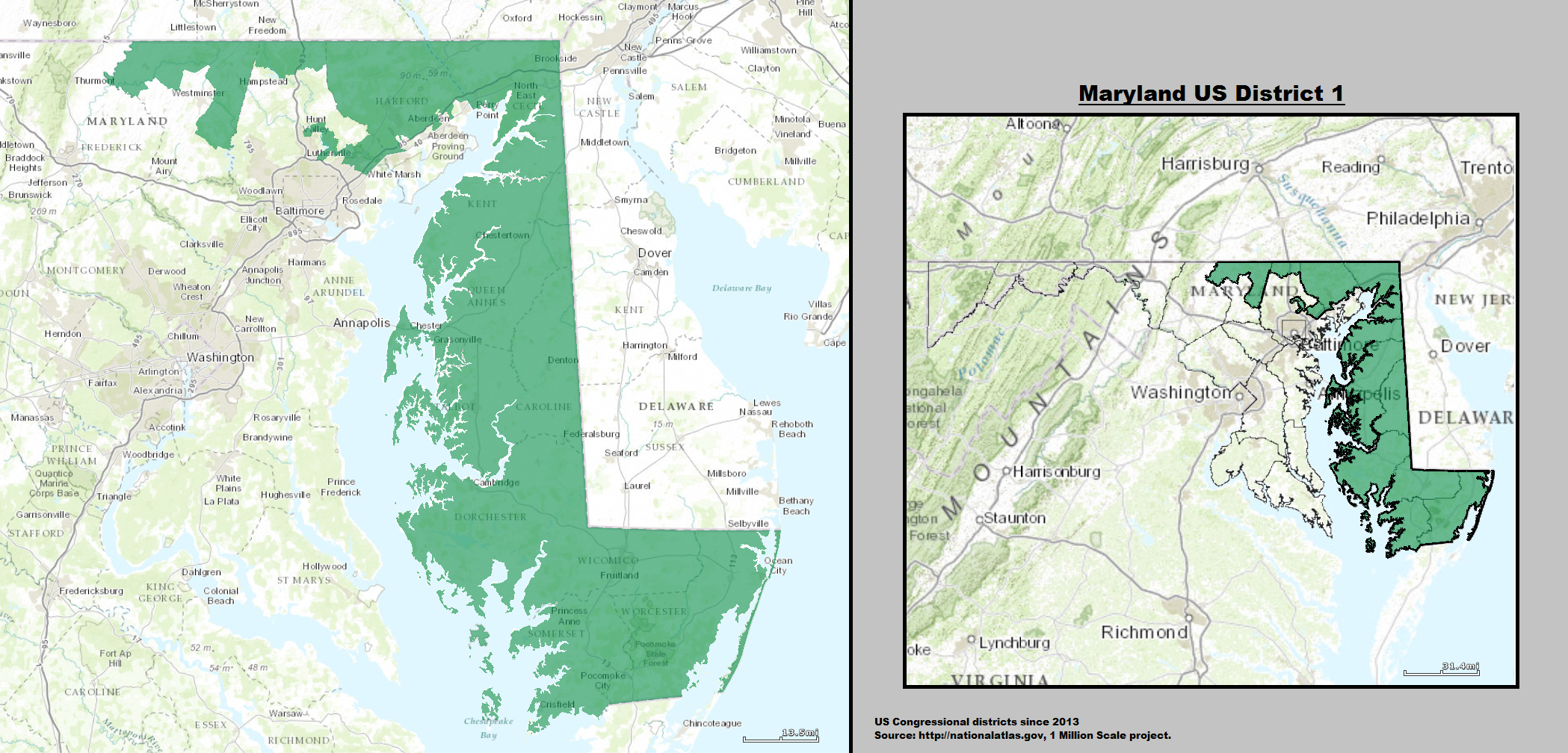
Maryland's 1st district

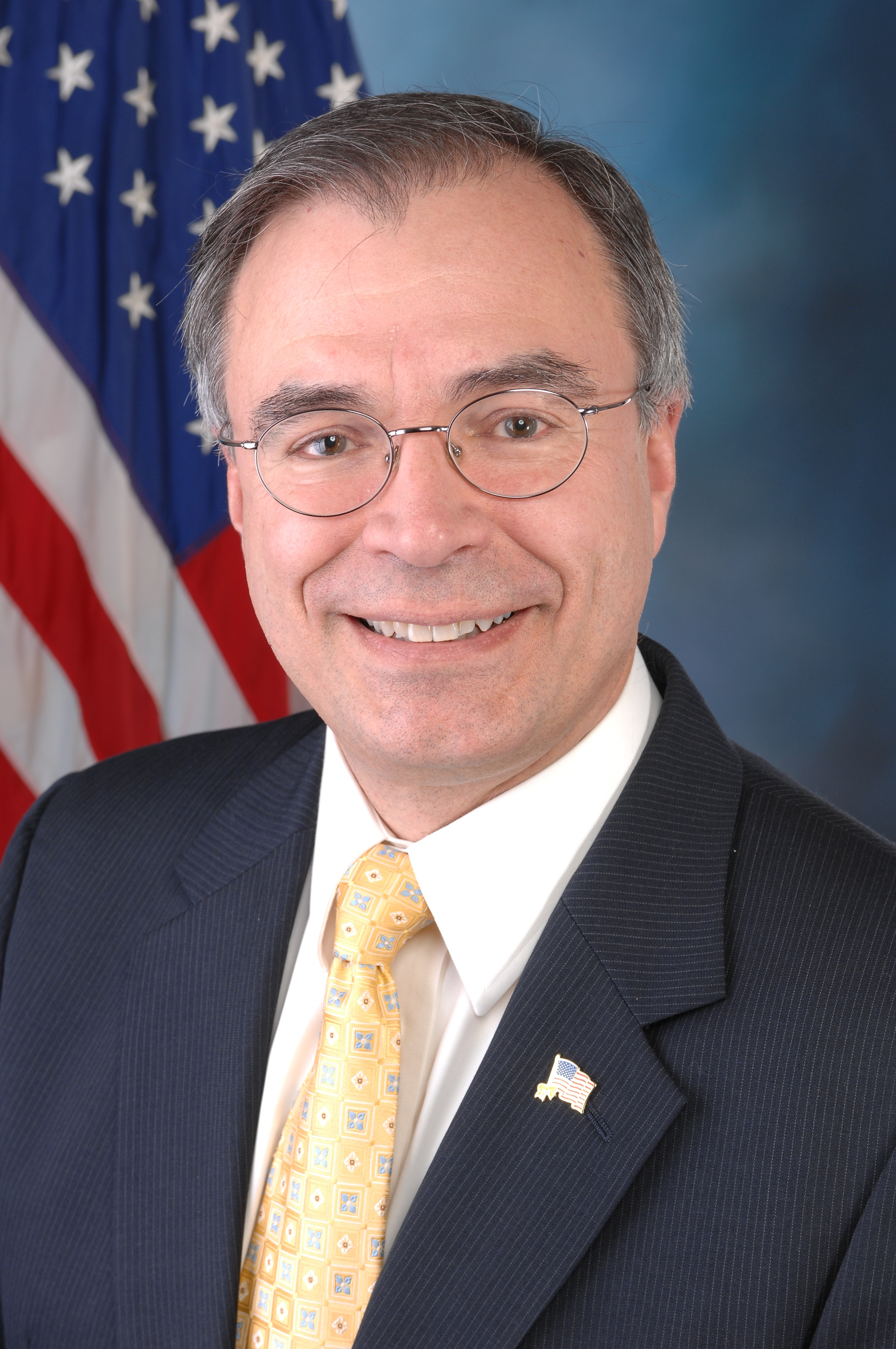
Andy Harris

The boycott of Maryland's 1st congressional district (also known as the boycott of Ocean City and boycott of the Eastern Shore) was conducted in response to 2014 congressional legislation that interfered with the ability of the District of Columbia to pass its own laws. The boycott was prompted by an appropriation amendment by Maryland Representative Andy Harris that would nullify D.C. laws on marijuana decriminalization.

== Background ==
In March 2014, the D.C. Council voted overwhelmingly to eliminate jail time for possession of marijuana, calling it necessary to combat deep racial disparities in drug arrests in the city. In a January 2014 poll by The Washington Post, roughly eight in 10 city residents supported legalizing or decriminalizing marijuana.

On June 25, 2014, House Republicans blocked funding for the D.C. law. The effort to keep the District from loosening its marijuana laws was led by Andy Harris, a Republican in Congress representing Maryland's 1st congressional district which includes the Eastern Shore and Ocean City. The Harris amendment bans the D.C. government from spending any funds on efforts to lessen penalties for Schedule I federal drug crimes. Once enacted, the measure will interfere with D.C.'s decriminalization law and a possible legalization ballot initiative.

Appropriations riders are a strategy frequently used to block unfavorable local legislation. It took a decade for medical marijuana backers to remove a rider preventing the District from moving forward with the system. D.C. currently lacks voting representation in Congress and all locally passed laws must be sent to Congress for review and approval.

In February 2015, D.C. Mayor Muriel Bowser implemented the popular legislation legalizing possession of marijuana. Harris said if one of his fellow Republicans captures the White House in 2016, he hopes they revisit Bowser's actions and prosecute her.

== Opposition to Harris ==
The interference by Harris was viewed as a defeat for District of Columbia home rule, and the ability of its Democratic mayor and the D.C. council to self-govern. Harris explained his initiative by saying "Our constitution is very specific on how the federal enclave of the District of Columbia is to be treated". Some speculated that Harris' interest in a leadership position in Congress prompted his amendment.

It was uncertain if the legislation would force the city to shut down its entire medical marijuana program, which started in 2013. In April 2014, Maryland became the latest of three states that have passed similar laws eliminating jail time for marijuana possession when Martin O'Malley signed a bill to move possession of less than 10 grams of marijuana from a criminal to a civil offense. Harris argued that the D.C. law was "bad policy" assessing a fine of $25—a fraction of the $100 fine in Maryland.

On July 2, the ACLU and NAACP were among 41 other local and national organizations in delivering letters to all members of Congress urging them to oppose policy riders that would undermine the District's local autonomy. The groups, collectively representing millions of Americans, pledged a united front in opposing measures that they say "target" the district.

== Boycott planning and announcement ==
The nonprofit group D.C. Vote called for an all-out boycott of vacation spots in the 1st congressional district, saying Harris "acted in wanton disregard" of the views of D.C. residents.

Before announcing the boycott, D.C. Vote said it had contacted local officials in the 1st district, informing them that the call for a boycott was not a reflection on them as businesses. It was emphasized that a similar attack on their local jurisdictions' laws would never be tolerated. D.C. Vote Director Kimberly Perry explained that while District residents may not have a vote in Congress, they can vote with their wallets. Alternate vacation spots in Delaware, Virginia and even Maryland were suggested instead of the Eastern Shore.

Mayor Vincent Gray encouraged the boycott, saying "I don't think we should support someone who doesn't support us, who doesn't support democracy, period". Gray also suggested that those D.C. residents who do visit Harris's district might picket his office. In response, Harris attacked the mayor for his loss in the primary election.

Organizers identified "#BoycottMD1D" as their Twitter hashtag.

== Reaction by politicians and businesses ==
Harris rebuffed efforts by D.C. Councilmember David Catania to meet with him about the boycott.

Businesses in the Eastern Shore said that they hoped that other measures could be pursued besides a boycott of their businesses and said they welcome visitors of all political affiliations.

Harris said city residents "know better" than to boycott his district's beauty spots. "Spending the weekend on the beautiful, family friendly Eastern Shore is more important than increasing drug use by D.C. teenagers."

== Other forms of protest ==
An initiative was launched encouraging businesses to ban Maryland Rep. Andy Harris and his congressional staff from their establishments. At least one bike shop posted a picture of Harris with the words "Not Welcome".

In 2015, protest efforts were re-energized following a segment on HBO's Last Week Tonight with John Oliver. Organizers arranged buses to the Eastern Shore to educate tourists and protest Washingtonians' lack of voting rights, encouraging more calls to Harris' office.
