= Larry E. Haines =

American politician (1938–2024)

Member of the Maryland Senate from the 5th district
- In office January 9, 1991 – January 12, 2011
- Preceded by: Sharon W. Hornberger
- Succeeded by: Joseph M. Getty

Personal details
- Born: April 11, 1938 Woodbine, Maryland, U.S.
- Died: January 13, 2024 (aged 85) Taneytown, Maryland, U.S.
- Party: Republican

Larry Eugene Haines (April 11, 1938 – January 13, 2024) was an American politician who was a Republican member of the Maryland Senate from 1991 to 2011.

== Background ==
Larry Haines was elected to the Maryland Senate in 1991 to represent district 5, which covers Carroll and Baltimore counties. Haines graduated from Mt. Airy High School and attended Frederick Community College.

== Career ==
Haines was a real estate broker and an appraiser and was a former dairy farmer. He was a member of the Maryland Association of Realtors (legislative committee, 1986–1990), chair of the Legislative Committee, Carroll County Association of Realtors, from 1986 to 1990, a member of the American Association of Certified Appraisers, and a director of the Bank of Maryland Carroll County.

In 1975, he received the Realtor of the Year award by the Carroll County Association of Realtors.

Haines was a member of the Housing Study Committee for the city of Westminster from 1974 to 1980, and a member of the Board of Zoning Appeals for the city of Westminster from 1983 to 1989.

== Death ==
Haines died on January 13, 2024, at the age of 85.

== Election results ==
- 2006 race for Maryland State Senate – District 5

Name	Votes	Percent	Outcome
Larry E. Haines, Rep.	23,870	97.9%	Won
Other Write-Ins	618	2.1%	Lost

- 2002 race for Maryland State Senate – District 5

Name	Votes	Percent	Outcome
Larry E. Haines, Rep.	35,749	74.2%	Won
Ronald Zepp, Dem.	12,399	25.7%	Lost
Other Write-Ins	49	0.1%	Lost

- 1998 race for Maryland State Senate – District 5

Name	Votes	Percent	Outcome
Larry E. Haines, Rep.	29,341	100%	Won

- 1994 race for Maryland State Senate – District 5

Name	Votes	Percent	Outcome
Larry E. Haines, Rep.	22,599	64%	Won
Cynthia Huggins Cummings, Dem.	12,857	36%	Lost

- 1990 race for Maryland State Senate – District 5

Name	Votes	Percent	Outcome
Larry E. Haines, Rep.	16,400	53%	Won
J. Jeffrey Griffith, Dem.	14,373	47%	Lost
