= Old Main Line Subdivision =

Railway line in Maryland

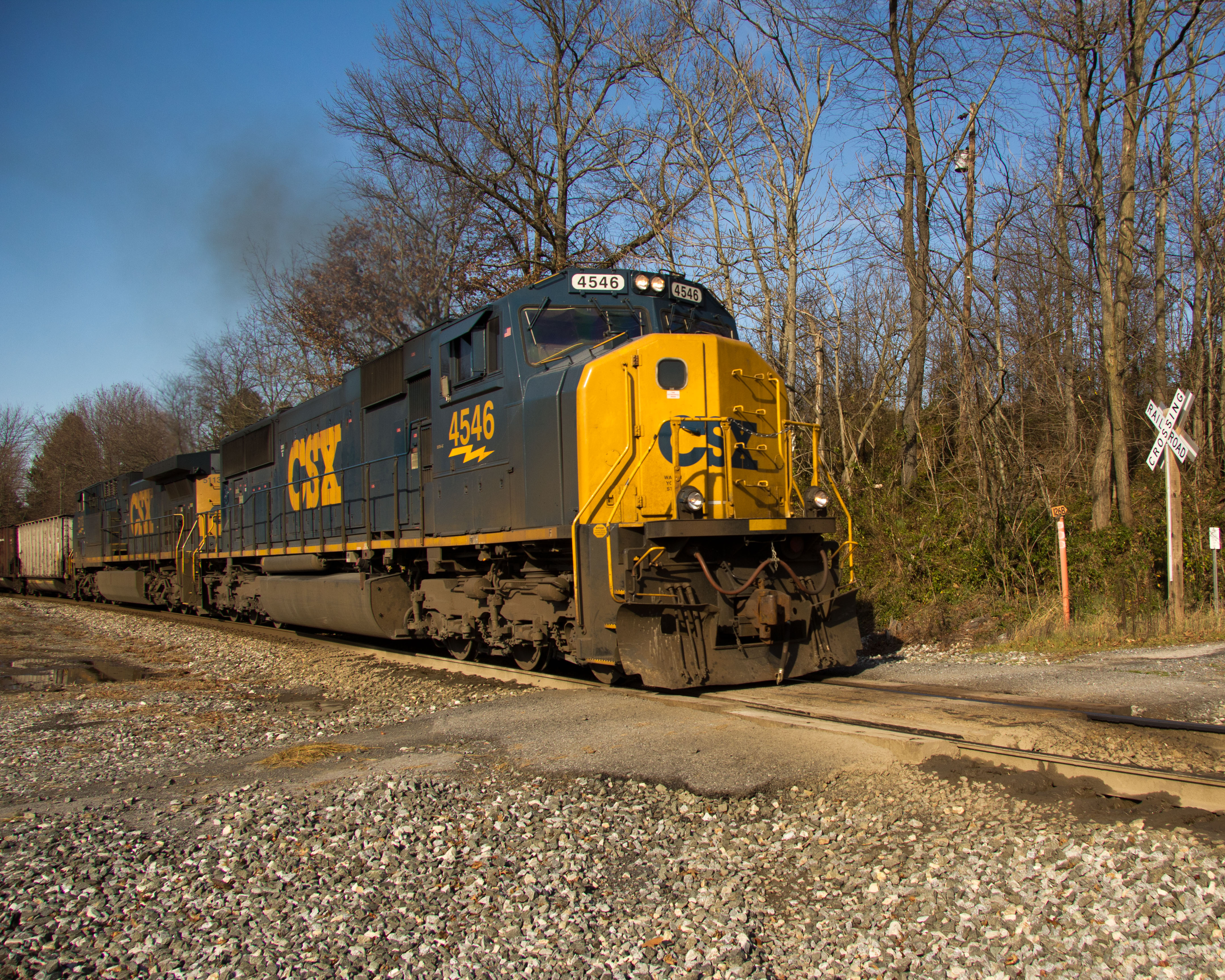
- Eastbound coal train on the Old Main Line Subdivision at Monrovia in 2011

Overview
- Status: operational
- Locale: Maryland, USA

Service
- System: CSX Transportation

Technical
- Track gauge: 4 ft 8 1/2 in (1,435 mm) standard gauge

Old Main Line Subdivision

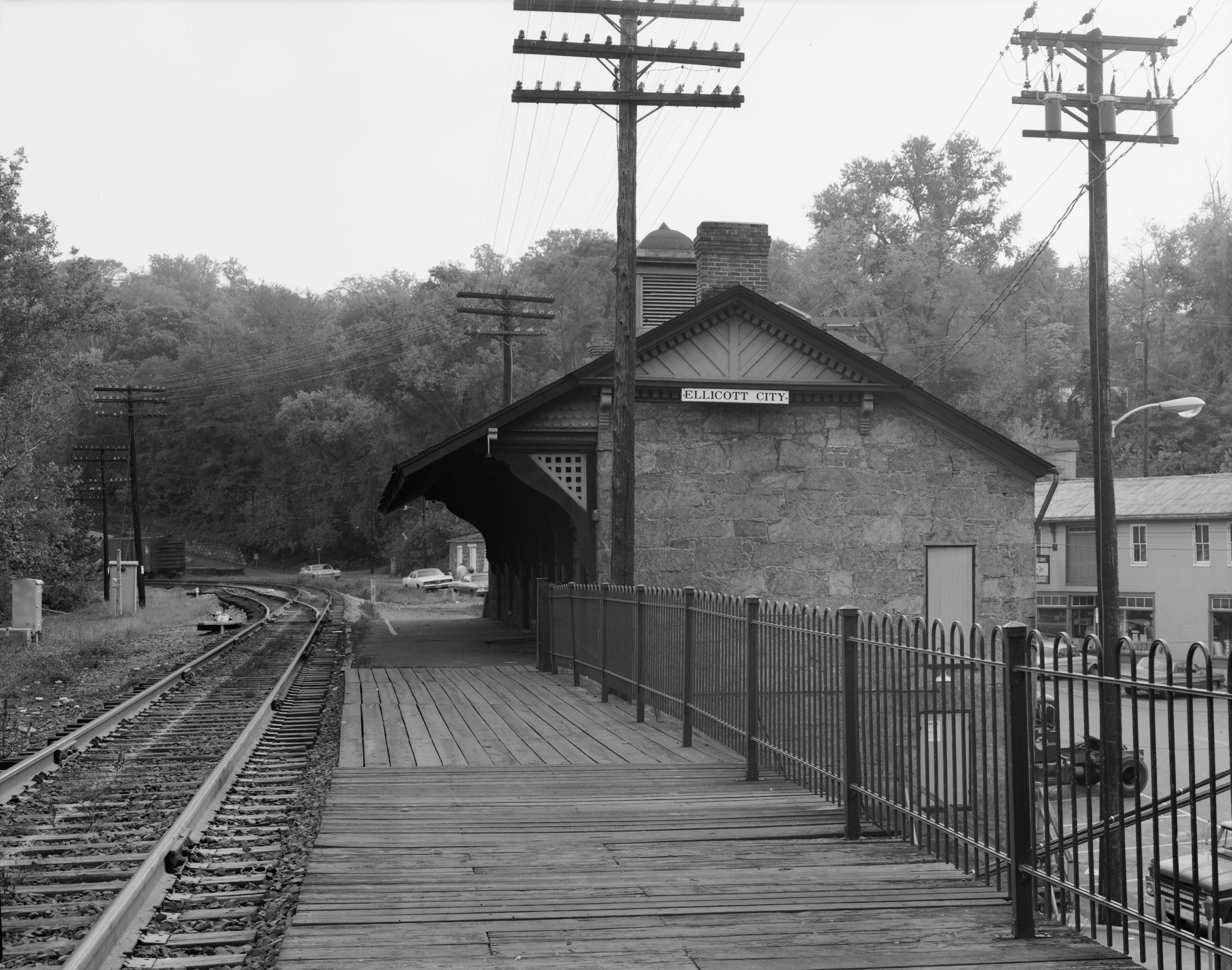
Ellicott City Station, built 1830, is the oldest surviving passenger station in the United States. Photo taken in 1970, looking south towards Baltimore.

The Old Main Line Subdivision is a railroad line owned and operated by CSX Transportation in the U.S. state of Maryland. The line runs from Relay (outside Baltimore) west to Point of Rocks, and was once the main line of the Baltimore and Ohio Railroad, one of the oldest rail lines in the United States. At its east end, it has junctions with the Capital Subdivision and the Baltimore Terminal Subdivision; its west end has a junction with the Metropolitan Subdivision.

== History ==
The initial route of the Baltimore and Ohio Railroad (B&O) followed the Patapsco River valley west out of Baltimore, with the first section (to what is now Ellicott City, Maryland) opening for service in 1830. The line left the valley to cross Parr's Ridge, which, after an abortive attempt to use a system of inclined planes, was crossed via a more round-about routing through Mount Airy. It continued west to Harper's Ferry, West Virginia, passing south of Frederick on the way. This line was the only route west out of Baltimore until the Metropolitan Branch was constructed from Washington, DC to Point of Rocks in the 1870s. The section of the original route between Relay (where the Washington Branch began) and Point of Rocks became known as the "Old Main Line" (OML), alluding to its subsidiary status, and continues to be known as the Old Main Line Subdivision in CSX timetables.

=== Initial improvements ===
With railroad technology in its infancy, the engineers of the B&O made many design decisions that quickly proved to be mistaken. For instance, the route was laid out to minimize grades at the expense of curvature; over the next century, however, to eliminate and bypass the sharp curves that resulted from this decision, bridges and tunnels were constructed. The planes over Parr's Ridge also resulted from this same thinking, and subsequently gained the distinction of becoming one of the first railroad main line right-of-way abandonments in history.

Initially, a system of granite stringers and strap rail was preferred, although time, expense, and difficulty in obtaining sufficient granite led to the substitution of wooden ties and heavier "T-rails" for much of the route, beginning in the 1840s. In the 1850s, when Benjamin Henry Latrobe, II was chief operating engineer, the need to address these deficiencies became acute, and a variety of improvements were made, subject to the railroad's limited resources at the time. All of the granite stringers and strap rail were replaced, and certain realignments were made. Among these was the "Elysville cutoff," where a pair of bridges were constructed to bypass a sharp curve on the south side of the river. In making these improvements, older structures were simply abandoned. The granite stringers of the original roadbed were simply left in place and buried.

B&O built its first tunnel in 1850 at Henryton. The Henryton Tunnel was widened for double track in 1865, after the Civil War.

=== The flood of 1868 ===
In 1868, a freak storm flooded the Patapsco and severely damaged the railroad, as well as washing away many of its customers. Most of the railroad was rebuilt, but with many alterations to the surviving structures. For instance, all but one arch of the Patterson Viaduct at Ilchester were washed away; the railroad retained the remaining arch to use as an abutment for the Bollman truss bridge which replaced the viaduct.

=== Station building ===
The first station on the line was built in Ellicott City in 1830, Over the years this station was modified and enlarged, and it survives to this day. The next station erected was a freight depot in Frederick, built 1831. Another simple station was built in Mt. Airy, which also survives.

In the 1870s and 1880s, the railroad undertook a program of station building. Most of these were designed by E. Francis Baldwin and several towns on the Old Main Line received such stations, erected in either wood or brick. The most famous of these, Point of Rocks, still stands and is still in use in the wye between the OML and the Metropolitan Subdivision. Other stations were built at Sykesville, Ilchester, and Woodstock, though not all survive.

=== Improvements under Leonor F. Loree ===
In 1901, Leonor F. Loree was installed as president of the railroad. Among other projects, he initiated a reassessment of the Old Main Line which led to a project of systematic improvements. Much of the original route and many reroutings were abandoned in favor of new routes along the valley. Many new tunnels were cut, and new bridges were built along new alignments. In particular, the Mt. Airy Cutoff tunnelled through Parr's Ridge and reduced the old line through Mt. Airy to a spur. (Ironically the west end of the spur met the main line at the base of Plane 3, the middle of the western half of the original inclined plane system.) B&O maintained the spur as a loop until 1957, when the eastern end was abandoned.

At the west end of the line, the Adamstown Cutoff was built to allow operation of coal drags over the OML, minimizing the use of helpers. A water and coaling stop was added at Reels Mill to support this. In practice the operation was not successful, and the cutoff was discontinued, though it was not pulled up for decades.

=== Decline and Hurricane Agnes damage ===
Following the opening of the Metropolitan Branch in 1873, the B&O rerouted its through passenger trains via Washington, and passenger service on the OML became strictly local. By 1928, only three passenger trains left Baltimore on the OML each day. The area lacked industry, and the granite mines at the east end of the valley did not last, so service declined steadily. During World War II, however, traffic rose dramatically, and a new water and coal station was added at Gaither to allow engines to be serviced away from the congestion of Baltimore City. These facilities were closed shortly after the end of the war, and all passenger service ended soon after. In 1959, the line was reduced to single track to increase the clearance through the tunnels, and Centralized Traffic Control (CTC) was introduced.

In 1972, Hurricane Agnes flooded the valley again, washing out large portions of the line. The B&O considered abandoning the line, and several years passed before service was restored. For many years much of the line remained dark (i.e. operating without signals), but eventually the entire line was re-signalled.

=== MARC service ===
The OML saw the return of passenger rail service in December 2001, when MARC added service to Frederick via two new stations on the Frederick Branch. The service, which branches from the Brunswick Line at Point of Rocks, was started in response to the substantial growth of commuters between Frederick and Washington during the 1990s. Prior to the start of the service, a leg was added to the wye between the OML and the Metropolitan Branch at Point of Rocks to allow trains traveling between Frederick and Washington to make a direct movement between the two lines. This service remains the only scheduled passenger operation on the OML.

== Archaeology ==
After the initial push, the builders of the OML tended to prefer very permanent materials—stone and iron—over the wooden structures used elsewhere. And since much of the river valley became part of the Patapsco Valley State Park, the area along the line contains an uncommonly large range of early 19th century railroad artifacts and structures, readily accessible to the railfan. In many places even the granite stringers of the original roadbed can be seen.

Some of the more notable relics are:

- The remains of the Patterson Viaduct at Ilchester (where the foundation of the demolished Ilchester station can also be seen)
- The station in Ellicott City (now a museum)
- The remains of the Elysville bridges at Daniels
- The Sykesville station (used as the prototype for a well-known HO scale model)
- The original Twin Arch Bridge on the Mt. Airy planes alignment
- The station and junction at Point of Rocks

== See also ==
- Industrial archaeology
