= Ellicott City, Maryland =

- Census-designated place
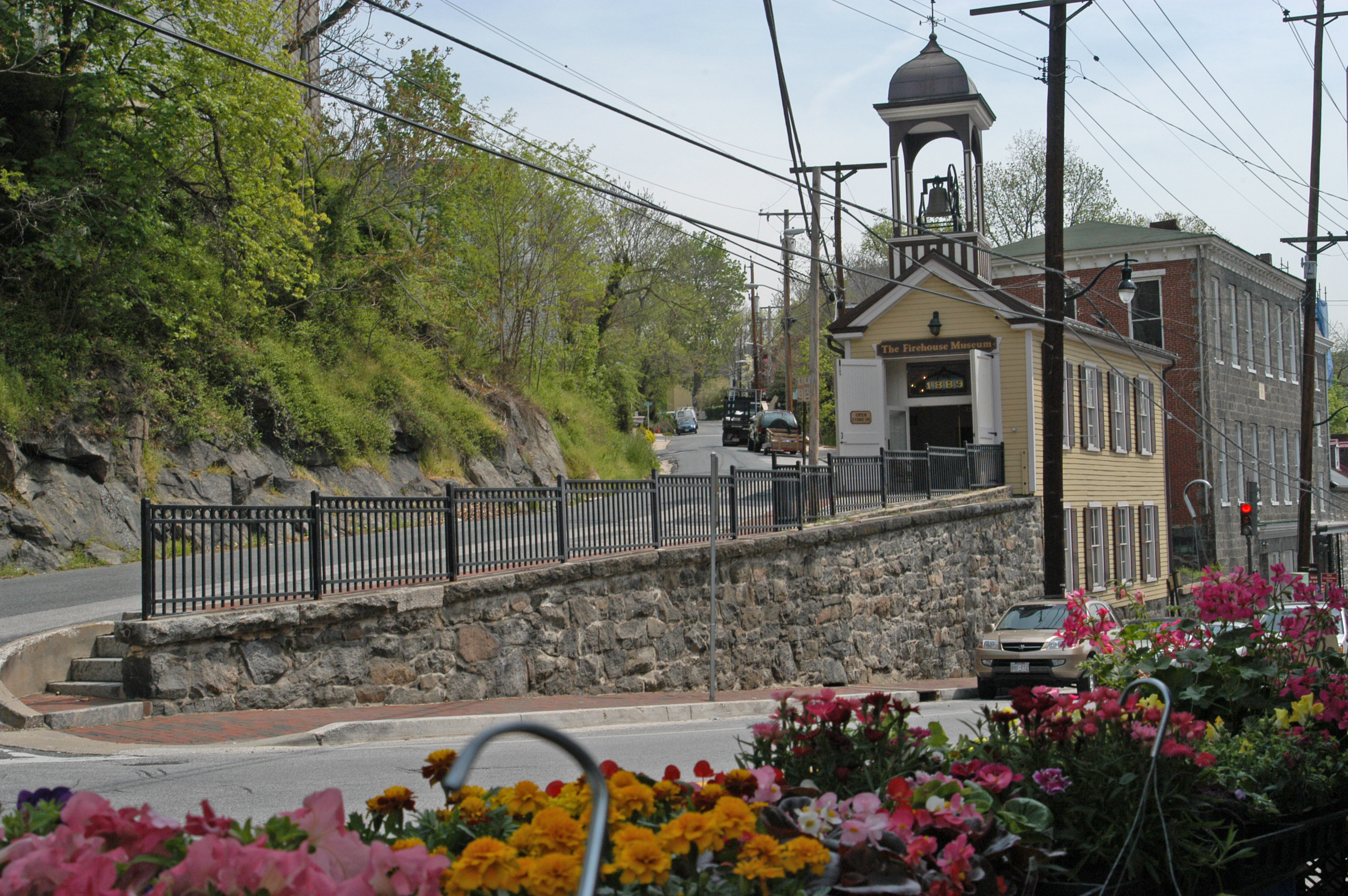
- Main Street in Historic Ellicott City
- Nicknames: "E.C.", "Old Ellicott City", "Old Ellicott", "Historic Ellicott City"
- Motto: "E.C. Strong"
- Location of Ellicott City, Maryland
- Coordinates: 39°16′5″N 76°47′56″W
- Country: United States
- State: Maryland
- County: Howard
- Founded: 1772
- Incorporated: 1867–1935
- Historic District: 1973–present
- Founded by: John, Andrew, and Joseph Ellicott

Government
  - Type: County council
  - Councilman: Liz Walsh; District 1

Area
  - Total: 30.13 sq mi (78.04 km^{2})
  - Land: 30.01 sq mi (77.72 km^{2})
  - Water: 0.12 sq mi (0.32 km^{2})
- Elevation: 180 ft (55 m)

Population (2020)
  - Total: 75,947
  - Density: 2,531.0/sq mi (977.22/km^{2})
- Time zone: UTC−5 (Eastern (EST))
  - Summer (DST): UTC−4 (EDT)
- ZIP Codes: 21041–21043
- Area codes: 410, 443, and 667
- FIPS code: 24-26000
- GNIS feature ID: 0584282

Ellicott City (/ˈɛlɪkət/ EL-ih-kət) is an unincorporated community and census-designated place in and the county seat of Howard County, Maryland, United States. Part of the Baltimore metropolitan area, its population was 75,947 at the 2020 census, making it the most populous unincorporated county seat in the United States.

Ellicott City's historic downtown – the Ellicott City Historic District – lies in the valleys of the Tiber and Patapsco rivers. The historic district includes the Ellicott City Station; it is the oldest surviving train station in the United States, having been built in 1830 as the first terminus of the original B&O Railroad line. The historic district of the town is often called "Historic Ellicott City" or "Old Ellicott City" to distinguish it from the surrounding suburbs that extend south to Columbia and west to West Friendship.

== History ==
=== Milling ===
Prior to the establishment of Ellicott City, the main crossing of the Patapsco River connecting Baltimore with western Maryland stood about three miles north at what is now Hollifield (Old Frederick Road and Johnnycake Road). The main road continued west towards Mount Airy and Frederick along what later became Maryland Route 99. The first mill at that site on the river had been built by Christopher Gardiner in about 1716. Near this place, in 1766, James Hood used the Maryland Mill Act of 1669 to condemn 20 acres (8.1 ha) for a mill site adjacent to his river-side 157-acre (64 ha) property, where he built a gristmill. His son Benjamin rebuilt the corn grinding mill after one of the frequent Patapsco floods in 1768.

On April 24, 1771, three Quaker brothers from Bucks County, Pennsylvania, north of Philadelphia, chose the picturesque wilderness several miles upriver from Elk Ridge Landing (today's Elkridge, Maryland), the uppermost part of the river then navigable by tobacco-loading sailing merchant ships in the 18th century, to establish a flour mill, purchasing 50 acres (20 ha) of Baltimore County land from Emanuel Teal and 35 acres (14 ha) from William Williams. John, Andrew, and Joseph Ellicott founded Ellicott's Mills, which became one of the largest milling and manufacturing towns in the East.

In 1774, Joseph Ellicott purchased Hood's Mill for 1,700 pounds, which became known as "Ellicott's Upper Mills". In 1775 the brothers expanded their holdings with 30.5 acres (12.3 ha) from Bartholomew Balderson. Nathaniel sold his partnership in 1777, and Joseph sold all but his Hood's Mill ownership the next year. With the development of Ellicott's Mills, the main road connecting Baltimore to the west shifted southward from the Upper Mills to the Lower Mills at Ellicott City. This route later was incorporated into the Baltimore and Frederick-Town Turnpike and the National Road.

The town retained the name "Ellicott's Mills" when the U.S. Postal stop opened on October 7, 1797.

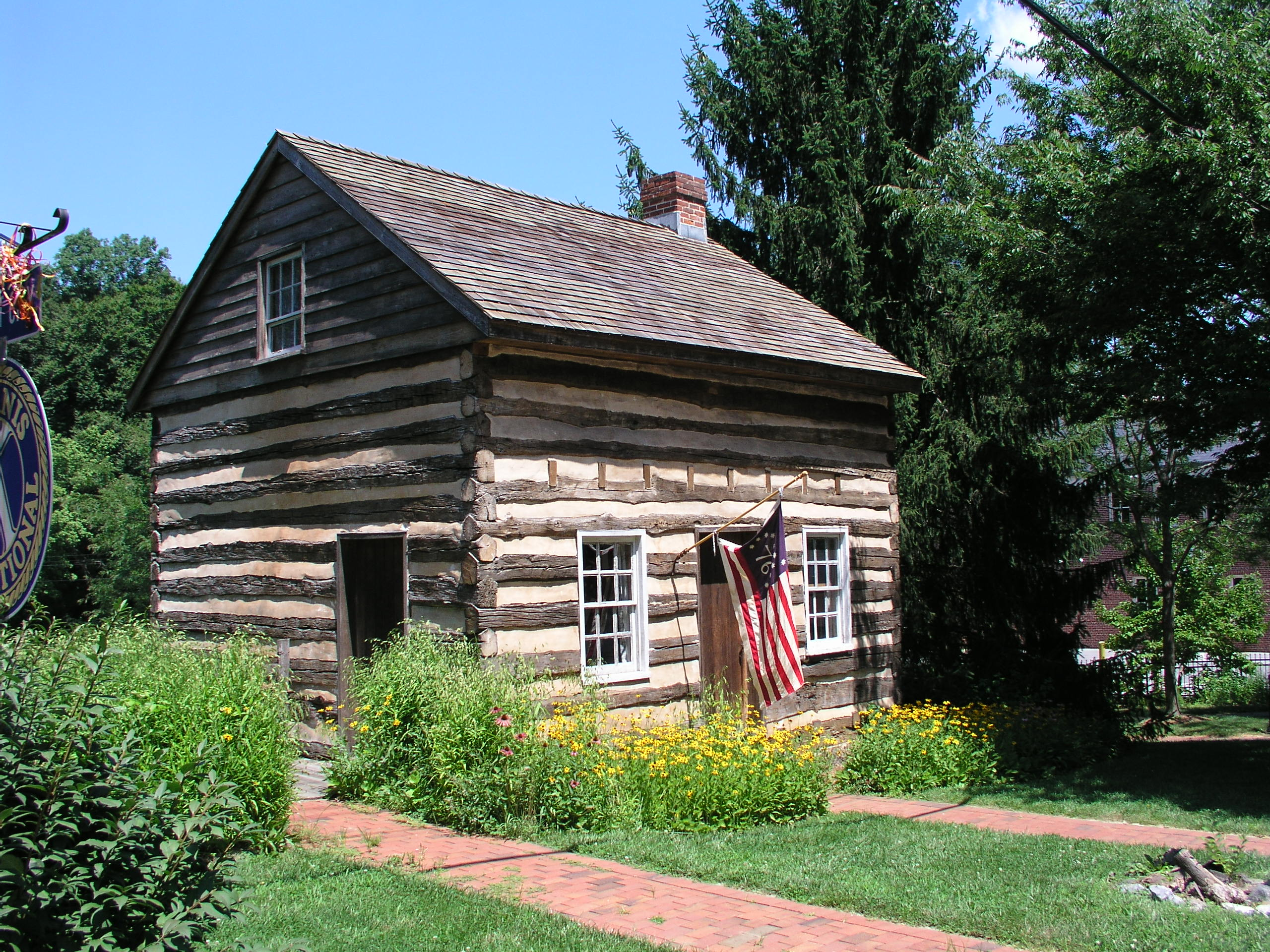
Thomas Isaac log cabin. Named after a 19th-century owner, the cabin was believed to have been built circa 1780 by an early Ellicott's Mills settler.

The Ellicott brothers constructed sawmills, smithies, stables, an oil mill, a grain distillery, and grain mills. They helped revolutionize farming in the area by persuading farmers to plant wheat instead of tobacco and also by introducing Plaster of Paris fertilizer to revitalize depleted soil. The Ellicotts produced the product until a fire on January 11, 1809. Charles Carroll of Carrollton (1737–1832), the last surviving signer of the Declaration of Independence, a rare Roman Catholic and a wealthy landowner with the largest fortune then in colonial America, was an early influential convert from tobacco to wheat. By 1830, the founders' families could no longer support operations, and by 1840, the Ellicott family sold off their interests in the two flour mills, the granite quarry, the saw mill and plaster mill.

=== Rail ===
In 1830, Ellicott's Mills became the first terminus of the Baltimore and Ohio Railroad outside Baltimore, the first commercially operated cargo and passenger railroad in the country. The B&O was organized in 1827 and had its "first stone" laid the following year with major ceremonies on July 4, Independence Day, with the beginning of construction. The Ellicott City Station, built on an embankment across the corner of the town and along the Patapsco River and intersecting Tiber Creek stream, with its "Oliver Viaduct", named for a B&O board member Robert Oliver crossing over the National Road of large blocks of locally quarried gray granite, stands today as a living history museum, and has been designated a National Historic Landmark by the U.S. Department of the Interior, administered by the National Park Service. It bears the designation as the "Oldest surviving railroad station in America". In 1829, New York industrialist and Baltimore foundry-owner Peter Cooper began testing his iron steam engine, Tom Thumb (1791–1883), on the B&O Railway. This was the first time a steam locomotive was used to transport persons over rails in the United States. The famous race between Tom Thumb and a horse-drawn rail carriage took place between Relay Junction on the return trip from Ellicott's Mills towards Baltimore in August 1830. Even though the horse won the race due to a sudden broken drive belt on the Tom Thumb, it heralded the time when steam engines steadily improved, and the soon-to-be steam-operated railroad became a vital link in the town's economy and later expanding to the city of Baltimore's economic supremacy along with the state in the nation.

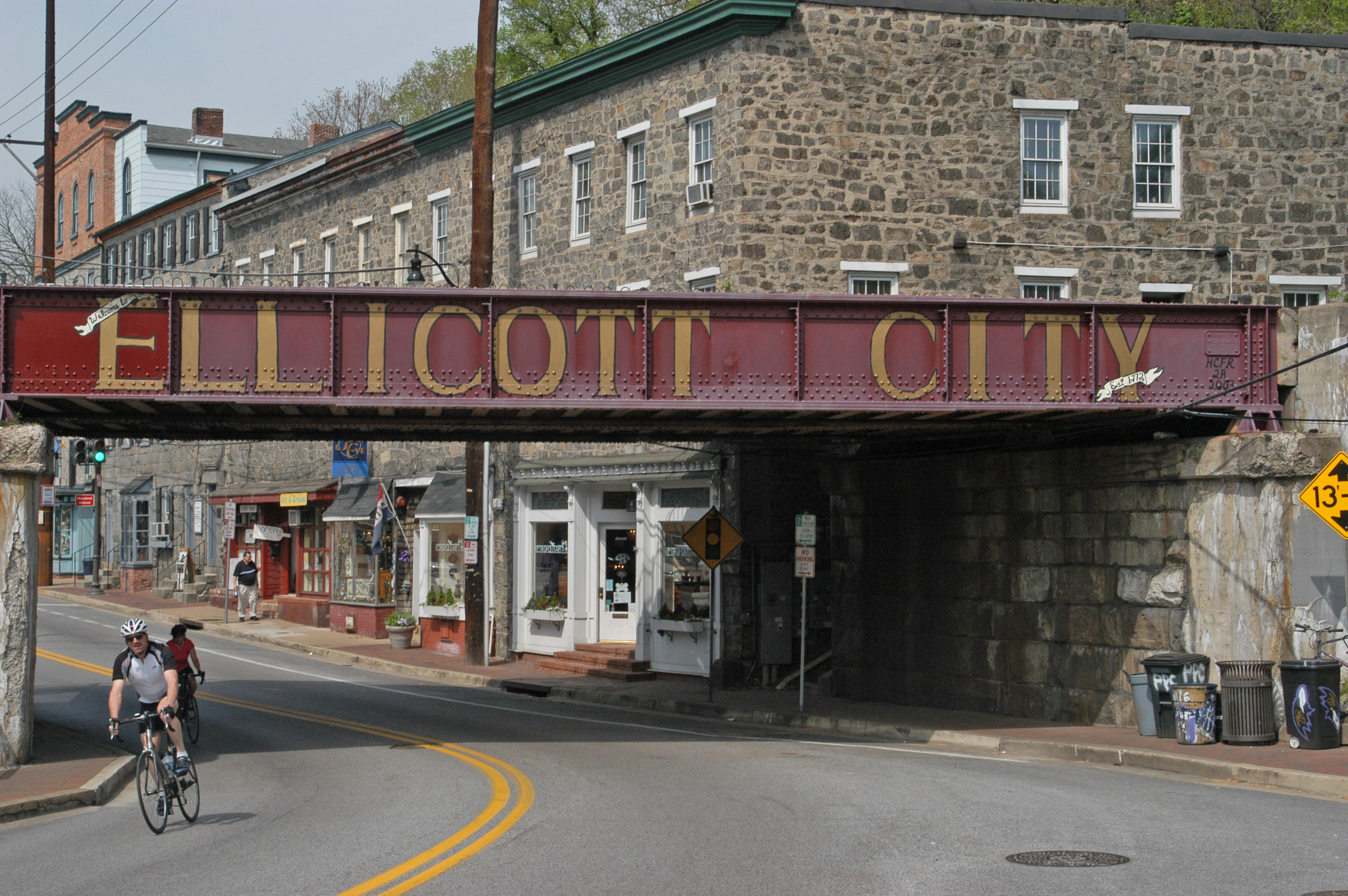
B&O Railroad Bridge over Main Street.

The site of the Howard County Courthouse, which was built from 1840 to 1843 in the former western Howard District of Anne Arundel County, Maryland, was so designated for the new temporary district in 1839, and continued and was expanded later when Howard County became an official independent jurisdiction in 1851, as one of the 23 counties (plus Baltimore as an independent city) in the state of Maryland. The town in 1851 was in a spate of depression as low costs shut the Maryland Machine Manufacturing Company. Over 80 vacant dwellings lined the Howard County side of the river. By 1861, Ellicott's Mills was a prosperous farming and manufacturing area.

At the start of the Civil War on April 19, 1861, "Gaithers Raiders", part of the Confederate "Howard County Dragoons" from Oakland Manor, marched through Ellicott's Mills to Baltimore, responding to the Baltimore riot of 1861, before heading south to join J. E. B. Stuart. Later that month, Union Army troops seized the "Winans Steam Gun" which had been en route to Harpers Ferry, Virginia, at Ellicott's Mills. The experimental gun had been developed by local Southern-sympathizer railroad builder and industrialist Ross Winans. In the fall of 1862, the 12th New Jersey Volunteer Infantry was assigned to guard Ellicott's Mills, setting up the 1,200-man Camp Johnson on the lawn of the nearby Patapsco Female Institute. On July 10, 1864, the third Confederate invasion of the North, led by General Jubal Early, forced the retreat of the Federal troops under the command of General Lew Wallace down the National Pike from the Battle of the Monocacy to the B.& O.'s Ellicott's Mills station and to Baltimore. The one-day delay by Wallace's small force at Monocacy Junction enabled Lt. Gen. Ulysses S. Grant to rush troops in time to defend the U.S. capital. Homes and churches in Ellicott's Mills were temporarily used as hospitals for the Union wounded.

In 1866, cholera broke out. In the same year, the Granite Mills cotton factory owned by Benjamin Detford burned down.

=== Incorporation and disincorporation ===
In 1867, a city incorporation charter was secured for Ellicott's Mills forming a local government with a mayor and council, and the name was changed to "Ellicott City".

The first mayor was E. A. Talbot, who lived in a stone house and operated a lumber yard at the base of the river. His business was washed away in the flood of 1866, and again in 1868. He was offered a clear title on his home from his opponent Issacs if he threw his reelection, which he did. Talbot relocated uphill to a brick and granite store designed by Charles Timanus that houses the Ellicott City Brewing Company today.

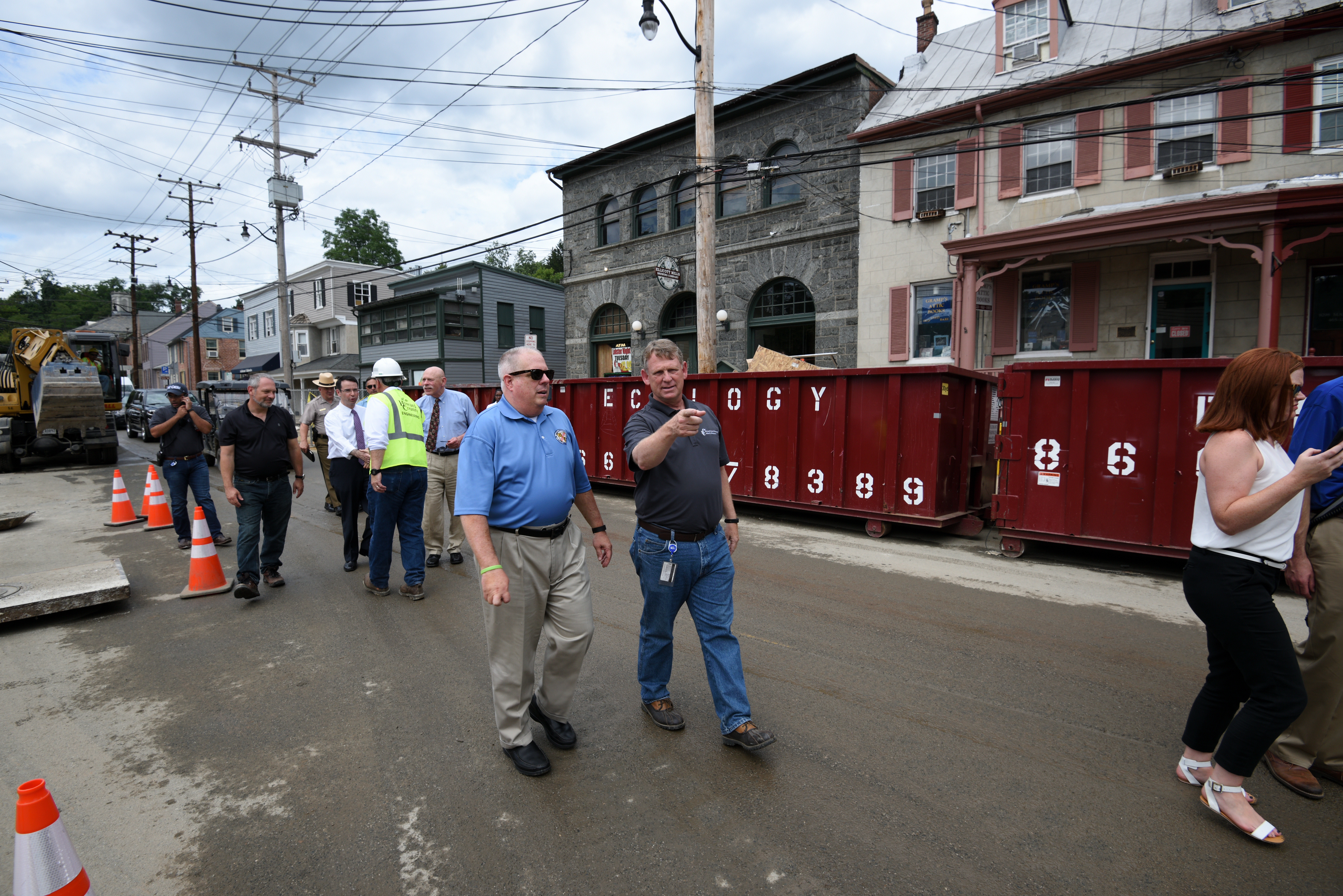
Governor of Maryland Larry Hogan tours Ellicott City, viewing damage left by the 2016 floods, accompanied by county executive Allan Kittleman.

Howard County built its first jailhouse, the Ellicott City Jail, also called Emory Jail or Willow Grove, on Emory Avenue in 1878. The stone jail intended for 12 inmates operated until the Howard County Detention Center opened in 1983.

In 1879, political gangs controlled the polling locations, shooting and wounding African American Ellicott City voters. The deputy sheriff declined to arrest the leaders for fear of his life and further outbreaks of violence.

In H. L. Mencken's best-selling memoir Happy Days, 1880–1892, he described his childhood in the chapter "Rural Delights" while living with his parents in their rented home in Ellicott City.

Ellicott City favored the temperance movement, enacting a law against "spiritous, fermented or intoxicating liquors" in 1882, taking effect May 1, 1883. This was shortly changed to limit sales of liquor to licensed shops that did not sell other goods, providing the primary source of the town's tax income.

Trolley service was proposed from Baltimore to Ellicott City in 1892, approved on April 20, 1895, and implemented in 1899. The service ran a double-ended streetcar for most of its service life until 1955, when the Baltimore Service commission recommended a bus replacement, which lasted only two years. The Catonsville & Ellicott City Electric Railway Company rail line was later converted to a hiking trail.

In February 1895, shop owner Daniel F. Shea was murdered by Jacob Henson. Henson was tried and sentenced to death. Fearing that Governor Brown might release Henson due to insanity, a group of residents broke into the jail and lynched Henson on Merricks Lane with a sign saying "Brown cannot rule our cort". Governor Brown condemned the citizens and ordered all prisoners sentenced to death be sent to the Maryland Penitentiary from then on.

After a difficult start in 1896, granite mining was started.

In 1907, Taylor Manor started as the Patapsco Manor Sanitarium built on property along New Cut Road. In 1939 the facility was purchased by Issac Taylor and run as the Pinel Clinic. Taylor operated an optometrist business and Taylor's Furniture on Main Street. In 1948 the facility expanded to 48 beds, and in 1968 it expanded to 151 beds. The modernist circular rotunda stands out at the center of campus. Taylor Manor covered more than 70 acres (28 ha). In 2000, the facility became a branch of Sheppard and Enoch Pratt Hospital.

In 1924, the Display Machine Doughnut Corporation moved to Ellicott City from New York, occupying the site of the 1916 Patapsco Flouring Mill built on the ruins of the former Elicott and Gambrill's mills. The company made doughnut mix and doughnut manufacturing machines as the Doughnut Corporation of America.

The only chartered city in the county, Ellicott City lost its charter in 1935 with a proposal from Senator Joseph Donovan, as the tax base from saloon fees lost in Prohibition caused citizen protest when taxes were shifted to residents.

On April 27, 1941, a fire gutted the eight-story doughnut factory, but it rebuilt, providing doughnut mixes to WWII troops. In January 1942, an emergency room was set up in the post office for civilian defense for the ongoing war effort.

In 1943, the Metropolitan District was formed to bring water and sewer to Ellicott City, sponsored by newspaperman P.G. Stromberg, I.H. Taylor, Charles E. Miller, Marray G. Peddicord, John A. Lane, and W. Emil Thompson.

=== Suburban development ===
In 1955, County Commissioner Norman E. Moxley created the city's first major subdivision, Normandy Heights. The first major shopping center, Normandy Shopping Center, was constructed. Alda Hopkins Clark purchased the Ellicott City First Presbyterian Church to donate it to the Howard County Historical Society.

In 1958, The Goddess, a film loosely based on Marilyn Monroe's life, was shot on location in the city.

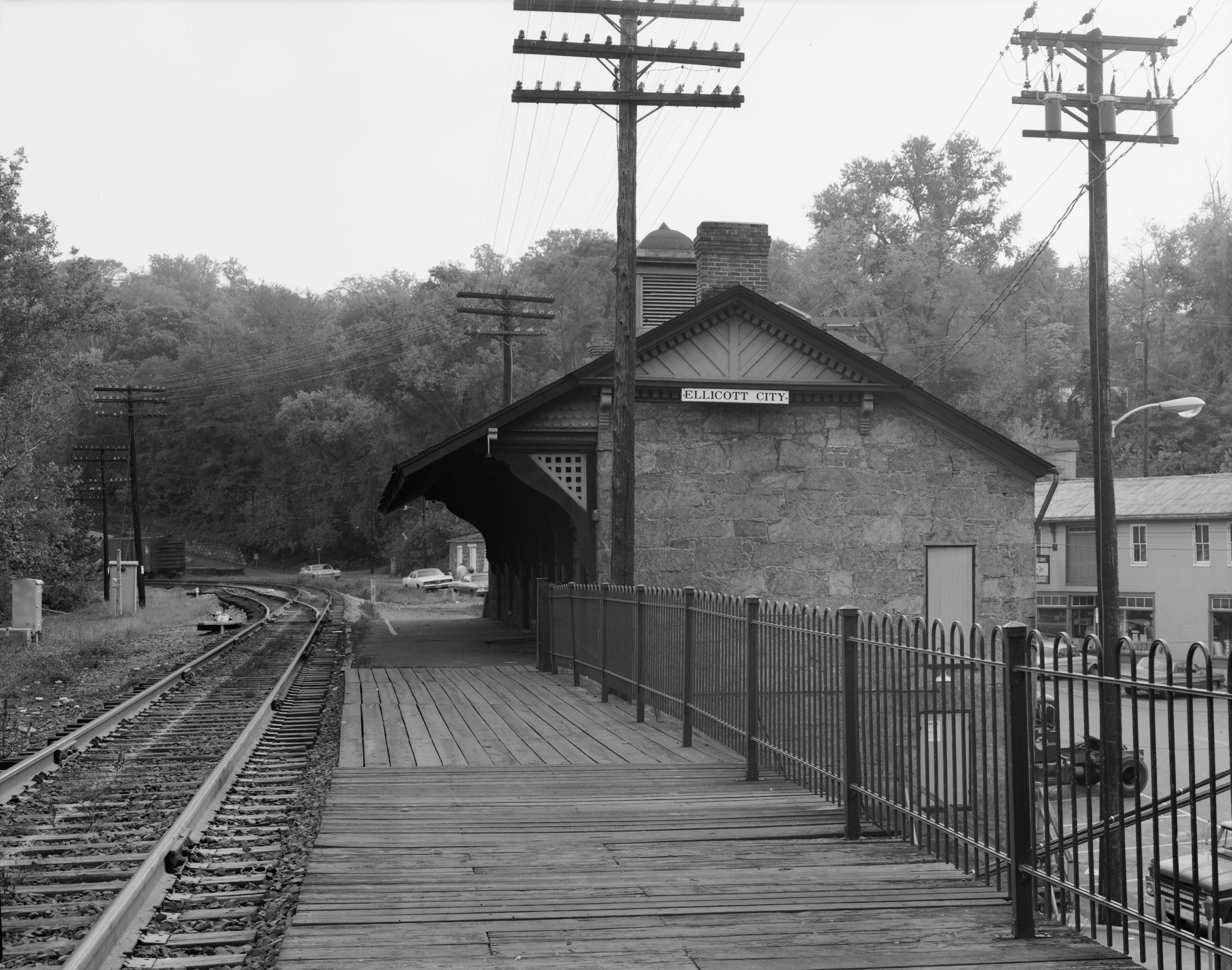
Ellicott City Station, 1970

Before 1962, the only polling location for Howard County voters was in Ellicott City. In May 1962, voters were offered a second location to vote, also in Ellicott City at the National Armory on Montgomery Road.

The same year, the state health department ordered the city to stop dumping its raw sewage into the Patuxent River and develop a modern septic system.

In 1964, the Corinthian Conservation Company was proposed to operate a Title I private-nonprofit partnership to implement a slum eradication program in Ellicott City, demolishing residences, and replacing them with 75% federal-funded apartment complexes.

In 1977, the county chose a site outside of the city for a new landfill, leading to the closure of the local New Cut Road landfill which served the county from 1944 until May 1980 for trash and hazardous materials. The New Cut landfill became the Worthington Dog Park. In 2011, a portion of the former 83-acre (34 ha) landfill site was developed with a $462,000 grant from the Maryland Energy Administration to build onsite solar arrays to power Worthington Elementary.

Ellicott City has historically been home to a population of poverty-class and working-class Appalachian and Southern migrants who came north looking for jobs. Many were factory workers who subsequently worked in the mills of Ellicott City. Many of the Appalachian migrants came from the mountains of Tennessee, earning Ellicott City the nickname "Little Sneedville", after the town of Sneedville, Tennessee, where many of the migrants had come from. By the mid-1980s, the "hillbilly" community had faded. Many of the migrants from Tennessee returned, while others lived in apartments along Route 40. By 1985, Ellicott City had experienced gentrification, becoming associated with antique shopping.

Historic Main Street has been the site of several devastating fires, most notably in November 1984, three in 1992 and again on November 9, 1999. The 1984 fire was started by Leidig's Bakery's faulty air conditioning unit and destroyed six buildings; the 1992 fires were by arson, and the 1999 six-alarm blaze which destroyed five businesses and caused an estimated $2 million in damage was accidentally started behind a restaurant by a discarded cigarette.

The fairy tale-themed amusement park, the Enchanted Forest, was located in the western part of the area. The park closed to the general public since the early 1990s. A shopping center (called the Enchanted Forest Shopping Center) was built on its parking lot. Many of the attractions have been moved to Clark's Elioak Farm in a rural area in the southwest corner of the Ellicott City CDP, where they are being restored. The Enchanted Forest was featured in the 1990 John Waters-directed film Cry-Baby.

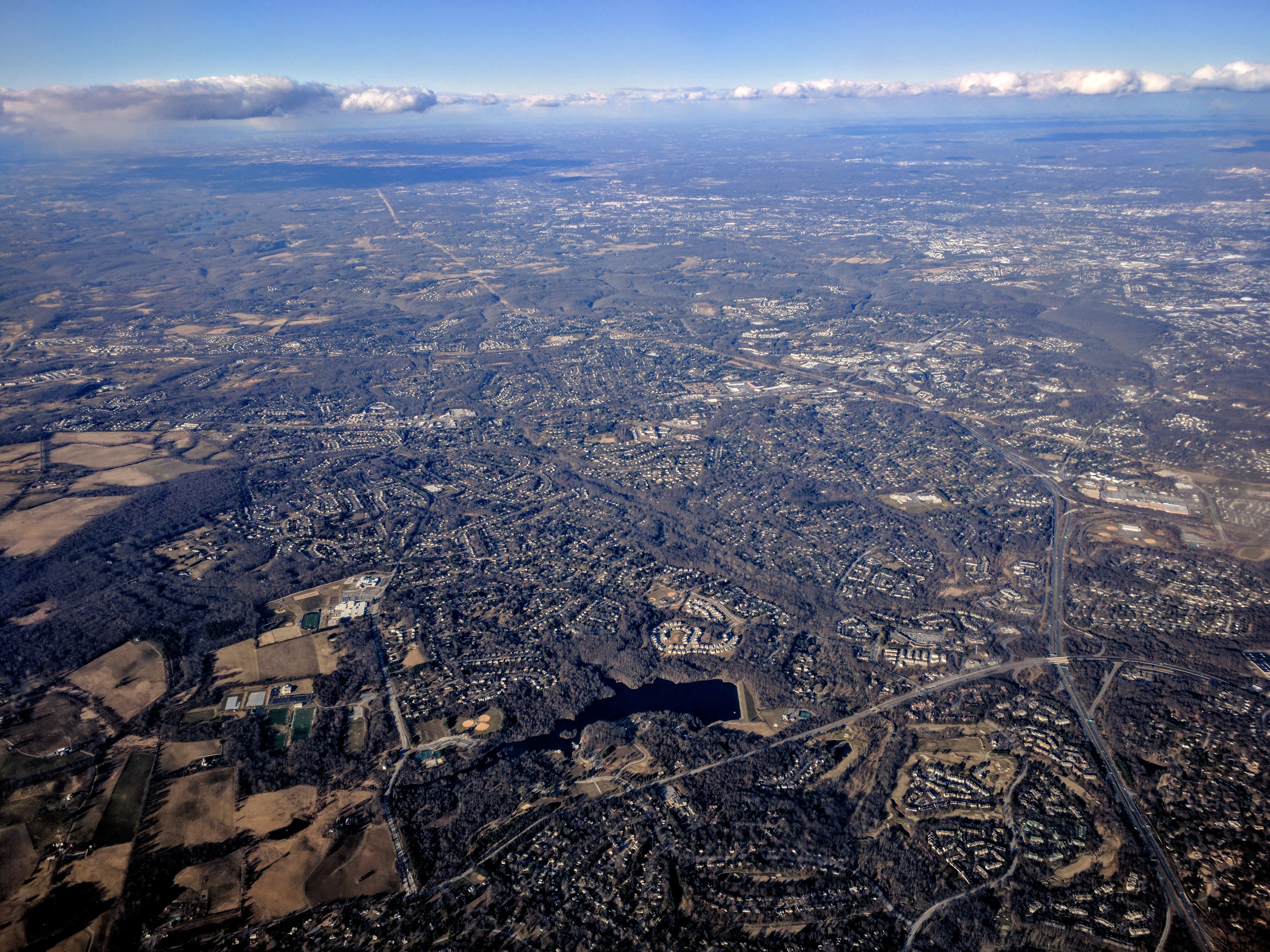
Aerial view from the south, 2017, including Centennial Lake

At midnight on August 21, 2012, a CSX coal train derailed on the Old Main Line Subdivision. Two 19-year-old women who were sitting on the railroad bridge over Main Street were killed when coal was dumped on them.

In 2012, the Forest Diner closed, ending a 66-year business as a traditional polished metal roadside diner, making way for 38 apartments.

In 2014, the Hiene House and Ellicott City Jail were placed on the Preserve Howard top-ten most endangered list due to walkway and parking lot construction plans.

In 2015, Ellicott City was inducted as a new member of Tree City USA.

=== Koreatown ===
Ellicott City has been home to a large Korean population along its Route 40 corridor, where numerous Korean-owned businesses and restaurants operate. Around 12,000 Korean-Americans currently live in Howard County, officials say. In Ellicott City, they make up 24 percent of the population. In 2017, Governor Larry Hogan dedicated a section of Route 40 from Rogers Avenue to Greenway Drive as "Korean Way", paying homage to the community's Korean culture. Ellicott City's Koreatown has been widely recognized for revitalizing declining shopping centers along the U.S. highway.

=== Floods ===
The town is prone to flooding from the Patapsco River and its tributary the Tiber River. These floods have had a major impact on the history of the town, often destroying important businesses and killing many. Ellicott City has had major devastating floods in 1780, 1817, 1837, 1868, 1901, 1917, 1923, 1938, 1942, 1952, 1956, 1972 (Hurricane Agnes), 1975 (Hurricane Eloise), 1989, 2011, 2016, and 2018. The 1868 flood washed away 14 houses, killing 39 to 43 (accounts vary) in and around Ellicott City. It wiped out the Granite Manufacturing Cotton Mill, Charles A. Gambrill's Patapsco Mill, John Lee Carroll's mill buildings, and dozens of homes. One mill was rebuilt by Charles Gambrill, which remained in operation until a fire in 1916.

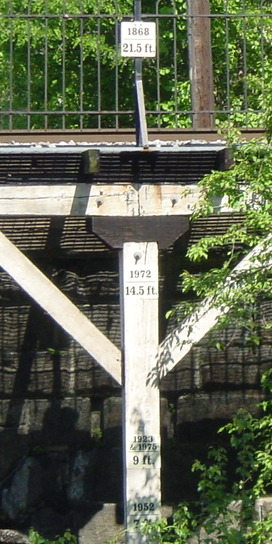
Historic flood stages marked on the B&O viaduct, c. 2006. Hurricane Agnes flood stage (14.5 feet (4.4 m)) is in the middle of the photograph.

A 1923 flood topped bridges, in 1952 an 8-foot (2.4 m) wall of water swept the shops of Ellicott City, and a 1956 flood inflicted heavy damage at the Bartigis Brothers plant. On June 21, 1972, the Patapsco River valley flooded 14.5 feet (4.4 m) from the remnants of Hurricane Agnes, taking out a concrete bridge, destroying the Jonathan Ellicott home, and the 1910 Victor Blode water filtration plant, and flooding Main Street to the Odd Fellows hall. The Old Main Line of the B&O Railroad also sustained serious damage.

On September 27, 1975, the town was flooded 9.0 feet (2.7 m) from Hurricane Eloise. Floods also occurred September 22, 1989, from Hurricane Hugo, and on September 7, 2011, flooding 11.0 feet (3.4 m) from Tropical Storm Lee.

==== 2016 flood ====
On July 30, 2016, a storm dropped 6 inches (150 mm) of rain in two hours on the community. The resulting flash flood caused severe damage in historic Ellicott City, especially along Main Street. Many homes, roads, businesses, sidewalks, and more were destroyed by the flooding, including the town's landmark clock. A state of emergency was declared, and two people died as a result of the flooding.

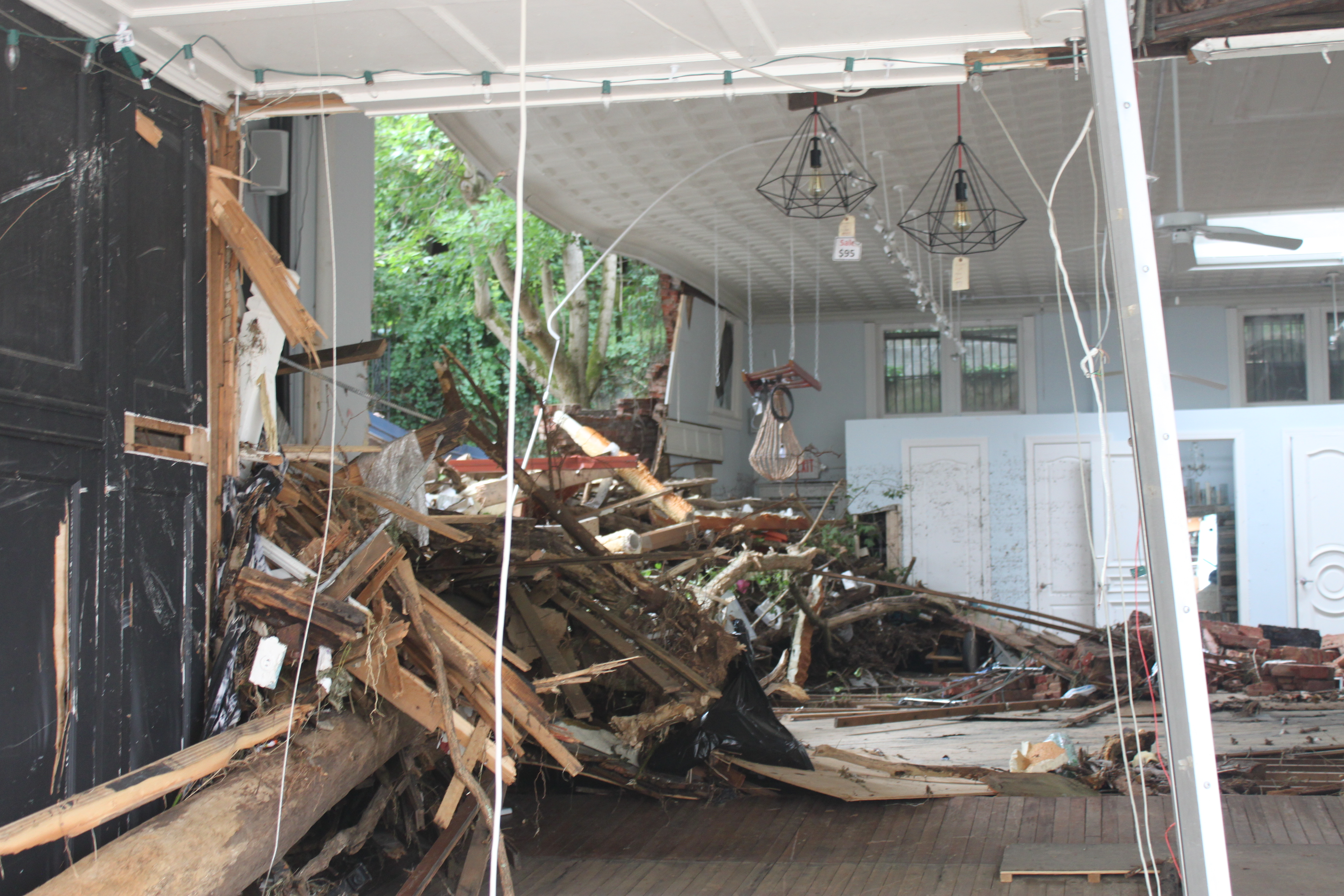
Damage to Old Ellicott City from the 2016 flood

==== 2018 flood ====
On the afternoon of May 27, 2018, historic Main Street flooded again, after the region received over eight inches of rain in the span of two hours, just days before the new flood emergency alert system was to become operational. Homes, businesses, and infrastructure, including roads and the town's clock, were again damaged or destroyed. One person died, a National Guard member swept away while trying to save others.

==== Flood control ====
In 2017, the Ellicott City Watershed Master Plan was unveiled, but after the 2018 flood, the plans had to be re-evaluated. A $140 million multi-tiered five-year plan was chosen by County officials. The plan includes building a tunnel requiring the removal of nine historic structures.

The removal of the buildings was opposed by preservationists as well as residents and Howard County Executive Calvin Ball. Ball halted the work of Kittleman to study five plans. One would involve removing six buildings and another only four buildings. Two plans called for boring underground tunnels that was considered too expensive.

The plan chosen involves tearing down four buildings and boring a 15-foot diameter tunnel through 1,600 feet of the granite hillside. Ten buildings were purchased and six will be stabilized and restored. The plan was not to solve the flood problem but mitigate it from over four feet to under one foot of flooding on the streets.

The removal and construction work began in January 2024, and was completed in summer 2024. The partial removal and renovation of the other six is still underway as of February 2025.

== Geography ==
Ellicott City is in northeastern Howard County, bordered to the east and north by the Patapsco River, which forms the Baltimore County line. The Ellicott City census-designated place (CDP) extends to the northwest beyond Marriottsville Road and to the southwest beyond Centennial Road. It is bordered to the south by Columbia at Maryland Route 108 and to the southeast by Ilchester at Maryland Route 104 and Bonnie Branch Road. According to the United States Census Bureau, the CDP has a total area of 30.1 square miles (77.9 km^{2}), of which 30.0 square miles (77.6 km^{2}) are land and 0.1 square miles (0.3 km^{2}), or 0.41%, are water.

Ellicott City is claimed to be built on seven hills. These hills lie southeast of the Historic District, which is in the Tiber River valley immediately west of the Patapsco River. The Tiber River is a small tributary of the Patapsco that forms the narrow valley followed by Main Street. Several deep stream valleys converge at this location, which increases the risk of flooding, but at the same time creates the town's heights.

The heart of the Historic District is Main Street, where the oldest structures of the town stand. Smaller neighborhoods within the district include Tonge Row (also spelled Tongue Row) adjacent to Old Columbia Pike, and the West End, at the western end of Main Street.

=== Neighborhoods ===
The remainder of the Ellicott City CDP ("Greater Ellicott City") includes the neighborhoods of:

- Oella (Baltimore County)
- Dorsey's Search
- Centennial
- Elioak
- Turf Valley
- Font Hill
- Dunloggin
- Waverly
- Mount Hebron
- Saint Johns Lane
- Bethgate
- Valley Mede
- Bethany Manor
- Normandy
- Linwood
- Long Gate
- Taylor Village
- Worthington
- Brampton Hills
- Montgomery Meadows
- Jonestown
- Ilchester
- Wheatfield

=== Geology ===
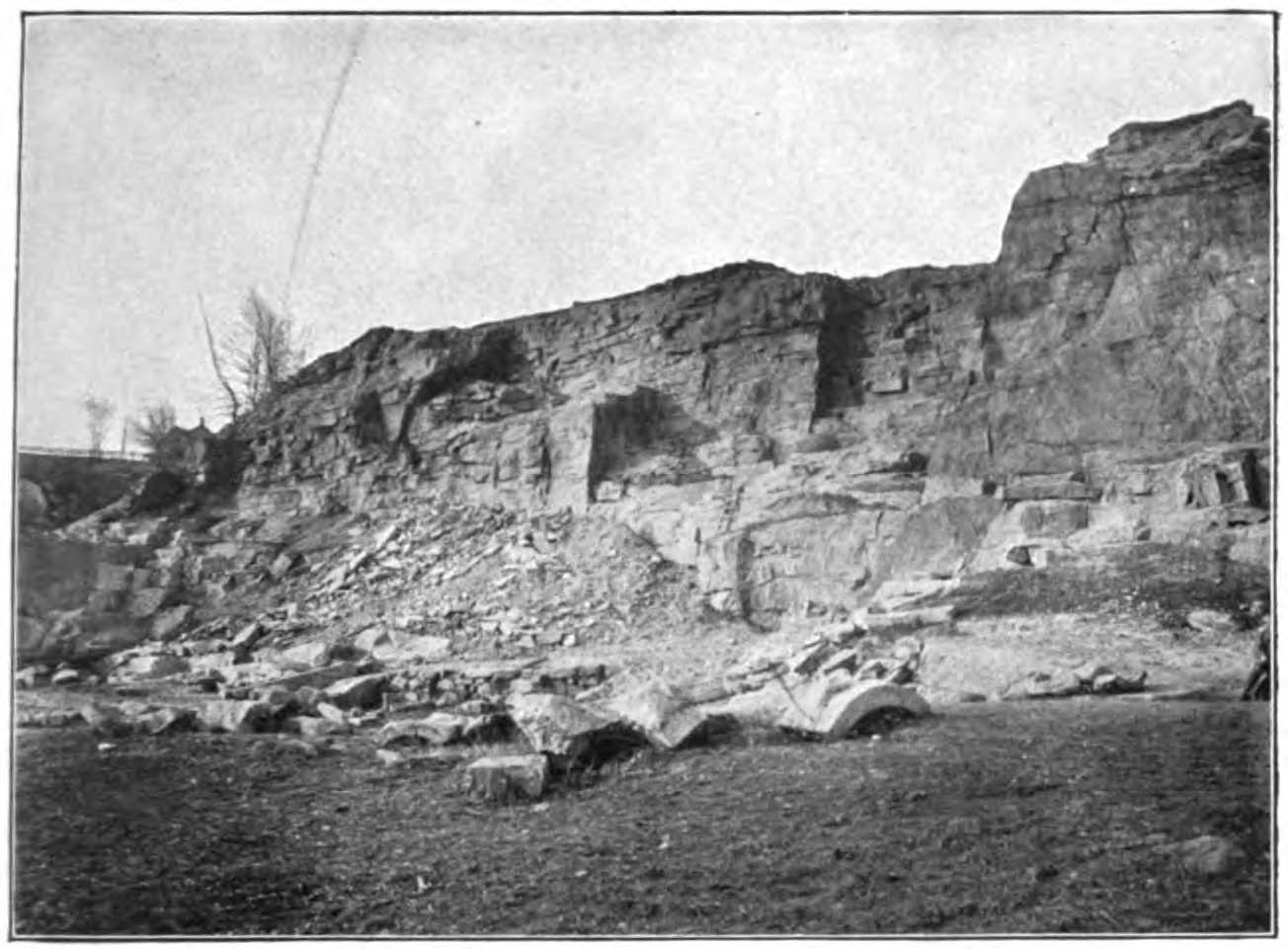
Gaither's Quarry, Ellicott City, photographed approximately 1898

Historic Ellicott City sits on the Silurian or Ordovician Ellicott City Granodiorite. Outcrops can be seen lining Main Street. Several granite quarries were in operation in Ellicott City in the late 1800s and early 1900s.

=== Climate ===
Summers are hot and humid, with frequent thunderstorms. Spring and fall bring pleasant temperatures. Winter is often considered chilly by U.S. standards, with lighter rain showers of longer duration. Sporadic snowfall can occur in winter, but is usually relatively light. The Köppen classification is humid subtropical. Rainfall is spread evenly throughout the year, with 3–5 inches (76–127 mm) falling each month.

Climate data for Ellicott City, MD
Month	Jan	Feb	Mar	Apr	May	Jun	Jul	Aug	Sep	Oct	Nov	Dec	Year
Record high °F (°C)	78 (26)	80 (27)	90 (32)	95 (35)	97 (36)	101 (38)	105 (41)	103 (39)	101 (38)	95 (35)	83 (28)	77 (25)	105 (41)
Mean daily maximum °F (°C)	42 (6)	46 (8)	55 (13)	67 (19)	76 (24)	84 (29)	88 (31)	86 (30)	79 (26)	68 (20)	57 (14)	46 (8)	66 (19)
Mean daily minimum °F (°C)	23 (−5)	25 (−4)	32 (0)	41 (5)	51 (11)	60 (16)	64 (18)	63 (17)	56 (13)	44 (7)	35 (2)	27 (−3)	43 (6)
Record low °F (°C)	−18 (−28)	−16 (−27)	−4 (−20)	12 (−11)	27 (−3)	34 (1)	44 (7)	41 (5)	29 (−2)	18 (−8)	3 (−16)	−14 (−26)	−18 (−28)
Average precipitation inches (mm)	3.74 (95)	3.01 (76)	4.30 (109)	3.52 (89)	4.78 (121)	4.11 (104)	3.85 (98)	3.53 (90)	4.09 (104)	3.44 (87)	3.73 (95)	3.53 (90)	45.63 (1,159)
Source: Intellicast

== Demographics ==
Historical population
Census	Pop.	Note	%±
1970	17,455		—
1980	21,784		24.8%
1990	41,396		90.0%
2000	52,978		28.0%
2010	65,834		24.3%
2020	75,947		15.4%

=== 2020 census ===
As of the 2020 census, Ellicott City had a population of 75,947. The median age was 41.6 years. 25.2% of residents were under the age of 18 and 17.6% of residents were 65 years of age or older. For every 100 females there were 92.8 males, and for every 100 females age 18 and over there were 89.6 males age 18 and over.

99.9% of residents lived in urban areas, while 0.1% lived in rural areas.

There were 26,692 households in Ellicott City, of which 40.6% had children under the age of 18 living in them. Of all households, 66.1% were married-couple households, 10.2% were households with a male householder and no spouse or partner present, and 20.8% were households with a female householder and no spouse or partner present. About 18.7% of all households were made up of individuals and 10.1% had someone living alone who was 65 years of age or older.

There were 27,657 housing units, of which 3.5% were vacant. The homeowner vacancy rate was 0.7% and the rental vacancy rate was 6.8%.

Racial composition as of the 2020 census
Race	Number	Percent
White	37,723	49.7%
Black or African American	7,279	9.6%
American Indian and Alaska Native	150	0.2%
Asian	24,675	32.5%
Native Hawaiian and Other Pacific Islander	14	0.0%
Some other race	1,249	1.6%
Two or more races	4,857	6.4%
Hispanic or Latino (of any race)	3,409	4.5%

=== 2010 census ===
As of the census of 2010, there were 65,834 people, 23,734 households, and 18,150 families residing in the CDP. The population density was 2,188.8 inhabitants per square mile (845.1/km^{2}). There were 24,672 housing units at an average density of 822.4 units per square mile (317.5 units/km^{2}). The racial makeup of the CDP was 64.5% White, 22.9% Asian, 8.5% African American, 0.2% Native American, 0.0% Pacific Islander, 1.1% some other race, and 2.8% from two or more races. Hispanic or Latino of any race were 3.5% of the population.

There were 23,734 households, out of which 39.1% had children under the age of 18 living with them, 65.2% were headed by married couples living together, 8.2% had a female householder with no husband present, and 23.5% were non-families. 19.7% of all households were made up of individuals, and 8.4% had someone living alone who was 65 years of age or older. The average household size was 2.76, and the average family size was 3.20.

In the CDP, the population was distributed by age with 26.5% under the age of 18, 6.5% from 18 to 24, 24.0% from 25 to 44, 30.9% from 45 to 64, and 12.1% who were 65 years of age or older. The median age was 40.7 years. For every 100 females, there were 95.0 males. For every 100 females age 18 and over, there were 91.5 males.

According to a 2007 estimate, the median income for a household in the CDP was $103,464, and the median income for a family was $120,064. Males had a median income of $63,938 versus $41,721 for females. The per capita income for the CDP was $29,287. About 2.2% of families and 3.3% of the population were below the poverty line, including 3.3% of those under age 18 and 4.9% of those age 65 or over.

=== 2000 census ===
As of the census of 2000, there were 56,397 people, 20,250 households, and 15,288 families residing in the town. The population density was 679.8 people/km^{2} (1,761 people/mi^{2}). There were 20,789 housing units at an average density of 250.6 units/km^{2} (649 units/mi^{2}). The racial makeup of the town was 78.33% White, 7.34% African American, 0.15% Native American, 11.90% Asian, 0.02% Pacific Islander, 0.55% from other races, and 1.71% from two or more races. 2.14% of the population were Hispanic or Latino of any race.

There were 20,250 households, out of which 41.2% had children under the age of 18 living with them, 65.3% were married couples living together, 7.6% had a female householder with no husband present, and 24.5% were non-families. 19.6% of all households were made up of individuals, and 5.7% had someone living alone who was 65 years of age or older. The average household size was 2.76 and the average family size was 3.22.

In the town the population was spread out, with 28.5% under the age of 18, 6.0% from 18 to 24, 30.8% from 25 to 44, 25.2% from 45 to 64, and 9.6% who were 65 years of age or older. The median age was 37 years. For every 100 females, there were 95.9 males. For every 100 females age 18 and over, there were 91.9 males.

The median income for a household in the town was $79,031, and the median income for a family was $91,968. Males had a median income of $63,938 versus $41,721 for females. The per capita income for the town was $33,316. 3.3% of the population and 2.2% of families were below the poverty line. Out of the total people living in poverty, 3.3% were under the age of 18 and 4.9% were 65 or older.

== Economy ==
=== Tourism ===
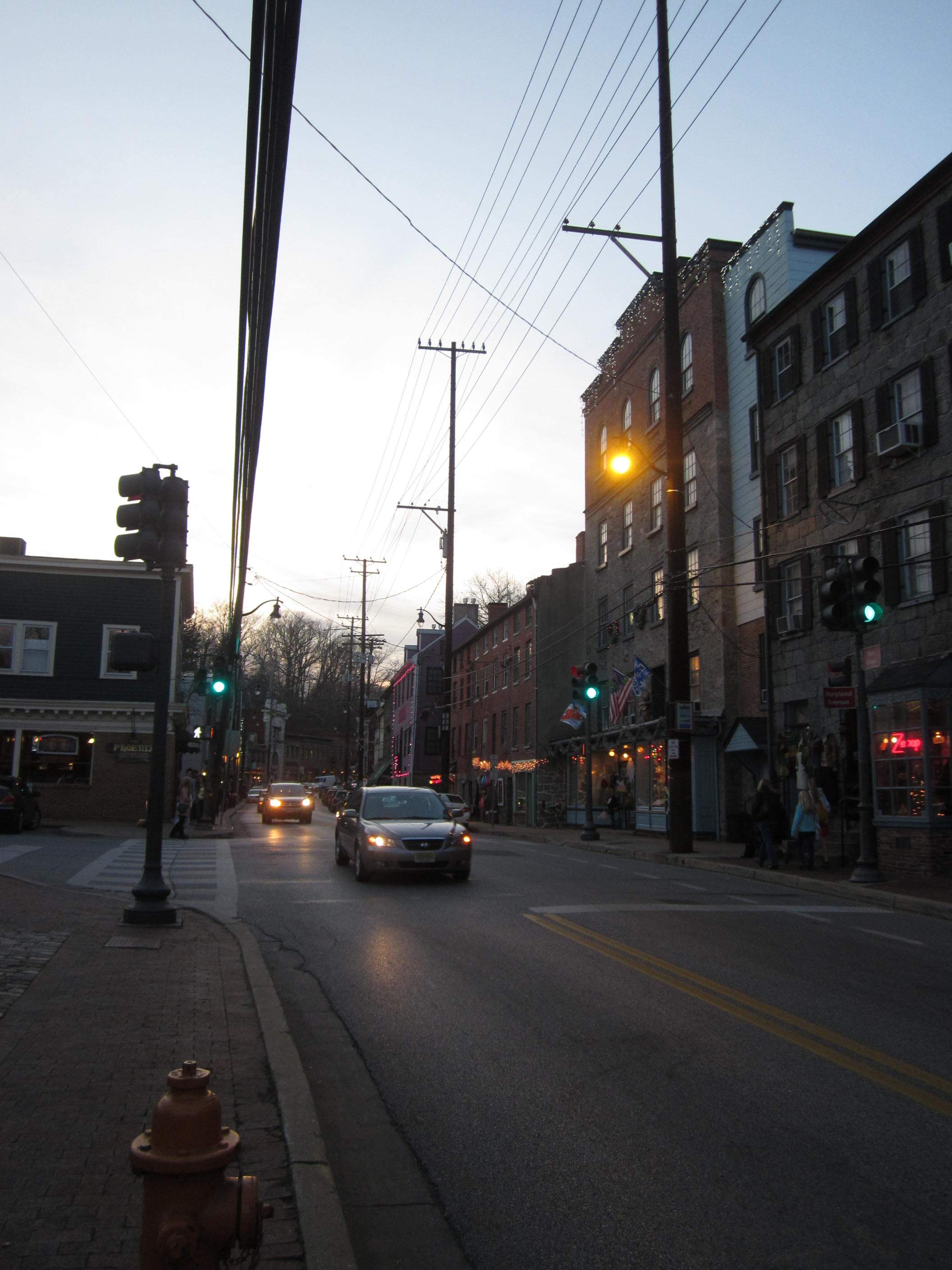
Main Street and Maryland Avenue in the Ellicott City Historic District

Ellicott City has been called one of the most haunted small towns on the East Coast. The Howard County Tourism Council runs a Ghost Tour that visits several places with reputations for paranormal activity. Among these are the mansions Lilburn, Hayden House, and Mt. Ida; the B&O railroad bridge that crosses Main Street in the center of the town; the old Ellicott City Firehouse; and the Patapsco Female Institute.

Tourist attractions include:

- Centennial Park
- Ellicott City Station
- Enchanted Forest
- Shrine of St. Anthony
- The Chesapeake Shakespeare Company
- Trolley Line Number 9 Trail

== Government ==
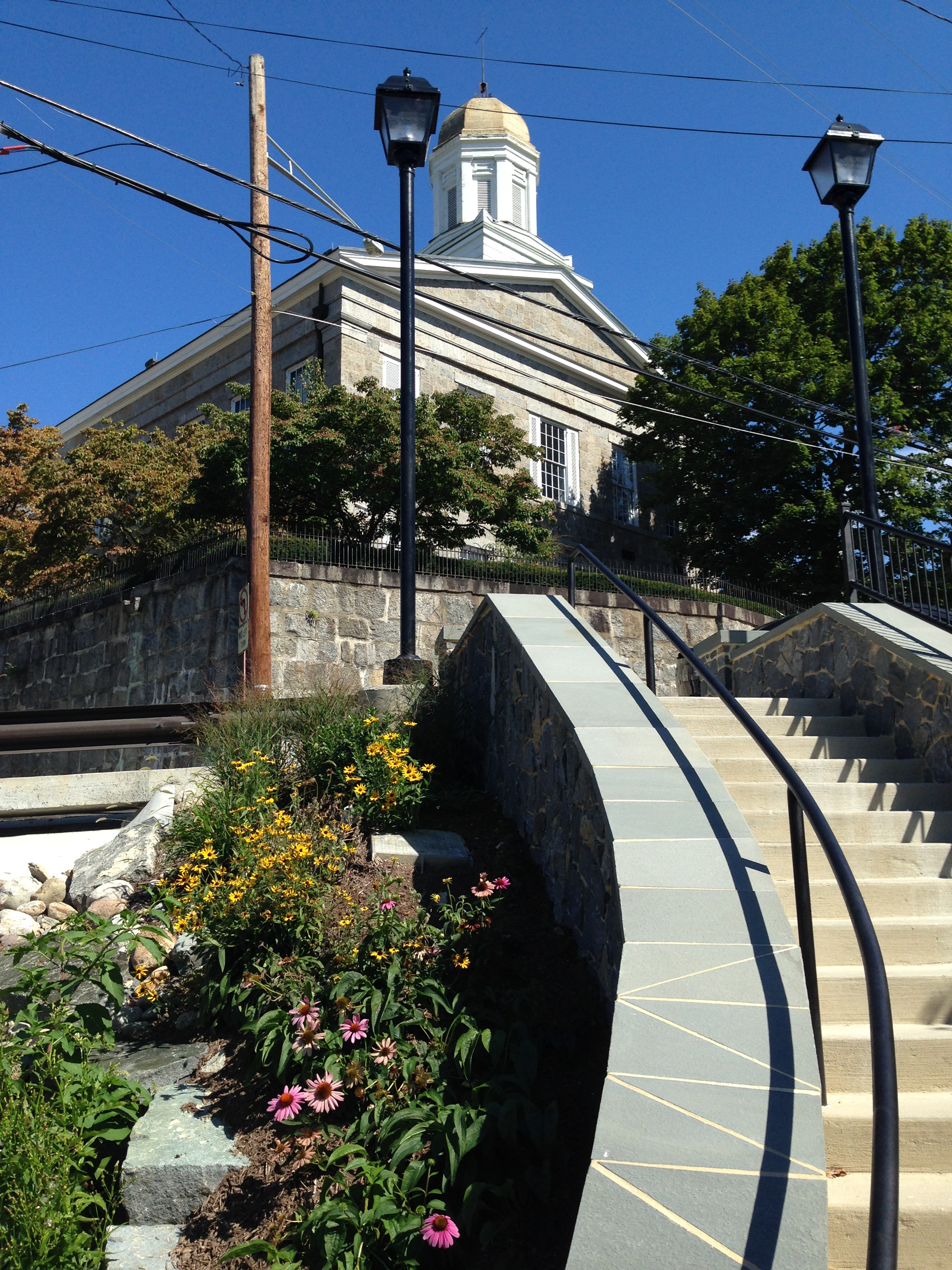
Howard County Courthouse viewed from the Main Street stairwell

=== Representation in Congress ===
From 2003 to 2023, Ellicott City was a part of Maryland's 7th congressional district, represented by Democrat Elijah Cummings until his death in 2019, followed by Kweisi Mfume until congressional redistricting.

Since 2023, Ellicott City, along with the rest of Howard County, has been a part of Maryland's 3rd congressional district, represented by Democrat Sarah Elfreth.

=== County government ===
Ellicott City houses numerous county offices, departments, and courthouses. The Howard County Circuit Courthouse, originally located on Court Avenue on a hilltop north of the downtown area, moved in 2021 to a new building adjacent to the Columbia Hills neighborhood. The Howard County District Courthouse is located close by on Martha Bush Drive, which houses district courtrooms and the county clerk's office. The County Executive and Council, along the departments of Community Services, Education, Elections, Employment, Health, Law Offices, Licensing, Natural Resources, Planning, Public Safety, Public Works, Recreation, and Transportation are located in the George Howard Government Campus on Court House Drive.

=== Police and fire ===
The Howard County Police Department headquarters is located in the George Howard Government Campus on Court House Drive. The Howard County Department of Fire and Rescue Services provides service from two stations in Ellicott City: Station 2 on Montgomery Road, and Station 8 on Old Frederick Road and Bethany Lane.

=== List of mayors ===
1. George Ellicott 1867
2. E. A. Talbot (served 2 terms) 1867–1868
3. Daniel J. McCaulty 1873
4. James E. Vansant before 1877
5. Christian Eckert 1890
6. Dr. Mordecai Gist Sykes 1893–?, 1922–? serving three times
7. Robert Yates 1900–?, 1904–?
8. Joseph H. Leishear 1907–1909
9. John H. Kraft 1909–?

== Education ==
Ellicott City proper is served by Mount Hebron High School, Centennial High School, Wilde Lake High School, and Howard High School in the Howard County Public School System; Marriotts Ridge High School and River Hill High School serve most of the rest of the CDP area. The Homewood Center and the system's other specialized school, along with the central offices, also have Ellicott City addresses, though in fact they are on the northern edge of Columbia.

Middle schools serving the CDP are Burleigh Manor, Dunloggin, Bonnie Branch, Mount View, Folly Quarter, Ellicott Mills and Patapsco. The elementary schools include Veterans, Ilchester, Northfield, Centennial Lane, Manor Woods, St. Johns Lane, Waverly, Worthington, Triadelphia Ridge, and Hollifield Station.

St. John's Parish Day School is located 1.5 miles (2.4 km) west of the town center, and Glenelg Country School is located at the western edge of the CDP.

== Transportation ==
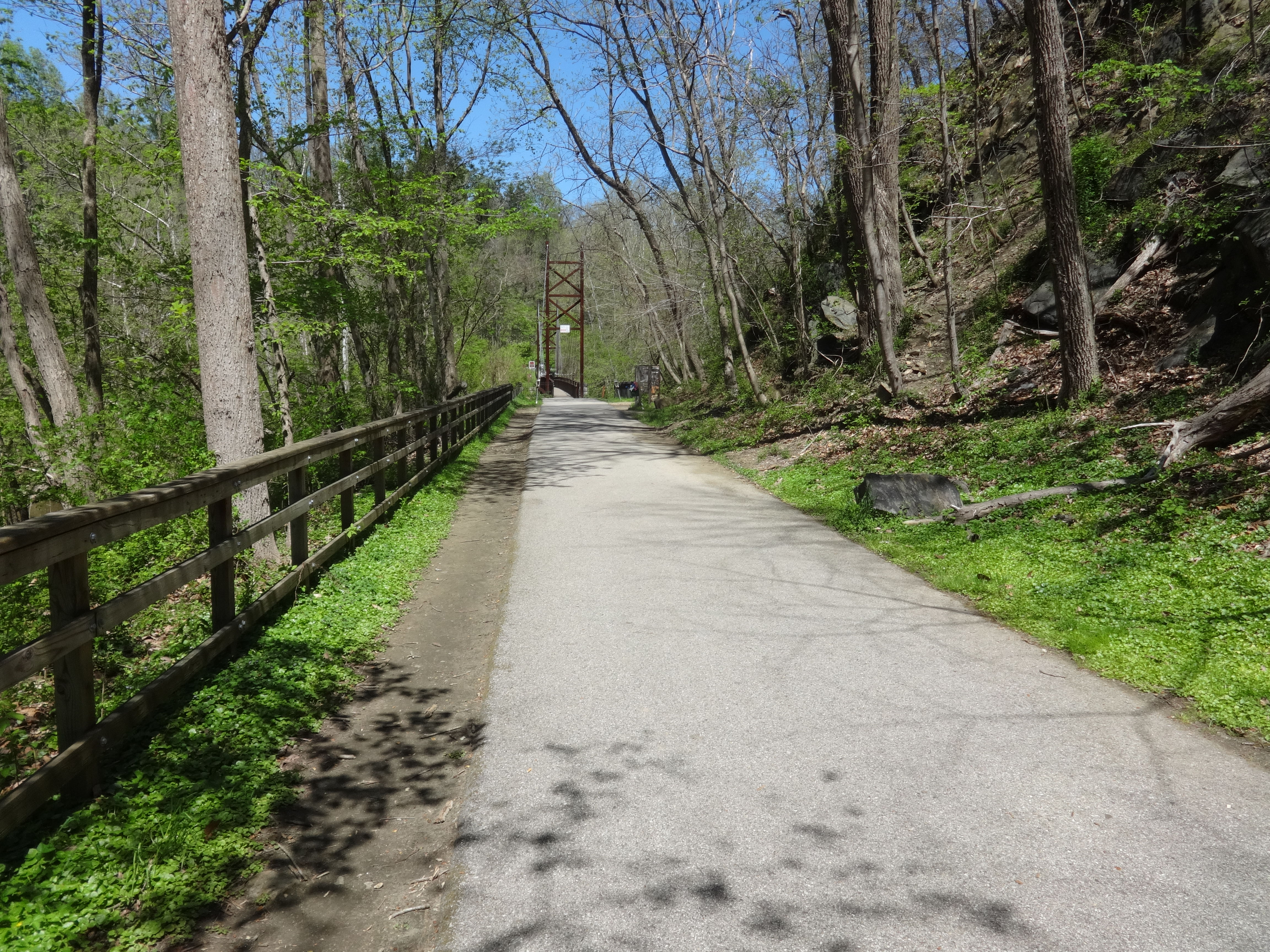
The Grist Mill Trail connects Ellicott City to Elkridge for pedestrians and cyclists.

=== Transit ===
Ellicott City is served by the Regional Transportation Agency of Central Maryland (RTA) by Route 405 (Yellow Line) travelling from the Columbia Mall to the Miller Branch Public Library. The Maryland Transit Administration also provides commuter bus service via Lines 150 and 345. Dorsey station is the nearest MARC Train, located 9 miles away in Elkridge. The station is accessed off of Route 100 and is equipped with over 800 spaces.

Howard County has planned an extension of Montgomery County's Flash BRT bus system to Columbia by summer of 2026. If successful, a further extension to Long Gate in Ellicott City and other additional locations is under consideration.

Numerous paths and trails surround Ellicott City for recreational and commuting purposes. The Grist Mill Trail in Patapsco Valley State Park runs parallel to the Patapsco River in Baltimore County, connecting Ilchester Road to Gun Road in Relay. The trail is known for the Patapsco Swinging Bridge. The Trolley Line Number 9 Trail in nearby Oella also connects Ellicott City to Catonsville.

=== Roads ===
Major east–west routes in Ellicott City include:

- Maryland Route 144 (Main Street)
- U.S. Route 40 (Baltimore National Pike)
- Interstate 70 traveling east to west from Frederick to Baltimore
- Maryland Route 103 (Montgomery Road).

Other major highways in Ellicott City include:

- U.S. Route 29 (Columbia Pike) has its northern terminus at I-70, then travels southward towards Columbia and Washington, D.C.
- Maryland Route 100 terminates in the south part of Ellicott City and travels eastward towards Glen Burnie.

North-south cross routes include Bethany Lane, Centennial Lane, Chatham Road, Marriottsville Road, Ridge Road, Rogers Avenue (Maryland Route 99), and Saint Johns Lane.

=== Airports ===
Nearby airports include Baltimore-Washington International Airport, 10 miles (16 km) southeast of Ellicott City, and Glenair Airport in Glenelg, 10 miles to the west.

== Notable people ==
- Jeff Altenburg, racing driver
- Edith Clarke, pioneering electrical engineer
- Frank Cho, comics writer/artist, and creator of Liberty Meadows
- Ray Ciccarelli, American professional stock car racing driver
- Taylor Cummings, lacrosse player
- Divine, actor and drag queen
- Dijon Duenas, musician
- Andy Freed, radio announcer for the Tampa Bay Rays
- Bryce Hall, American social media personality
- Brian Harvey, distance runner, 3-time Olympic Trials qualifier
- Samuel Hinks, Mayor of Baltimore from 1854 to 1856
- Aaron Maybin, former professional football player for the New York Jets of the National Football League; went to high school in Ellicott City
- Robert G. Millar, Christian Identity leader whose evangelical group was first established in Ellicott City
- Ken Navarro, contemporary jazz guitarist and composer
- Creig Northrop, real estate agent, broker, and CEO of Northrop Realty
- Alexis Ohanian, internet entrepreneur, activist and investor
- Preston A. Pairo Jr. (1927–2010), member of the Maryland House of Delegates
- Ashley Rous (born 1998), American fashion influencer better known as Bestdressed
- Aaron Russell, professional volleyball player for the United States national team
- Snail Mail, band of Mount Hebron High School alum Lindsey Jordan
- Edward Snowden, NSA leaker
- Peter Solomon, Major League Baseball player for the Houston Astros
- The Dangerous Summer, American rock band
- Martha Ellicott Tyson (1795–1873), Quaker elder, author, and co-founder of Swarthmore College
