= Haysfield Airport =

Haysfield Airport Haysfield
- IATA: none; ICAO: none; FAA LID: MD24

Summary
- Owner: Alfred Bassler
- Operator: Alfred Bassler
- Serves: Clarksville, Maryland
- Location: Clarksville, Maryland
- Opened: 1974
- Closed: 2012
- Occupants: 27
- Elevation AMSL: 128 m (420 ft)
- Coordinates: 39°14′N 76°56′W

Map
- Location of airport in Maryland

Runways
| Direction | Length | | Surface |
| Direction | m | ft | Surface |
|---|---|---|---|
| 13/31 | 732 | 2,400 | Grass |

Haysfield Airport - MD24 was an airport located in Howard County, Maryland.

== History ==
Haysfield Airport started operations in 1974. The airport was founded by Alfred Bassler. Bassler's father owned a large strategic parcel and airfield where Howard Research Associates intended to build the development of Columbia, Maryland. Bassler exchanged land to avoid capital gains for a 504-acre Hayland farm in nearby Clarksville, Maryland where he established Haysfield Airport and a tree nursery. At its peak the airfield hosted 50 aircraft onsite. The airfield faced regular zoning battles throughout its history. There were efforts to convert the airport to public use, but the NSA and Maryland Aviation Administration opposed the plan.

After the September 11th attacks, a series of highly restrictive airspace changes now called the Washington, DC Metropolitan Area Special Flight Rules Area overlapped the field slowing business. In 2013, the airfield was closed by the Bassler family corporation in a 5 to 3 vote in order to create the 159 unit Walnut Creek housing development.

== See also ==
- Glenair Airport
