= Baltimore and Ohio Ellicott City Station Museum =

- U.S. National Register of Historic Places
- U.S. National Historic Landmark
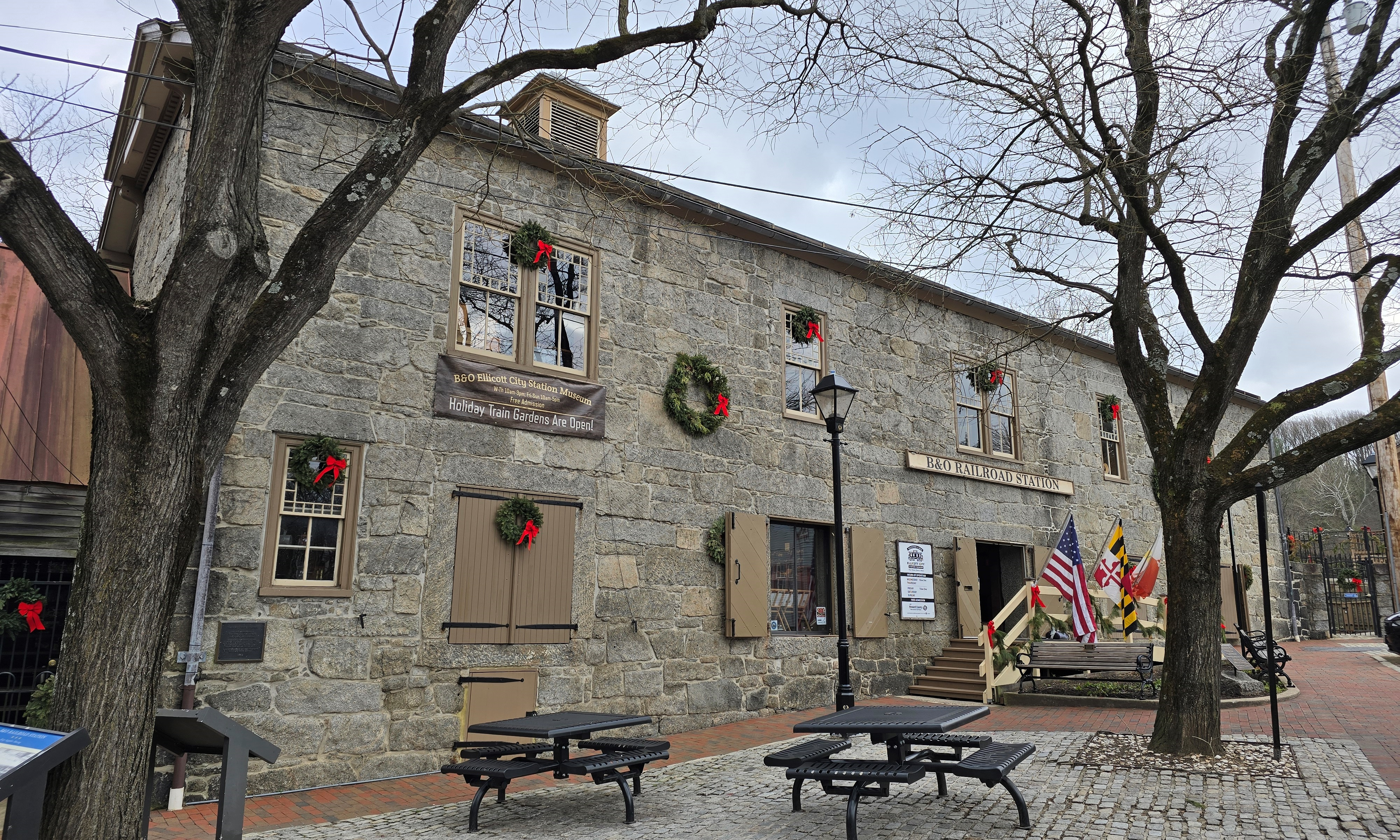
- Front of the station house in January 2025

- Location within Maryland Location within the United States
- Location: Ellicott City, Maryland
- Coordinates: 39°16′2″N 76°47′43″W
- Area: less than one acre
- Built: 1830
- NRHP reference No.: 68000025

Significant dates
- Added to NRHP: November 24, 1968
- Designated NHL: November 24, 1968

The Baltimore and Ohio Ellicott City Station Museum in Ellicott City, Maryland, is the oldest remaining passenger railway station in the United States, and one of the oldest in the world. It was built in 1830 as the terminus of the Baltimore and Ohio Railroad line from Baltimore to the town then called Ellicott's Mills, and a facility to service steam locomotives at the end of the 13-mile (21 km) run. The station, a National Historic Landmark, is now used as a museum.

== Description ==
The station was built in 1830 at the end of the Oliver Viaduct, of local stone (Ellicott City Granodiorite) provided by one of the quarries owned by the Ellicott family, which had founded the town and local flour mill in 1772. The two-story stone building is built against the viaduct. A gabled roof is topped by a wood ventilating cupola. The upper level of the station is at the level of the tracks on the viaduct.

The Oliver Viaduct was the second major stone bridge built by the railroad (after the Carrollton Viaduct). It was 123 feet (37 m) long and comprised three 20 feet (6.1 m) arches. The viaduct was damaged by Hurricane Agnes in 1972, and has since been reconstructed.

The station building was designed to allow engines to be pulled in on the upper level so that they could be worked on from below. A turntable with a diameter of 50 feet (15 m) was fitted in 1863 to permit locomotives to be turned around. The turntable was filled in after the rail line was extended, but the granite foundations remain.

The railroad built an adjacent freight house, designed by E. Francis Baldwin, in 1885. The station is now used as a museum.

== History ==
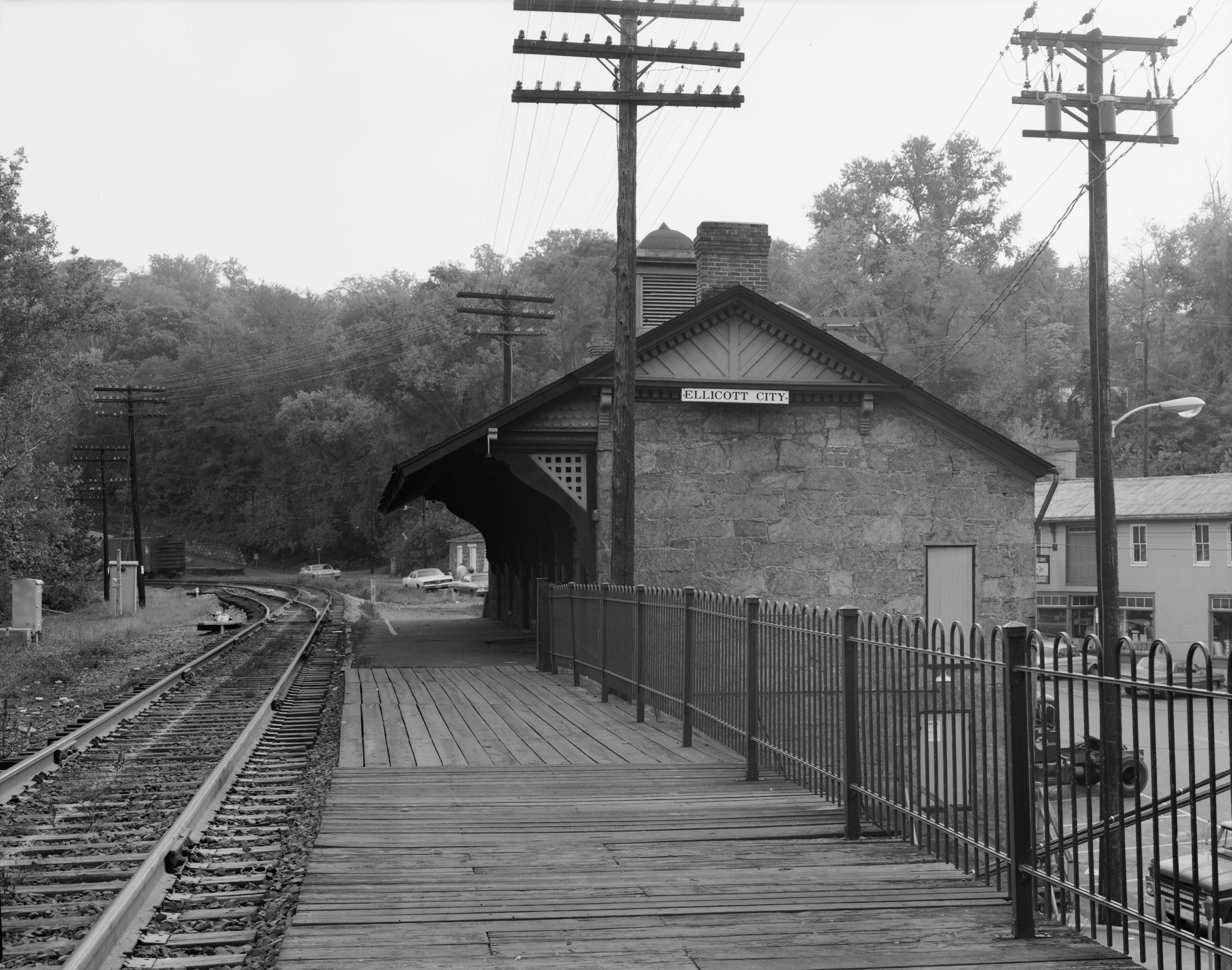
Ellicott City station in 1970

The railroad's inaugural trip from Baltimore to Ellicott's Mills has held on May 22, 1830, with horse-drawn rail cars. Regular passenger service began on May 24.

The B&O demonstrated its first locomotive, the Tom Thumb, at Ellicott's Mills in a famous race against a horse later in 1830. The railroad began using locomotives for passenger trains in 1832.

The station is the terminus of the original B&O railroad, which was intended to re-establish Baltimore as a major terminus of inland commerce after the opening of the Erie Canal. It was also meant to help the city compete against regional rival Washington, D.C., where construction was starting on the Chesapeake and Ohio Canal.

From Ellicott's Mills the tracks reached Harpers Ferry, West Virginia, in 1834, Cumberland, Maryland (the eventual terminus of the C&O Canal) by 1842, and Wheeling, West Virginia, on the Ohio River in 1852.

B&O passenger service from Baltimore to its Ellicott City station was discontinued in 1949, although freight service continued until 1972.

== Museum ==
Today, the Ellicott City Station is part of the Baltimore & Ohio Ellicott City Station Museum. The museum was operated by the B&O Railroad Museum with Howard County from 2006 to 2017. Since September 2017, the museum has been managed by Howard County's Department of Recreation & Parks. Admission is free, with fees for some special events and tours.

The B&O Ellicott City Station Museum includes:

- the original 1831 freight station with car house, later converted to a passenger station and now outfitted with period waiting rooms, a ticket/telegraph office, and office and living quarters for the freight agent
- a turntable, constructed in 1863 to turn engines so they could return to Baltimore
- the replacement freight station, designed by Ephraim Francis Baldwin and built in 1885
- a caboose dating from 1927.

An HO-gauge model train layout is housed in the 1885 freight house; the layout depicts "the original 13 miles of commercial rail track stretching from Baltimore to Ellicott Mills", and train videos are projected onto the wall behind. Other static displays include memorabilia explaining the role of the B&O Railroad and the station in the American Civil War. The car house also hosts a holiday train layout in December.

The Museum also offers living history interpretation, reenactments, guided group tours, visiting exhibits, educational programs and special events for school groups, families, and adults.

== See also ==
- List of Howard County properties in the Maryland Historical Trust
- Old Main Line Subdivision
- Trolley Line Number 9 Trail
- List of National Historic Landmarks in Maryland
- National Register of Historic Places listings in Howard County, Maryland

Preceding station	Baltimore and Ohio Railroad	Following station
Oella toward Point of Rocks	Old Main Line	Gray toward Baltimore Camden
