= Ellicott City Jail =

Historic county jail in Ellicott City, Maryland

Coordinates: 39.2689°N 76.7976°W

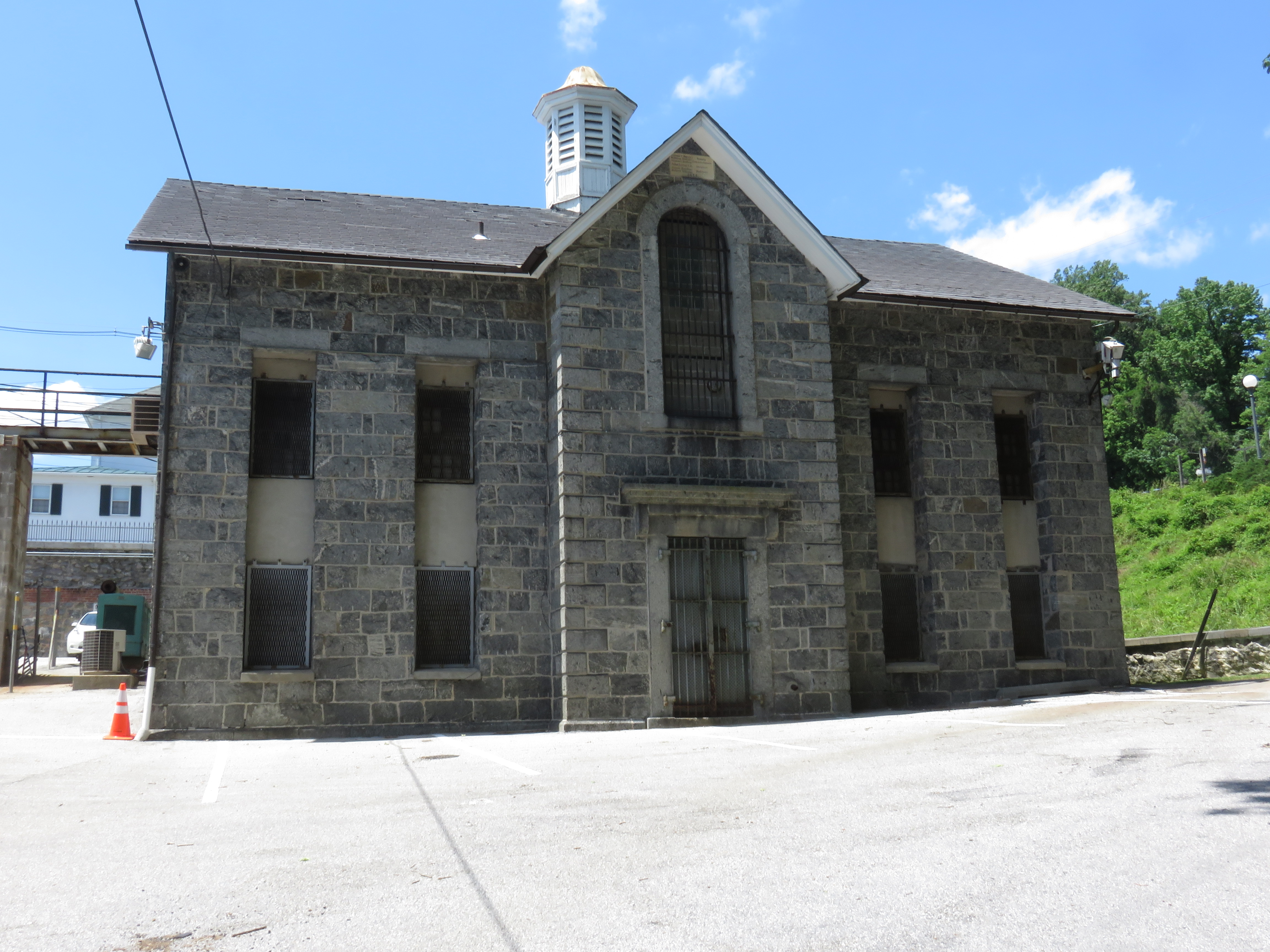
Front of the jail building in 2020

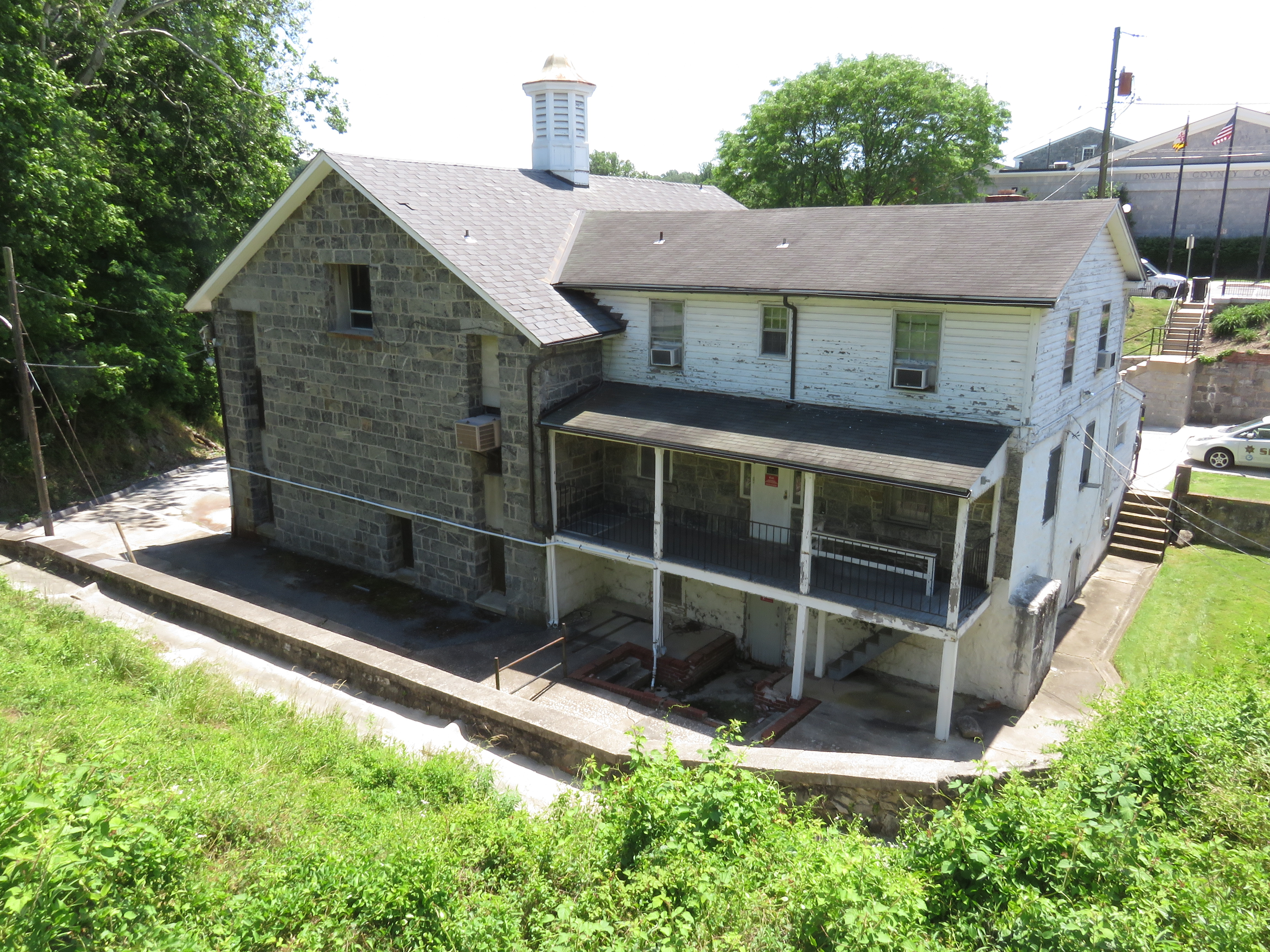
Rear of the jail building in 2020

The Ellicott City Jail was the first detention facility in Howard County, Maryland.

== History ==
Ellicott City, Maryland, first housed inmates in a stone basement of a private residence on Fells lane. The "Thousand Dollar Jail" held as many as 15 prisoners in 4 cells without proper ventilation or drainage. The overcrowded facility conditions left prisoners unsegregated. John H. Herbert Esq. petitioned for a new building in 1877. The existing jail was described as small, insecure, and defective in many ways

In 1878, Howard County opened its first permanent jail facility on Emory road in Ellicott City. The granite building was designed to house twelve inmates. The building is an example of Romanesque revival architecture. It was named "Willow Grove" or Emory Jail. The 1878 commissioners' names are inscribed in the stone (Samuel Brown, Jerome C. Berry, and Willam Rowles). Eight cells were originally constructed, including "dark cells" which held condemned prisoners awaiting morning executions.

In 1885, ten masked men broke into the jail, and lynched Nicholas Snowden, an inmate held for the murder of a young girl.

By 1889, the jail was over capacity and housed 15 inmates under warden John Lilly.

In February 1895, shop owner Daniel F Shea was murdered by Jacob Henson and Henson was sentenced to death. Fearing that Governor Brown might release Henson due to insanity, a group of residents broke into the jail and lynched Henson on Merricks Lane with a sign saying "Brown cannot rule our cort". Governor Brown condemned the citizens and ordered all condemned prisoners to the Maryland Penitentiary from then on.

Despite orders from the governor to suspend capital punishment at county facilities, prisoners were executed on site by hanging as late as 1916.

In 1921, three prisoners escaped the jail by chipping away the mortar from a granite wall block with a piece of iron, and pushed the stone out for an opening.

During World War II, the jail was used to house German POWs that were used as labor on local farms. Prisoners were paid, but only received two meals a day with proceeds going to the sheriff for his own use. The conditions later prompted a congressional inquiry.

On 18 April 1959, the building housed the Central Alarm operation in a top floor office.

In 1975, a separate division was created by County Executive Edward L. Cochran. Its first director was Gerald H. McClellan. The jail was transferred to a new facility in Jessup in 1984. Within 10 years, Howard county raised its detention facilities from 12 to 360 inmates.

The jail is unoccupied with most ironwork removed on a quarter-acre site. The slate roof was repaired with a temporary shingle roof. Asbestos removal costs are a contributing factor to the reluctance to maintain the historic structure. In 2014 and 2015, Ellicott City Jail and the Hiene House was placed on the Preserve Howard top ten most endangered list due to walkway and parking lot construction plans.

== See also ==
- Howard County Courthouse (Maryland)
- List of Howard County properties in the Maryland Historical Trust
- List of law enforcement agencies in Maryland
- Maryland Department of Public Safety and Correctional Services
