= Howard County Courthouse (Maryland) =

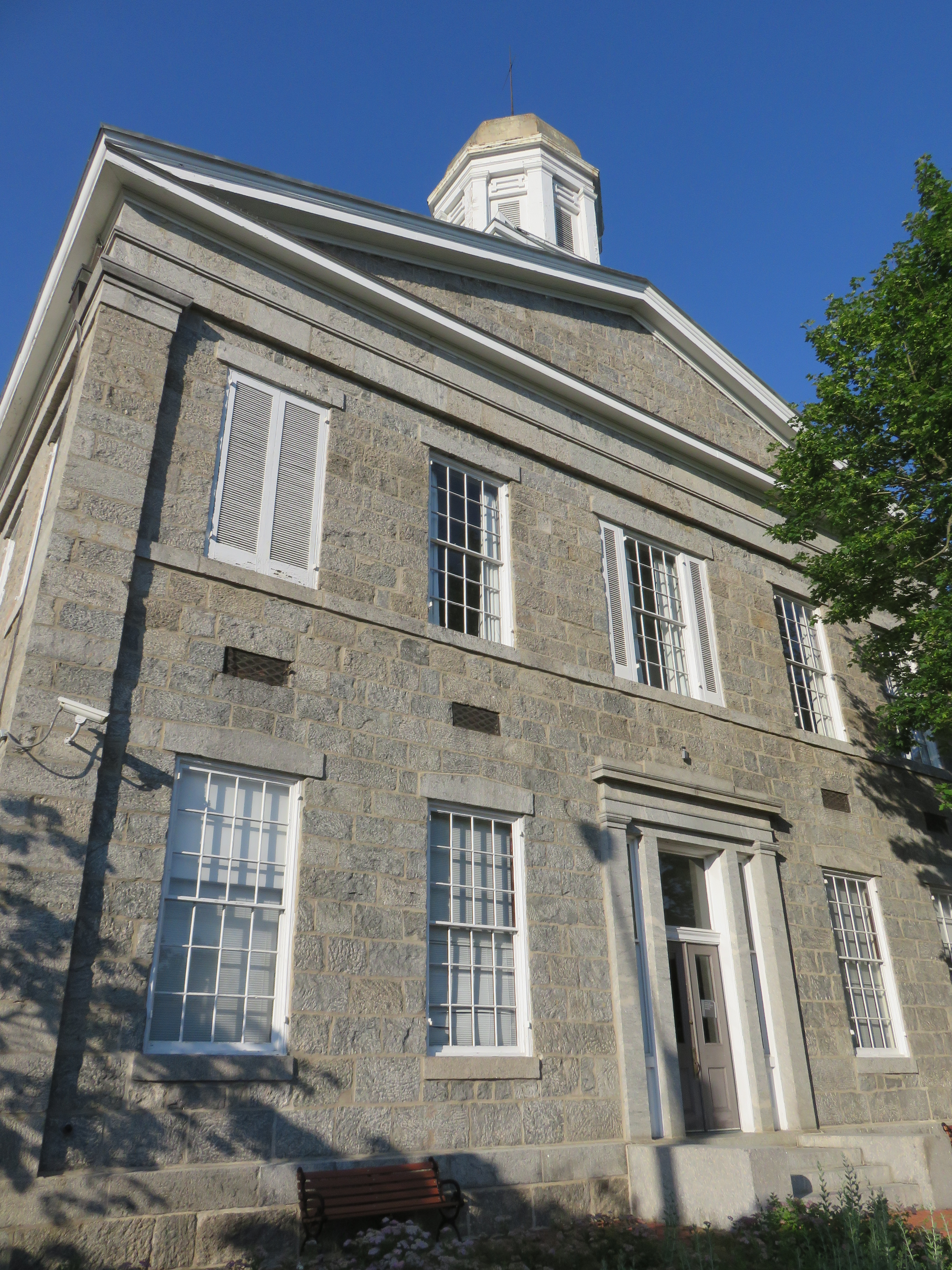
- Front of the courthouse in 2020

General information
- Architectural style: Classical Revival
- Location: Court Avenue, Ellicott City, Maryland, United States of America
- Coordinates: 39.2689°N 76.7976°W
- Construction started: 1840
- Completed: 1843
- Cost: $24,000 (1840)
- Client: Howard County, Maryland

Design and construction
- Architect: Samuel Harris
- Engineer: Charles Timanus

The Howard County Courthouse is a historic building in Ellicott City, Maryland, that was the courthouse for Howard County's Circuit Court from 1843 to 2021.

Construction of the granite building, designed by Charles Timanus, cost $24,000 and took three years (1840–1843). It is situated on a steep hill once named Capitoline Hill on property purchased from Deborah Disney. It also went by the nickname "Mt. Misery", most likely due to the pain of hauling granite blocks up the steep hill. In 1972, local historian Charles Stein claimed that the heavy granite block construction "should continue in service for centuries".

A stone house on Main Street that was used as a temporary courthouse during construction of the permanent courthouse survived until being swept away in the 2018 Ellicott City Flood after a culvert collapsed.

In July 2021, the Circuit Court moved to a new building located adjacent to the Columbia Hills neighborhood. Howard County has held public meetings and solicited concepts for reuse of the now-vacant historic courthouse and its surrounding property, but has not formally approved any definite plans.

== Howard County Circuit Courthouse and administration building ==
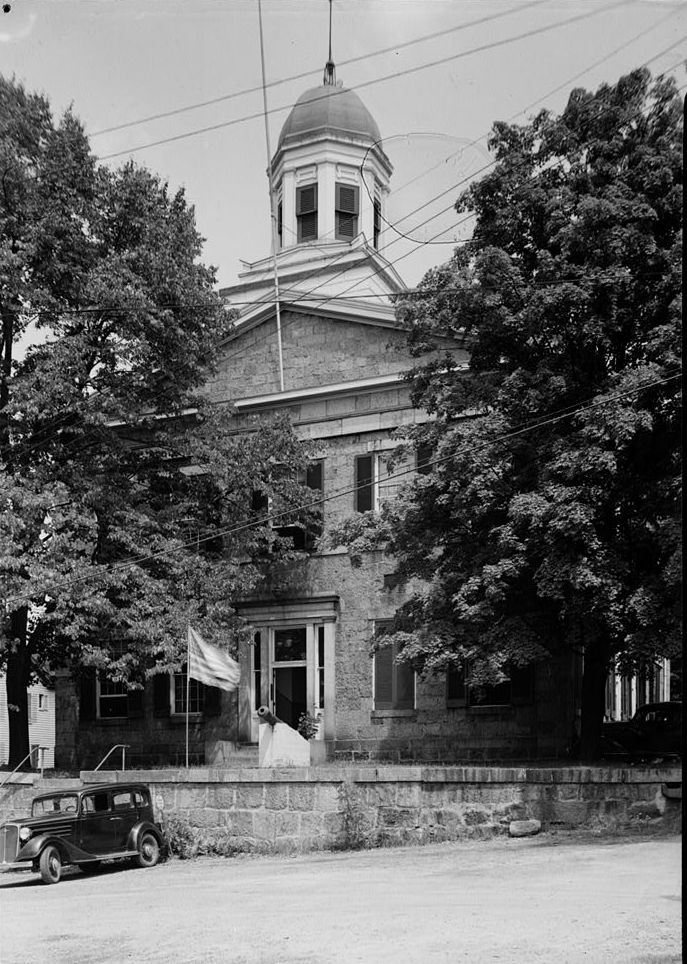
The courthouse in August 1936

By 1870, the Circuit court volume was 91 cases with 14 appeals a month. In 1938 additions were added to the courthouse. On 23 September 1948 a monument to confederate soldiers serving from Howard County was erected at the courthouse and rededicated in September 1999. In the 1960s, proponents attempted to consolidate county government on land purchased recently by The Rouse Company in its development of the city of Columbia, but did not go forward. In 1962 more additions were added to the original courthouse. In 1980 County Executive J. Hugh Nichols approved a renovation that included a 14,500 sq ft addition that connected to the Howard County Circuit Courthouse.

The courthouse houses the chambers and courtrooms for the 5 judges of the Circuit Court for Howard County, as well as the clerk's offices, jurors' assembly room, the law library and masters' offices. It has a connection to the original 1840 Howard County Courthouse, now used by the Orphan's court. A porch section is constructed from the foundation of an adjacent historic house.

The Howard County Government used the building as its headquarters of administration until the completion of the George Howard Building in 1976.

== Building consolidation ==
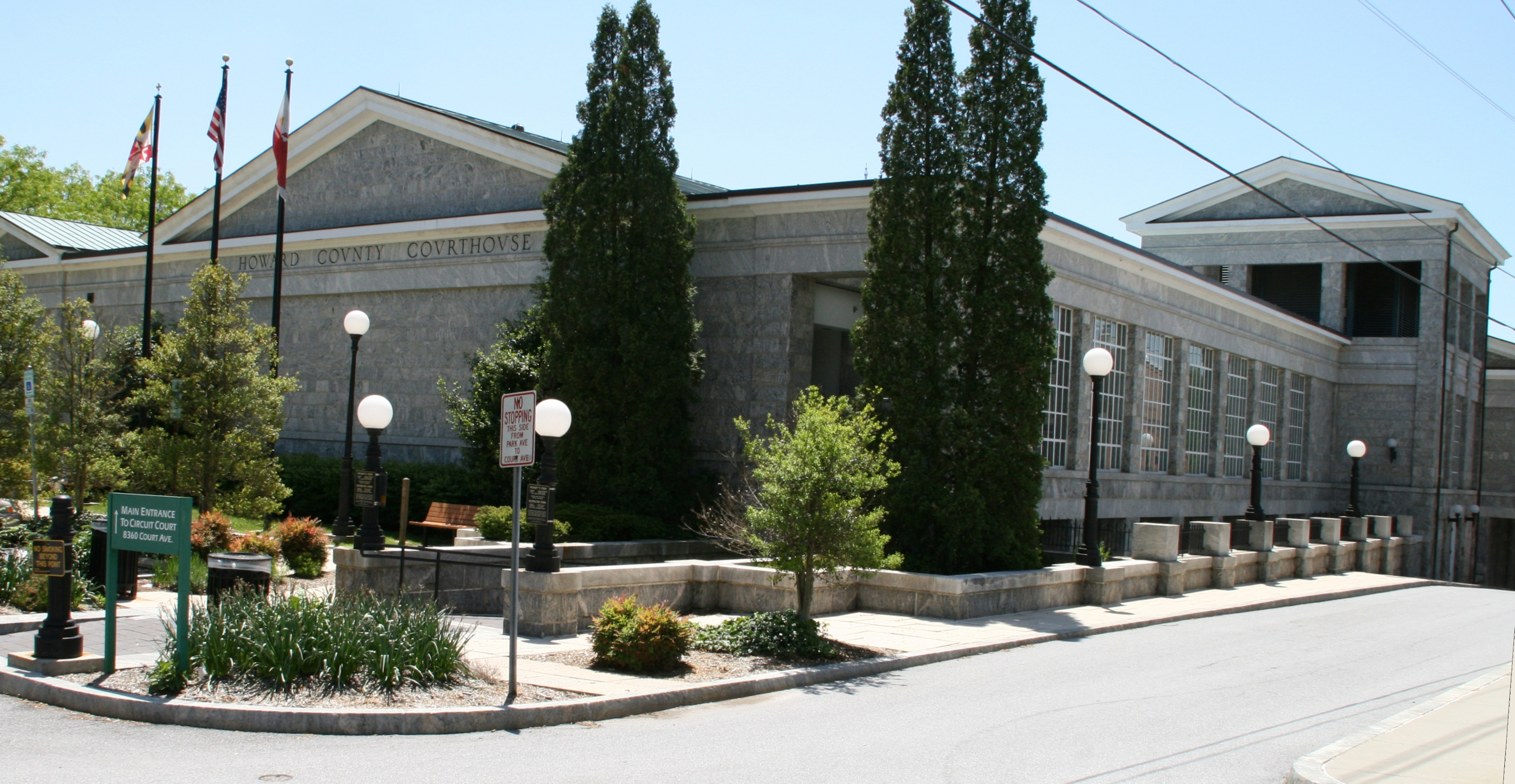
The 1980s addition incorporating the current main entrance

The building was upgraded and expanded in the $11.3 million 1982-1986 with an addition that extended the structure to six separate levels and moved the Circuit Court entrance to the rear of the property. The law library is part of the historic Hayden house which was incorporated into the addition. The law library is on two levels. The bottom level houses the general collection and 2 computers for online use and Westlaw research. Above this level is the Maryland Room, with the Maryland collection which includes all Maryland reports and the Annotated Code of Maryland. Citing respiratory issues, in 2002, Clerk of the Circuit Court Margaret D. Rappaport had the building inspected for mold contaminants.

In 2012, the circuit court was proposed to be relocated to the county owned Ascend One building while $8.58 million in renovations, but was struck down by Judge Leonore Gelfman for lack of security. The rooms reconfigured for prisoners were transferred for use by Howard County Health department patients.

The courthouse featured a small concession for food service operated by various contract holders including bailbondsman Howard F Ducan, Nixon's Farm and Kiss Catering.

In 2004, Executive James N. Robey was approached by a developer then proposed selling off the Gateway Building and Bendix Building to fund a $100 million private facility that the Government would lease back on a 25-acre county owned parcel which is now the current Park View and Ellicott Crossing housing subdivisions. In 2015 Executive Kittleman proposed a $300,000 survey to compare costs of upgrades compared to new construction of a courthouse.

== See also ==
- List of Howard County properties in the Maryland Historical Trust
- Ellicott City Jail
