= Henryton Tunnel =

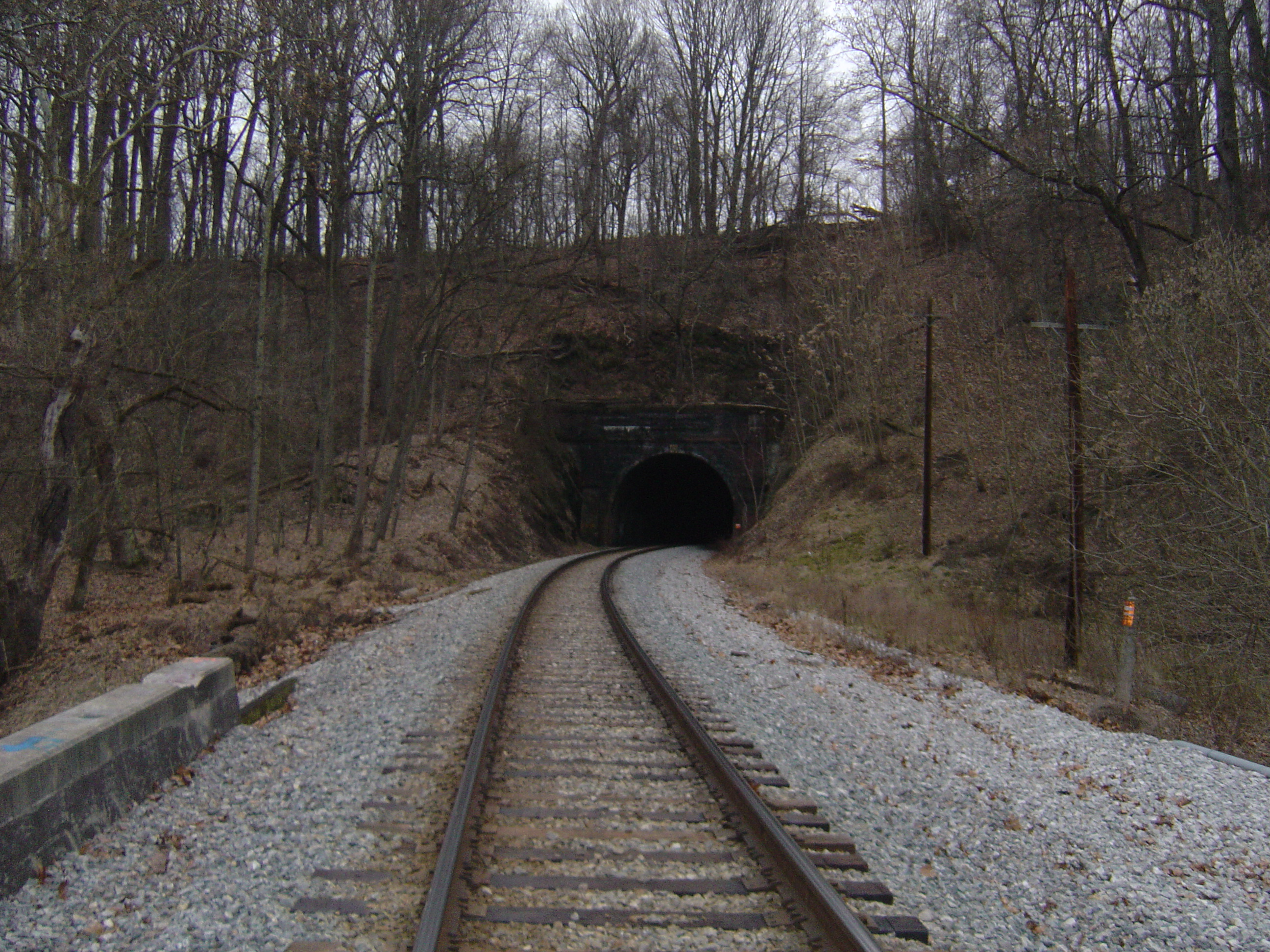
- East entrance to the tunnel. B&O widened the tunnel for double track in 1865, but converted the entire Old Main Line to single track in 1959, to utilize higher center tunnel clearances.
- Interactive map of Henryton Tunnel

Overview
- Line: Old Main Line Subdivision
- Location: Henryton, Maryland
- Coordinates: 39.3512°N 76.9128°W
- System: CSX Transportation
- Start: Near Marriottsville, MD
- End: Henryton

Operation
- Constructed: 1849-50
- Opened: 1850
- Rebuilt: 1865, 1903
- Owner: CSX
- Traffic: Train
- Character: Freight

Technical
- Length: 430.4 ft (131.2 m)
- No. of tracks: 1
- Track gauge: 1,435 mm (4 ft 8 1/2 in)
- Width: 30 ft (9.1 m)

The Henryton Tunnel, located near Henryton in southern Carroll County, Maryland, is the third-oldest tunnel in the world that remains in active railroad use. Constructed by the Baltimore and Ohio (B&O) Railroad and opened around 1850, it was the first tunnel constructed on the B&O's Old Main Line. In 1865 the tunnel was widened to accommodate double track. It was rebuilt into its current form in 1903. The tunnel has brick portals and lining. The coping and footings are concrete.

== See also ==
- Baltimore and Ohio Railroad
- Industrial Archaeology
