= Creig Northrop =

American real estate agent and broker

- Education: University of Maryland, College Park (B.A.)
- Occupations: Realtor, broker, chief executive officer

Creig Northrop is an American real estate agent and broker. He is the founder and CEO of Northop Realty, a real estate brokerage.

== Education ==
Northrop earned a Bachelor of Arts in psychology and business from University of Maryland, College Park in 1989.

== Career ==
Northrop is the founder and chief executive officer of Northrop Realty, A Long & Foster Company. In 2010, there were 40 agents on his team. He leads a team of over 90 licensed real estate professionals As of 2018. In 2015, Northrop ranked 4th in sales in Montgomery County, Maryland. In 2016, the Northrop team completed 1,772 transactions with a combined value of $765.5 million. Northrop has ranked number one in Maryland for sales volume for eleven consecutive years in 2016. It is the ranked number one in sales volume nationwide in 2010, 2011, and 2016. In 2017, Northrop opened a realty firm in West Palm Beach, Florida. In September 2017, Northrop Realty opened an office in Clarksville, Maryland.

In February 2018, Northrop Realty became a full service brokerage. It has offices in Annapolis, Clarksville, Columbia, Ellicott City, Fenwick, Frederick, Silver Spring, Sykesville, and Timonium. Northrop was named the 2018 Entrepreneur of the Year by the Howard County Chamber of Commerce. In June 2018, he was recognized as a 2018 Inman Innovator Award finalist.

In 2013, Northrop was the subject of a lawsuit alleging financial kickbacks. He denied the accusations. The suit was dismissed in January 2019 with the U.S. District Court ruling that the plaintiffs were not injured and that the statute of limitations had expired.

Northrop was honored as an "Influential Marylander" and inducted into the "Circle of Influence" in 2019 by the Daily Record.

== Personal life ==
Northrop resides in Ellicott City, Maryland. He is married to Carla Northrop. His mother, Elaine Northrop, is also a real estate agent. In 2015, he joined the board of directors of the University System of Maryland Foundation.
