= Henryton, Maryland =

Unincorporated community in Maryland, United States

- Unincorporated settlement
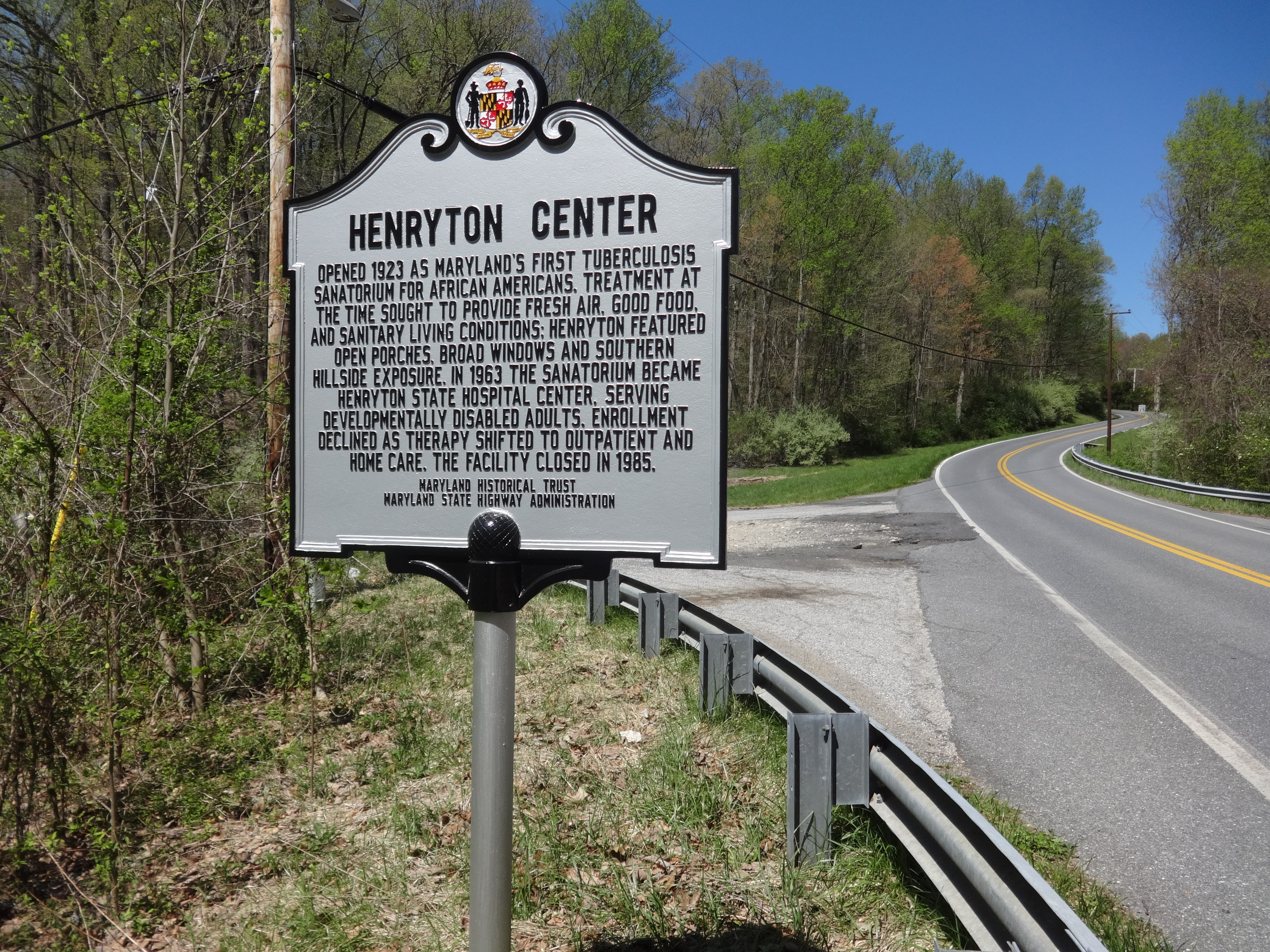

- Location within the state of Maryland Henryton (the United States)
- Coordinates: 39°21′04″N 76°54′48″W
- Country: United States
- State: Maryland
- County: Carroll
- Time zone: UTC-5 (Eastern (EST))
  - Summer (DST): UTC-4 (EDT)

Henryton was an unincorporated town in Carroll County, Maryland, United States. It was located along the Patapsco River and is now within Patapsco Valley State Park. Henryton was the site of the Henryton State Hospital, which was originally constructed as a tuberculosis sanatorium and later housed mentally disabled people.

== History ==
Henryton was a rural village of about 11 houses and a store near the B&O Railroad tracks and the Patapsco River, named for Henry DeVries, a 19th-century landowner. In addition to farming and trapping, residents sold pulpwood and worked in nearby quarries. A 1960 memoir recalls walking 4 miles along the railroad tracks each way to go to the movies in Sykesville. In 1922–23, the Henryton State Hospital was built there, with its boiler house at the Henryton Road railroad crossing. This led to the roads being paved and the village becoming less rural. A small station stood across the railroad from the boiler house; the station has been demolished, and the hospital buildings were likewise demolished in 2013. The Henryton Road bridge across the Patapsco was destroyed in 1972 by Tropical Storm Agnes and was not replaced.

== See also ==
- Henryton Tunnel
