= Trolley Line Number 9 Trail =

Historical trail in Baltimore County, Maryland

Coordinates: 39°16′14.15″N 76°46′47.15″W

Trolley Line #9 Trail
- Length: 1.25 mi (2.01 km)
- Location: Catonsville, Maryland; Ellicott City, Maryland
- Established: 1990s
- Trailheads: Edmondson Avenue; Oella Avenue
- Use: Walking, jogging, biking
- Difficulty: Easy, slight slope, ADA accessible
- Season: Year-round
- Months: Year-round
- Surface: Asphalt
- Right of way: Baltimore Transit Company Streetcar 9

The Trolley Line #9 Trail is a 1.25-mile (2.0 km) trail in western Baltimore County, Maryland. It begins at the west end of Edmondson Avenue and extends from Catonsville through Oella to Main Street, Ellicott City. The trail follows what was originally part of the Catonsville and Ellicott City Electric Railway Company trolley line that shuttled passengers between Ellicott City and Baltimore from the late 1890s to the mid-1950s.

== Catonsville & Ellicott City Electric Railway Company ==
In 1805 the Baltimore and Frederick Turnpike was constructed to provide a route from Baltimore to Boonsboro Maryland. On 11 March 1861 the Baltimore, Catonsville and Ellicott Mills Passenger Railway Company was formed to service the towns of Catonsville, Oella, and Ellicott City with horse-drawn cars on the turnpike right-of-way. The company agreed that the line would not use steam trains or carry freight. Trips between Catonsville and Baltimore took two hours. The company became insolvent competing with the Catonsville Short Line Railroad (1884), and was purchased as part of the City and Suburban Railway Corporation. In 1895, the follow-on Baltimore and Catonsville Railway Company decided to extend its lines four miles to Ellicott City and convert to 33 foot long cars using electricity. Stock was issued on 25 November 1895 for the Edmondson Avenue, Catonsville & Ellicott City Electric Railway Company. Victor G. Bloede's Evans & Co. was initially given 90 days to complete the project. The company was a subsidiary of the Eden Construction Company that built Victorian neighborhoods of Eden Terrace in Catonsville. George Yakel took over as president with Louis Yaakel as vice president and William Layfield as treasurer. Construction was difficult, requiring extensive excavation along the Patapsco River Valley with several construction deaths. Steam engine winches powered plows to break the surface. Cobblestone pavers filled the surfaces between the tracks. A double track ran from Baltimore to Catonsville, and a single line ran to Ellicott City. The parent construction company went insolvent in 1897, and the railroad was later purchased and consolidated with the United Railways and Electric Company, and later the Columbia & Maryland Railway Company. Gaither's Electric express provided freight operations for a two-mile section running through Ellicott City. In the early 1900s it faced lawsuits for carrying freight against its original operating contracts. On 7 June 1914, the 200 ft long wooden bridge between Howard County and Baltimore County burned down from a discarded cigarette.

== Trail ==
A century after its construction, in the 1990s, the abandoned right-of-way was converted as part of a rails-to-trails program. Today, the path is paved and features a section of boardwalk next to walls of rock that were hand-cut by the original builders.
