= Glenair Airport =

Glenair Airport Glenair
- IATA: none; ICAO: none; FAA LID: MD46

Summary
- Owner: Glenair Association
- Operator: Diana Atwel
- Serves: Glenelg, Maryland
- Location: Glenelg, Maryland
- Built: 1974
- Occupants: 2
- Elevation AMSL: 590 ft / 180 m
- Coordinates: 39.26939°N 77.00591°W

Map
- Location of airport in Maryland

Runways
Direction	Length		Surface
Direction	ft	m	Surface
10-28	2,200	671	Grass

Glenair Airport - MD46 is an airport located in Howard County, Maryland, United States.

== History ==
Glenair Airport is a private airport opened by eight adjacent property owners in March 1974. After the airstrip had finished, a Maryland Circuit Court opinion in an unrelated case ruled that county zoning did not allow for private airstrips. Ignoring the court ruling, the residents operated the airfield without a permit anyway, until a neighbor made a complaint about the noise and expressed safety concerns. In 1983, 700 area residents protested the proposed reopening of the airfield, citing noise and safety issues, but the operating permit was approved. However, in 1986, the Maryland Court of Special Appeals overturned the approval of the operating permit, stating that the permit request was only signed by seven of the eight property owners, but the next year ordered the remaining resident to sign the permit request.

The airfield operators countered the safety concerns by citing the low statistical probability of aircraft falling from the sky relative to other risks. Residents also attempted to revoke the zoning of the airport due to its proximity to a high school, but that attempt was rejected by the Howard County Board of Appeals. The dispute escalated to the Maryland Court of Appeals on three separate occasions, with the final ruling in 1993 allowing the airport to remain open. In 2004, the owners of the airpark submitted a request to the county council to increase the maximum allowable aircraft from three to twelve.
