= J. Frank Morrison =

American politician (1841–1916)

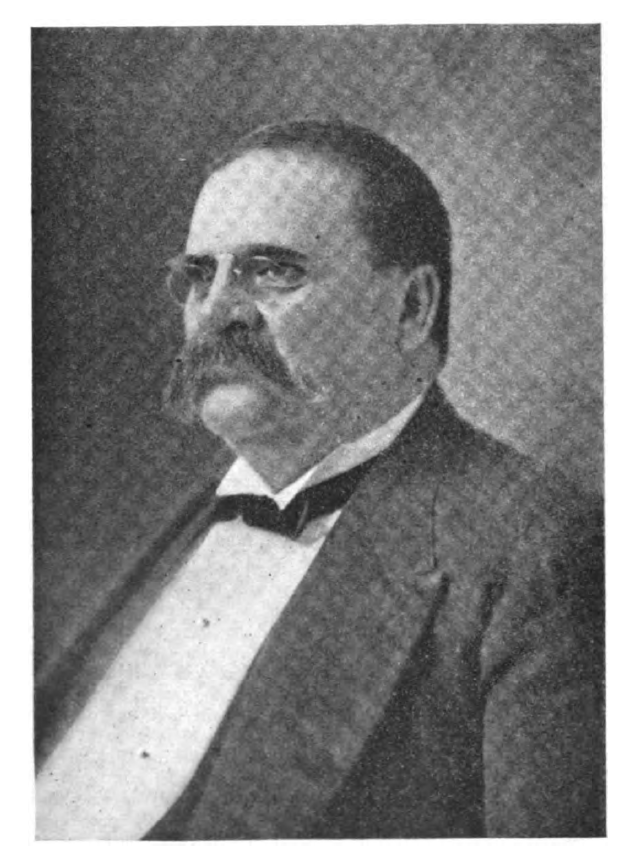

James Frank Morrison (April 18, 1841 - July 3, 1916) was an American electric company pioneer and conservative political boss during Baltimore's post-Civil War era. He managed the company that first electrified Baltimore city streets, and he formed or managed a number of companies that would eventually merge into Baltimore Gas & Electric. In 1879, he supervised the construction of the world's first commercial long distance telephone service. Morrison reached a national level when he was elected as the first president of the National Electric Light Association (NELA). He was also involved in politics, during a period in the 1870s and 80s, he was one of the three most powerful political bosses for the "Democratic Conservatives" in Baltimore.

== Biography ==
=== Early life and career ===
James Frank Morrison was born in Saint John, New Brunswick, on April 18, 1841, but his family moved between Canada and the United States several times before he settled permanently in the U.S. at the age of fifteen. After a brief time in a Boston business house, he came to Baltimore in 1862 to work in the telegraph department of the Baltimore & Ohio Railroad. For several years, he led the traveling life of a telegrapher, working for both the B&O and the Western Union Company in various cities. This career gave him invaluable technical and business experience within two of the nation's largest and most modern enterprises, providing him with an understanding of networked technologies that he would later apply to the electrical industry. In the spring of 1872, Morrison transferred to the Western Union office in Baltimore as the night chief operator and began to establish roots in the city. He married Irene C. Sifford of Frederick, Maryland that fall and became active in the Democratic Conservative party.

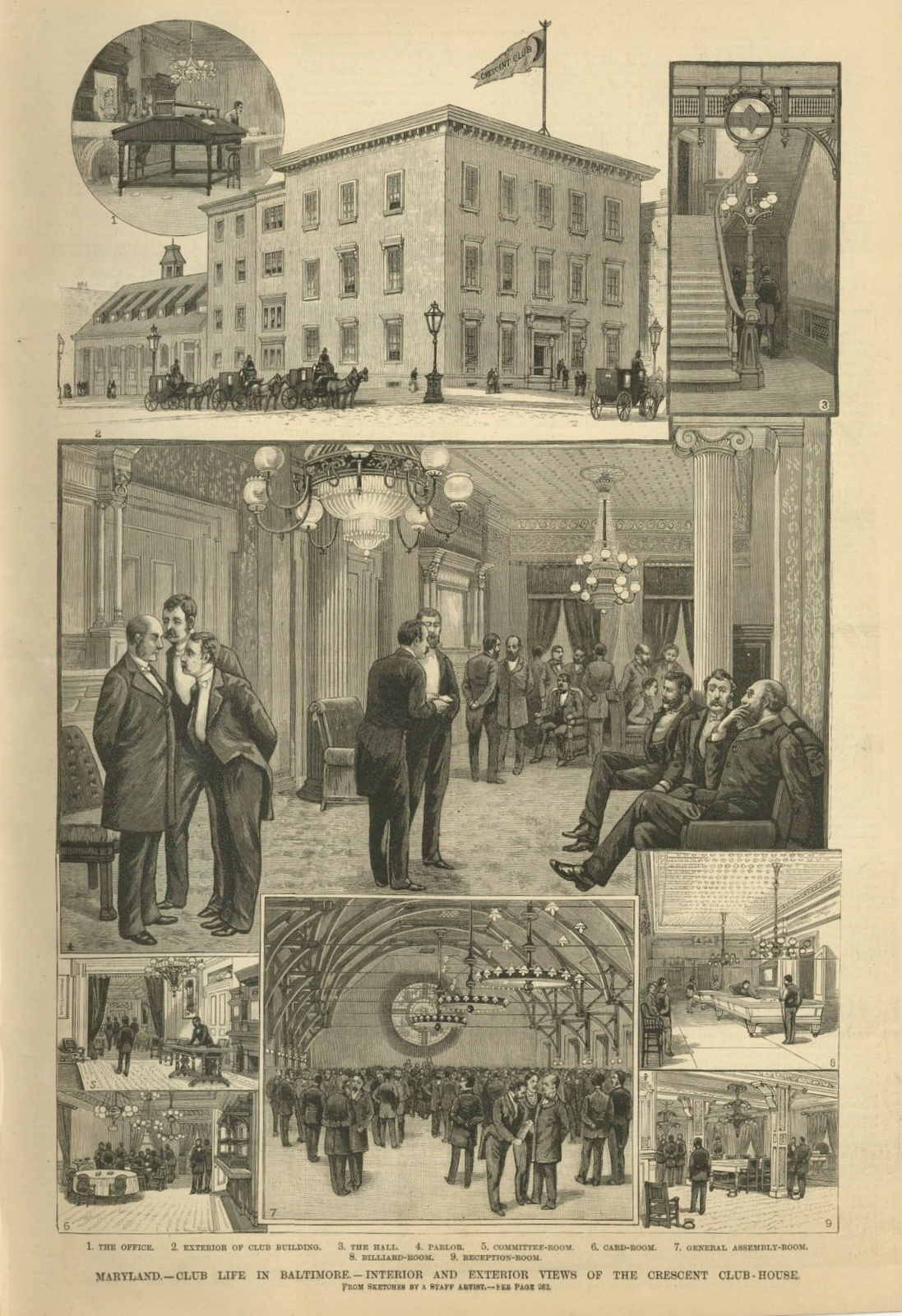
Interior and Exterior Views of the Crescent Club-House (1886). Morrison spent a lot of time here in retirement surrounded by expensive artwork, good food, drink, and cigars.

=== Political career 1874-1887 ===
His political career began in earnest with the formation of the Crescent Club in March 1874, an upscale respectable place for Democratic Conservatives to gather, debate, gamble, and drink. Morrison became the club's first president, an office he held for nearly seventeen years, transforming it into the home of Democratic Conservatives in the Fourteenth Ward and a significant base of political power. His growing influence was recognized when, in early 1874, he was appointed as the voting registrar for his ward, a position reserved for loyal party men who controlled the list of people from the ward allowed to vote.

In the fall of 1875, Morrison was the victim of a saloon stabbing that nearly killed him. After a struggle with a rival politician, Thomas Bond, Morrison was severely cut and forced to resign his position as voting registrar. He recovered, and in 1876 was appointed superintendent of the city's fire and police alarm system. In 1880, he was chosen as Warden of the City Jail, a "plum position" that offered a high salary and large patronage opportunities, meaning control over government jobs to reward political supporters, a source of his power.

The "New Judges" fight of 1882 was the "epoch-making political battle" that defined Morrison's career trajectory. In this election, Morrison and his allies broke with the regular party organization, successfully defeating the incumbent judges backed by the machine. This led directly to an act of political retaliation. Morrison was charged with corruption stemming from his time as a fire commissioner, that he intentionally overestimated the need for equipment and paid inflated prices to business partners, including a firm he co-owned. A jury eventually acquitted him, but the year-long scandal cemented his falling out with the Democratic machine and recast him as an anti-organization "reformer". He lost his fire commission.

Prior to 1884, the three most powerful Democratic Conservative bosses in the city were Morrison himself; Robert J. "Doc" Slater, the proprietor of one of the country's grandest gambling houses and who controlled parts of East Baltimore; and Isaac Freeman Rasin, a full-time professional politician who controlled a large network of his own. Rasin was the most powerful of the three, and the bosses ruled the party in alliance. Then in 1884, Morrison and Slater joined forces to challenge Rasin's Democratic Conservative candidate for the mayoral election (Brown vs. Hodges). "It was the fiercest municipal election ever fought in Baltimore", wrote Frank Kent. The rivalry was embodied by their respective headquarters: Morrison's modern electrified Crescent Club (est. 1874), Slater's opulent gambling club (est. 1862), and Rasin's Calumet Club, all served as field headquarters in their ongoing battle for political supremacy. Rasin's candidate Hodges won the seat, and after he won the election, Rasin stacked city hall with loyalists. Morrison and Slater's influence as political bosses in Baltimore waned thereafter. Morrison resigned as warden of the city jail in 1887.

=== Electric companies ===
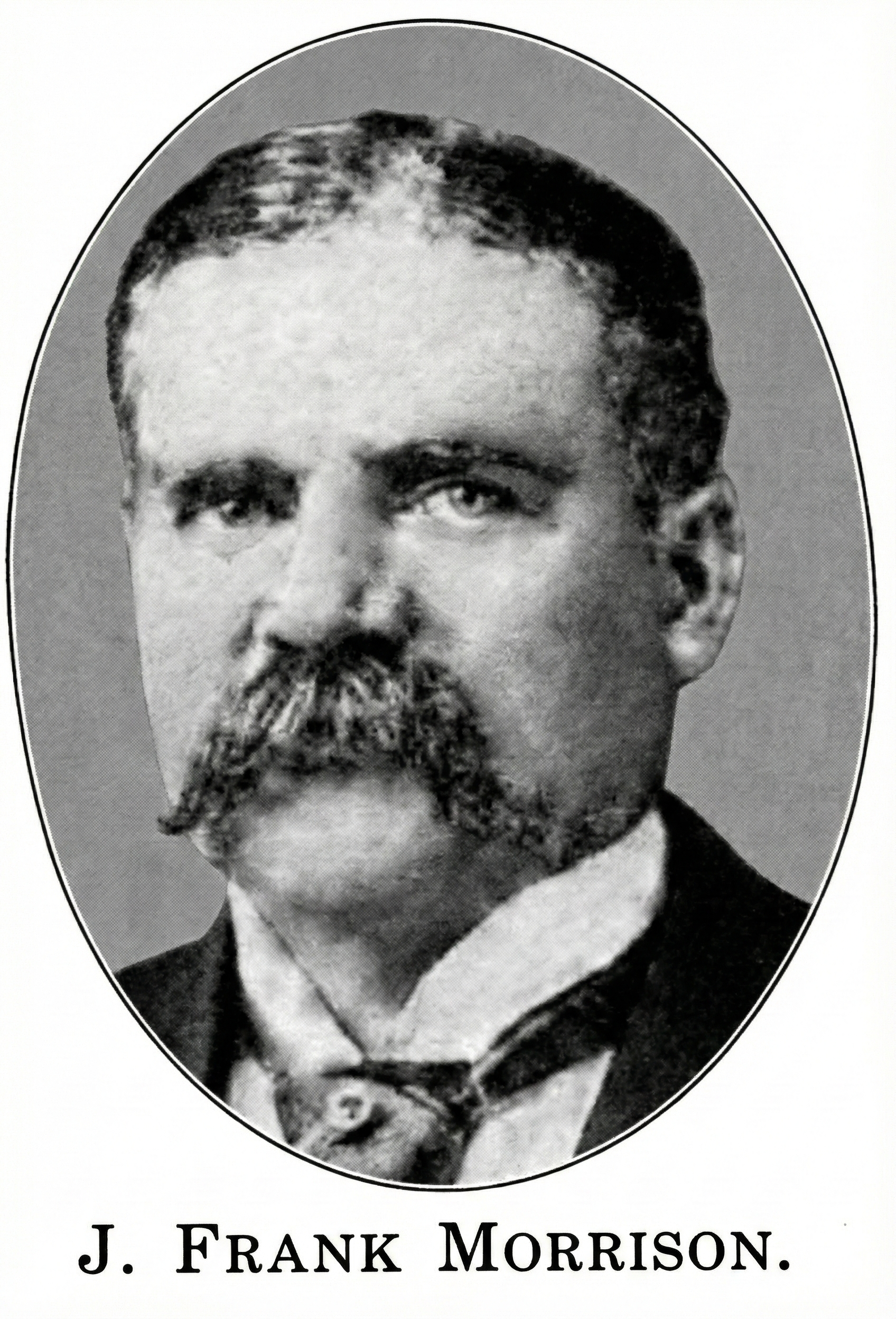
ca. 1885

While actively engaged in his political career, Morrison simultaneously pursued the business of electricity. Following a major flood in 1877, the president of the Chesapeake and Ohio Canal, Arthur Pue Gorman, hired Morrison to build a communications line. The initial plan was for a telegraph, but due to rapid advances in technology, the project was changed to a telephone system, which promised lower operating costs. Morrison's construction gangs worked through the summer of 1879, completing a line that stretched over 180 miles from Georgetown to Cumberland, Maryland. The system used forty-eight Edison Universal Telephones stationed at intervals along the route, and was considered a pioneering achievement, the world's first long-distance telephone service. As superintendent of the Baltimore Police and Fire Alarm Telegraph, Morrison traveled to Boston, New York, and Philadelphia to study their alarm systems. Between 1876 and 1877, he supervised the complete reconstruction of Baltimore's network, a project that involved installing 150 alarm boxes connected by 170 miles of wire on over two thousand poles. When he was appointed Warden of the City Jail in 1880, Morrison quickly transformed the institution. He improved sanitation, isolated different departments, and changed the rules to enforce discipline. He also drew up plans to apply electricity to the gas lighting so that all the lights could be turned on and off instantly.

The incorporators of the Brush Electric Light Company of Baltimore, formed in 1881, tapped Morrison to manage their operations. His political influence was considered vital for the fledgling company, whose success depended largely on winning a contract to light the public streets of Baltimore. In 1882, the city council passed a bill giving the Brush Company a five-year contract, providing it a huge advantage over its competitors and a steady stream of revenue. This move was criticized by opponents as a private company using political connections to plunder the public purse. Morrison's influence grew to a national level when he was elected the first president of the National Electric Light Association (NELA) at its founding convention in 1885, a position he held for the first three years of its existence. This role placed him at the center of the developing nationwide electric industry.

After his relationship with the Brush Company ended around 1890, Morrison continued to found and operate other electrical ventures, including the Maryland Electric Company and the Northern Electric Company. He played a foundational role in what would become Baltimore Gas & Electric (BG&E). In 1899, a local syndicate purchased his Northern Electric Company, along with the Brush and Edison companies, and merged them into a single entity: the United Electric and Power Company (UEPC). This consolidated company later merged with the Consolidated Gas Company to create the direct precursor to BG&E. Following this consolidation, Morrison's role in the industry he helped build was greatly diminished.

=== Death ===
After a career in both politics and the electrical industry, Morrison retired into an extended seclusion due to ill health from tongue cancer, and he died on July 3, 1916, at the age of 75. He had a son who died at 21 months (date unknown). He is buried at Frederick's Mount Olivet Cemetery with his wife, who died the previous October. He was survived by a brother and two sisters in Canada.
