= Harry and Fulton Gordon Property =

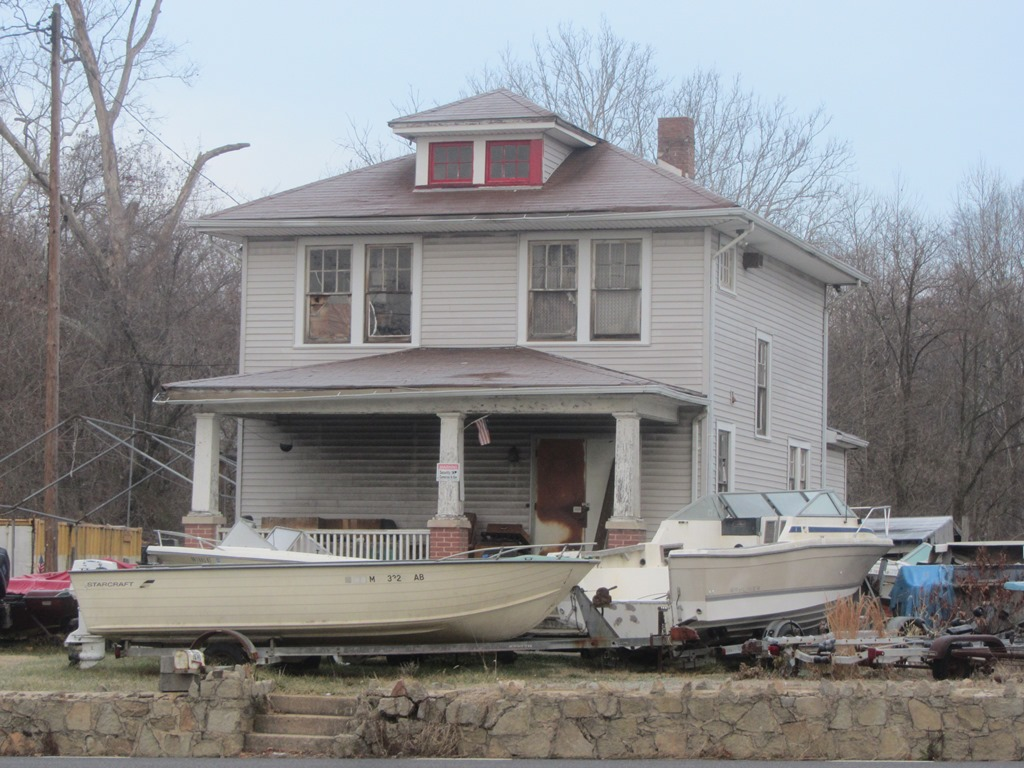
- Original Route One stone wall in 2015

- Location within Maryland
- 39°06′24.0″N 76°50′26.7″W
- Nearest city: North Laurel, Maryland

History
- Built: 1905

Site notes
- Architectural style: American Foursquare

The Gordon Property is a site of one of the first residential subdivisions along the historic Route 1 corridor in North Laurel, Maryland.

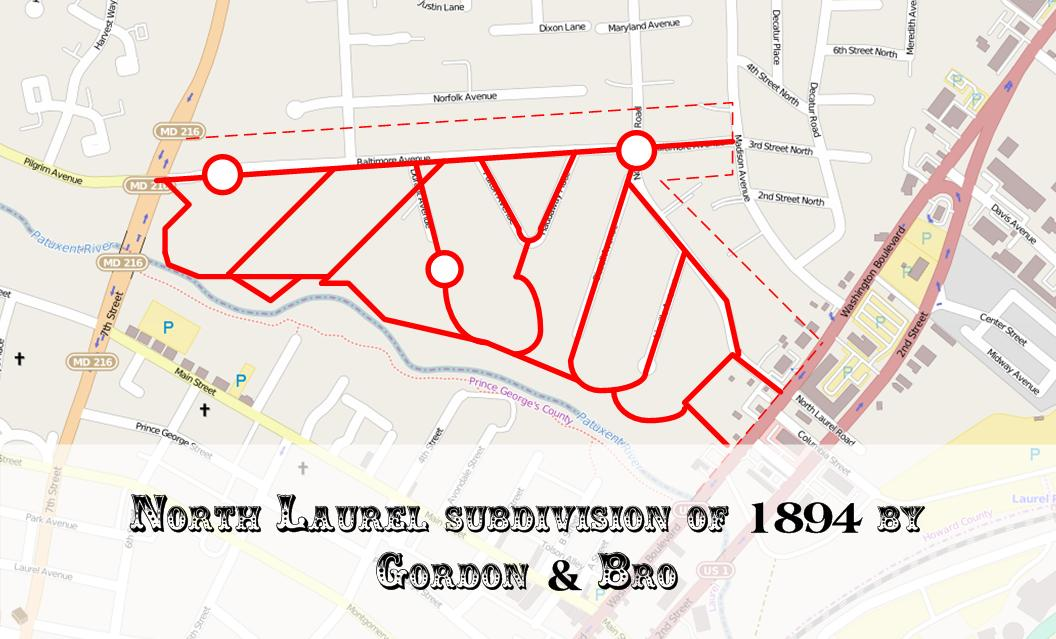
"North Laurel" streets over modern North Laurel map

Prior to the industrial settlements of mills along the Patuxent River. The Gordon property was patented as part of Alexander and Absolute Warfield's estate "Warfield's Range", which was resurveyed as "Sappington's Sweep" as part of a 1731 inheritance to Thomas Sappington from his grandfather Thomas Rutland. What later became Route 1 was built along the property in 1749 and was operated as a turnpike from 1820 to 1865. In 1870, John and Elizabeth Water sold their interest in Sappington's Sweep to William and Mary Cissel in 1890. The property was sold the same year for $35,000 to brothers Harry D. and Fulton R. Gordon from Bailey's Crossroads, Virginia, who subdivided a tract on the Howard County side of the Patuxent River to form "North Laurel". The business office for the development was operated out of an office at 918 F Street NW in Washington, D.C. as Gordon & Bro, marketing real estate in the "suburbs" between Baltimore and Washington. By 1894, the Gordon brothers sold a portion of "North Laurel" for $64,000 to the Key Brothers & Company to finance the purchase of the Lincoln Hotel in Washington D.C. Fulton Gordon divorced shortly afterward and declared himself broke. The brothers built an American Foursquare on "Lot 10" prior to 1905 sitting prominently along route one with a large stone retaining wall. The house remained in their name until the late 1930s while the brothers developed land that would become Chevy Chase, Maryland. Land subdivision would be a booming business a century later, the "smart growth" features of tightly clustered lots featuring access to light rail services, walkable community and the county's first traffic circles remained largely undeveloped until the 1960s with some lots vacant today. Fulton R. Gordon was quoted as saying if the land had been given to him "I'd have been robbed".

== Present ==
The Gordon house property is currently operated as McMillan Marine.

== See also ==
North Laurel, Maryland
