= Peter Gorman =

American businessman

- Born: 1808; Baltimore, Maryland
- Died: June 6, 1862 (aged 53–54); Baltimore, Maryland
- Resting place: Loudon Park Cemetery, Baltimore, Maryland
- Occupation: Businessman
- Spouse: Elizabeth A. Browne
- Children: 5 (including Arthur Pue Gorman and William Henry Gorman)
- Parents: John Gorman (father); Miss McDonald (mother)

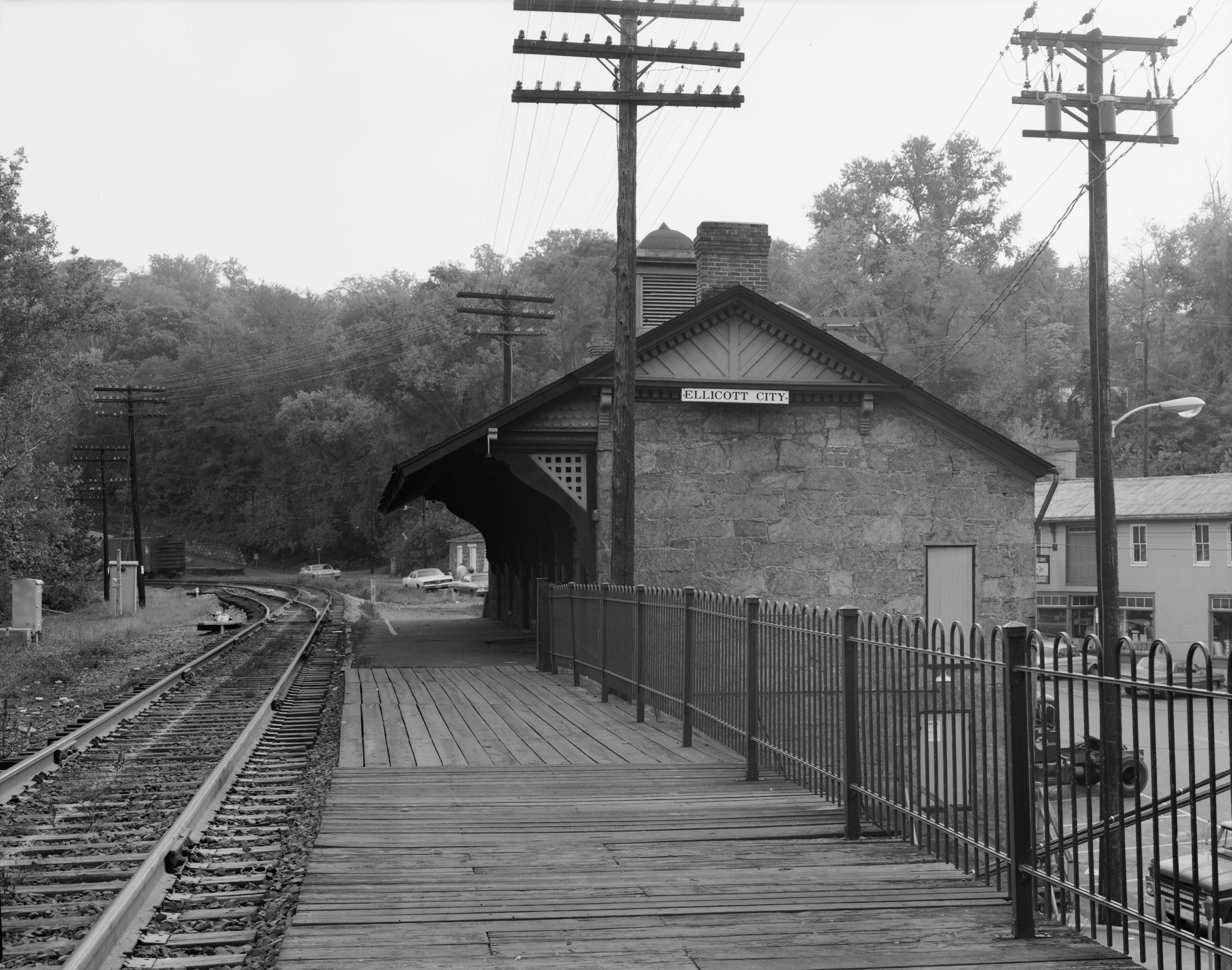
Ellicott City Station of the B&O

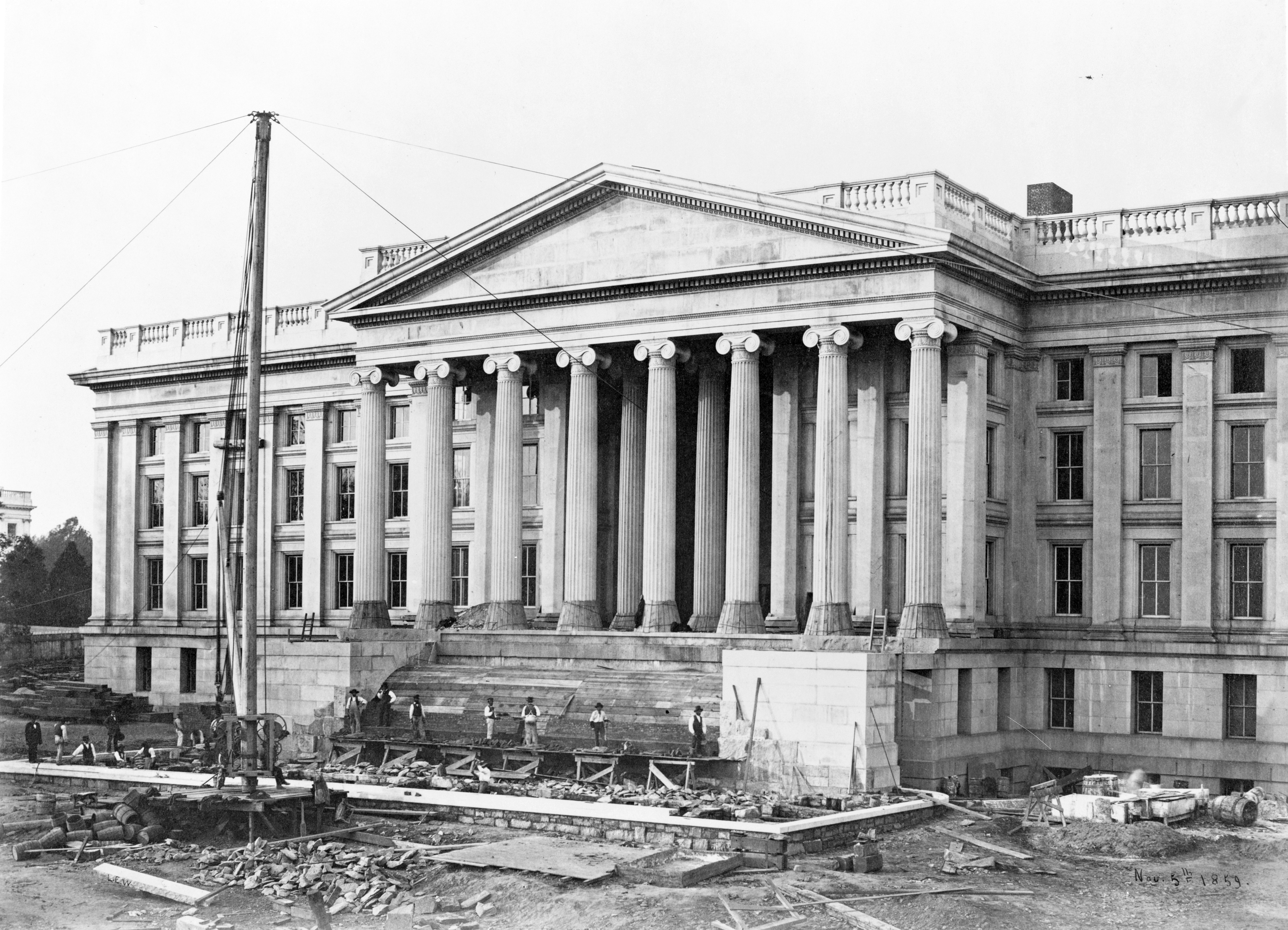
Image of the Treasury Building construction.

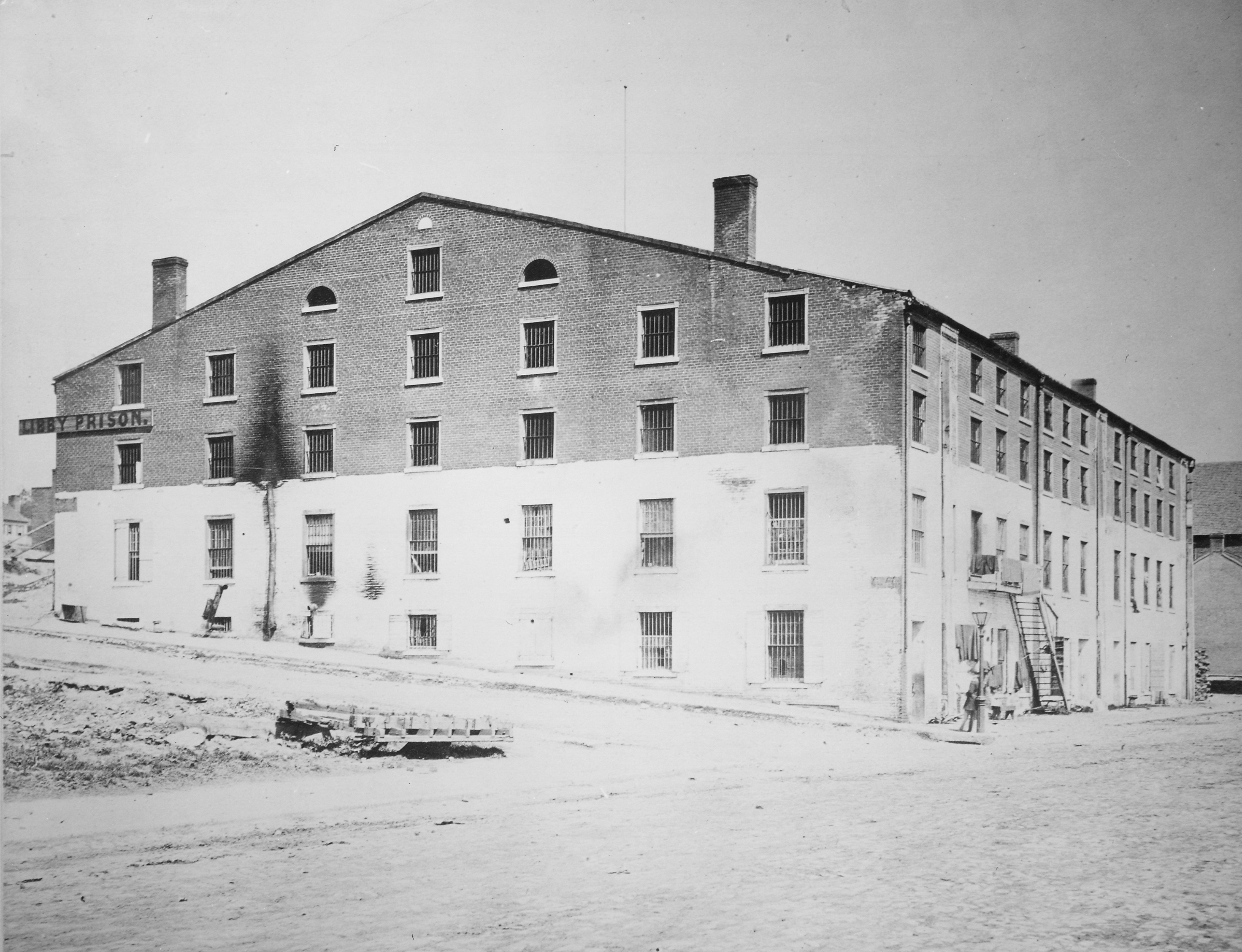
Libby Prison, 1865, from the collection of the National Archives and Records Administration.

Peter Gorman (1808 – June 6, 1862) was one of the first contractors of the Baltimore and Ohio Railroad. His son Arthur Pue Gorman would go on to become a Senator and pioneer in baseball. His other son William Henry Gorman would become a prominent businessman.

Gorman's parent's John Gorman and Miss McDonald (first name unknown), came from Northern Ireland in 1794 to Harrisburg, Pennsylvania, and later Baltimore, Maryland working in the cattle business. Gorman married Elizabeth Browne, daughter of John Riggs Browne who owned the farmstead called Good Fellowship dating back to the original land grant by Cecilius Calvert, 2nd Baron Baltimore. In the 1840s Gorman built a two-story granite house where his first son Arthur was born. After completing his railroad contract, he purchased the 500-acre estate Fairview in North Laurel from Dr. Charles Griffith Worthington. The property was part of Warfield's Range, containing a log cabin built around 1696 that survived until an arson fire in 2001 when relocated to accommodate the Warfield's Range development. He built a house and library at the site shortly before his death. The house burned down in 1890 and a new Queen Anne structure was built in its place. A school house (No.4) was also situated on the site in 1860. Fairview stayed in the family until the 1970s where a Healy painted portrait of young Peter Gorman hung. He had five children, naming his first son Arthur Pue after his doctor and tutor Dr. Arthur Pue. The 1850 census recorded Gorman as owning at least one slave.

Gorman was a contractor for the portion of the Baltimore and Ohio Railroad between Ellicott Mills and Woodstock, Maryland. In 1845, Peter Gorman was responsible for the first macadamized (paved) road in Laurel, Avondale Street next to the new Avondale Mill.

In 1850, William T. Hamilton and General Edward Hammond were called upon to give 11-year old Arthur Pue a page position in Washington D.C. Gorman and his younger son William Henry Gorman (1843–1915) were said the proprietors of several quarries in Laurel that supplied granite for the U.S. Treasury Building and the United States Capitol, and bridges for the Baltimore and Ohio Railroad although no primary sources were found to support this.

Gorman was captured on a business trip south in 1860 and sent to Libby Prison. He died in Baltimore on June 6, 1862.
