= Isaac Freeman Rasin =

American politician (1833–1907)

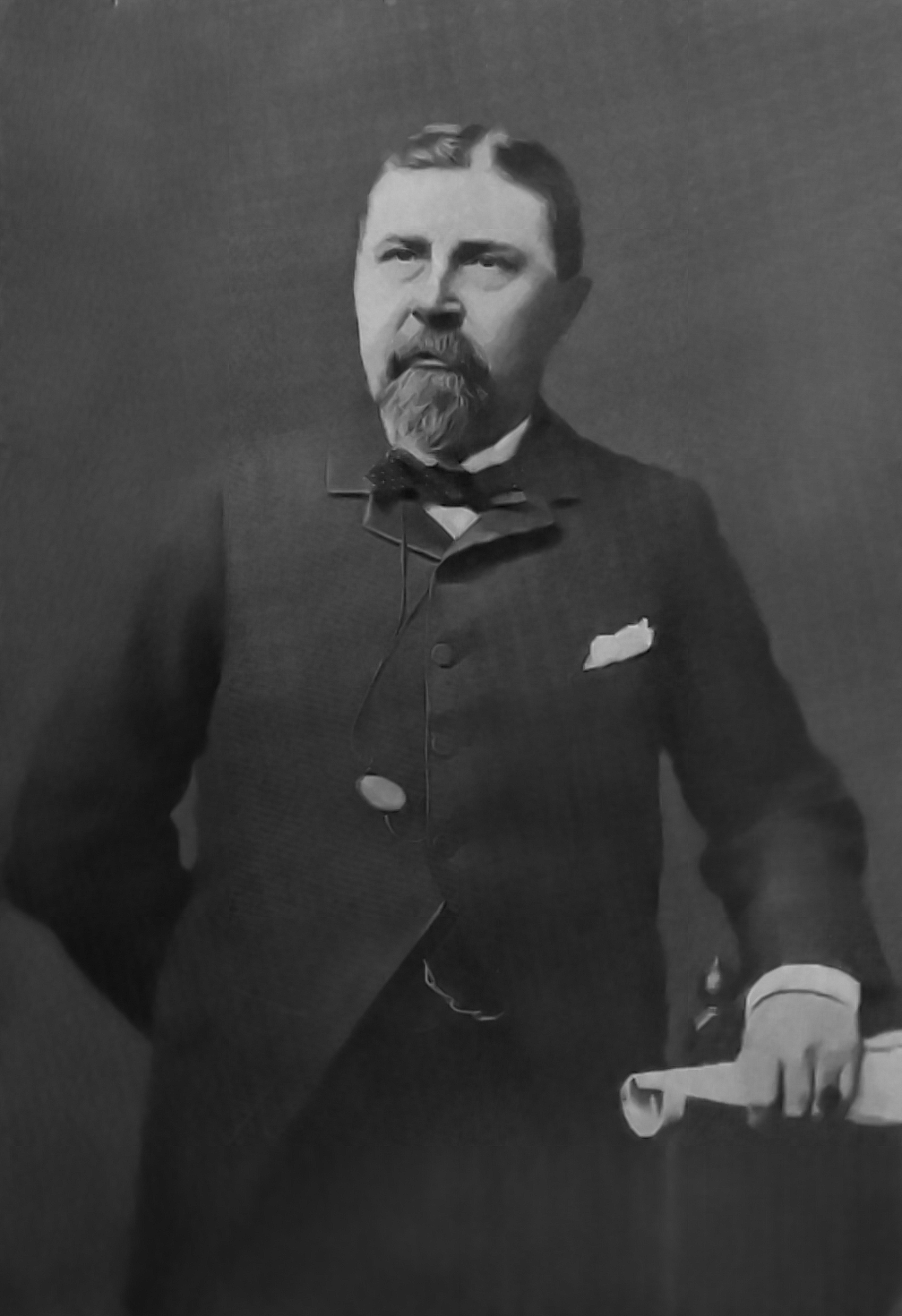

Personal details
- Born: March 11, 1833 Kent County, Maryland, U.S.
- Died: March 9, 1907 (aged 73) Baltimore, Maryland, U.S.
- Resting place: Green Mount Cemetery; Baltimore, Maryland, U.S.
- Party: Know Nothing (before 1864); Democratic (1864–1907)
- Spouse: Julia Ann Claypoole (m. 1862; died 1899)
- Children: 6
- Relatives: William Rasin (great-grandfather)
- Education: Washington College
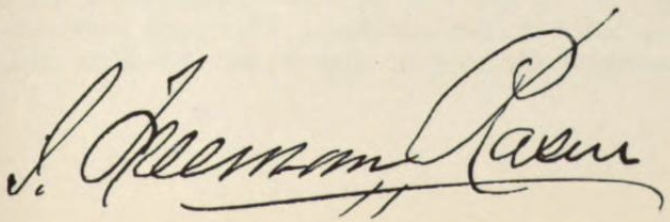
- Signature

Isaac Freeman Rasin (March 11, 1833 – March 9, 1907) was an American political boss as the Democratic Leader of Baltimore from 1870 to 1907. He helped run the Gorman–Rasin organization with Arthur Pue Gorman, which influenced Baltimore politics in the 1870s and 1880s.

== Early life ==
Isaac Freeman Rasin was born on March 11, 1833, at Castle Carey in Kent County, Maryland, to Mary Rebecca (née Ringgold) and Robert Wilson Rasin. He studied at Washington College. His great-grandfather William Rasin, an assemblyman, came to America, married Sarah Freeman and settled in Kent County in the 1730s. He was of French ancestry on his father's side. The Rasin family owned the "Old Field Point" estate (368 acres of farmland and 300 acres of riparian forest) on the Sassafras River.

== Career ==
Rasin worked as a clerk in his father's dry goods store in Baltimore. He worked in a similar role until 1867. Rasin got involved in ward-level politics in East Baltimore, first joining the Know Nothing party and serving as secretary in the Ashland Club, a Know Nothing organization of East Baltimore. He then joined the Democratic party. In 1864, he was elected by his friends to the Democrats' city executive committee. Rasin was known as the "Old Man" of Baltimore Politics, and sometimes went by Freeman Rasin or "Free" Rasin.

Rasin was elected as clerk of the Baltimore City Court of Common Pleas in 1867. He was re-elected in 1873 and 1879. He served in this role from 1867 to 1885. Rasin served as a delegate to the 1884 Democratic National Convention and also served as a member of the Democratic state executive committee. In 1886, President Grover Cleveland appointed Rasin as naval officer of the Port of Baltimore. He held this role throughout Cleveland's administration.

In 1870, Rasin met Arthur Pue Gorman and formed what would be known as the Gorman–Rasin organization, a political machine in Baltimore in the 1870s and 1880s. In 1878, the "Old Guard" was formed, seven men that would leave their mark on Maryland politics and be associated with the political machine. These men included: Gorman, Rasin, Jesse K. Hines, Levin Woolford, Michael Bannon, George Colton and John W. Davis. Other members of the political organization included Robert J. "Doc" Slater, J. Frank Morrison, John J. Mahon, Thomas G. Hayes, Robert M. McLane, Frederick Raine, William Pinkney Whyte, James B. Groome and Edwin Warfield. Both Groome and Warfield ended up getting positions with Rasin at the clerk's office. On election day, the organization would use "walking-around money" to ensure local Democrats "got out the white vote, rewarded the faithful, and made trouble for the rest". Mayor Ferdinand C. Latrobe described Rasin's machine as "unavoidable and perhaps helped make democracy work". Rasin and Gorman ran a political machine where they handled matters in a personal way and "stayed in touch with workingmen and clubmen alike".

In 1892, Rasin was elected as state insurance commissioner for Maryland by Maryland's Board of Public Works. He served in this role until he resigned in December 1896. During President Cleveland's second administration, Rasin was offered the role of United States consul to Berlin, Germany, but declined the role. Rasin helped John K. Cowen become a U.S. Representative. In 1905, Rasin actively took part in Gorman's effort to find an opponent against Isidor Rayner in the election of Attorney General of Maryland, but assisted Raynor in winning and, according to Gorman's journal, received significant payment from Rayner. After Gorman's death in 1906, Rasin continued as the last member of the "Old Guard" in the political machine until his death.

== Personal life ==
Rasin married Julia Ann Claypoole, daughter of Captain John Claypoole, on March 4, 1862. They had six children: John Freeman, Gertrude Browne, Julia Angela, Helen Ringgold, Carroll Wilson and Alice Regina. His wife died from breast cancer on July 1, 1899. John was the stepfather of Wallis Simpson, wife of Edward VIII.

Rasin died on March 9, 1907, at his house on the intersection of Calvert and Chase streets in Baltimore. He was buried at Green Mount Cemetery in Baltimore.
