= T. Leigh Marriott =

American politician (1871–1941)

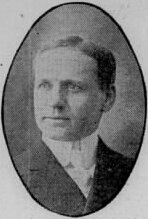
- Marriott in a 1905 newspaper

Member of the Maryland House of Delegates from the 3rd district
- In office 1905–1911

Personal details
- Born: Thomas Leigh Marriott; July 24, 1871 Howard County, Maryland, U.S.
- Died: December 21, 1941 (aged 70) Baltimore, Maryland, U.S.
- Resting place: Loudon Park Cemetery
- Party: Democratic
- Spouse: Kate Donegan Swartz (m. 1894)
- Children: 1
- Relatives: Arthur P. Gorman (uncle)
- Occupation: Politician; businessman

Thomas Leigh Marriott (July 24, 1871 – December 21, 1941) was an American politician from Maryland. He was a member of the Maryland House of Delegates from 1905 to 1911.

== Early life ==
Thomas Leigh Marriott was born on July 24, 1871, in Howard County, Maryland, to Mary (née Gorman) and Thomas Marriott. His father was an immigration inspector. He attended public schools in Howard County. His uncle was U.S. senator Arthur P. Gorman.

== Career ==
Marriott was a Democrat. He served as a member of the Maryland House of Delegates, representing the 3rd district, from 1905 to 1911. In the 1910 session, he was chairman of the temperance committee and he was a member of the rules, ways and means, and the Chesapeake Bay and its tributaries committees. During his service, he challenged the party leadership of John Mahon. He supported the passage of the gas monopoly real bills, the Pure Food Bill, the Corrupt Practices Act, and the public service law. In 1911, he supported Blair Lee over Arthur Pue Gorman Jr. for governor in 1911.

Marriott worked for Cumberland Coal Company for over 50 years. At the time of his death, he was superintendent of its Mount Clare yards and was a director of the company. He served as a member of the board of the Baltimore Eye, Ear and Throat Hospital for years before becoming the board's president in 1941.

== Personal life ==
Marriott married Kate Donegan Swartz, daughter of Alexander J. Swartz, in 1894. They had a daughter, Mary Leigh. They lived on West Mulberry Street in Baltimore.

Marriott died of heart disease on December 21, 1941, at Union Memorial Hospital in Baltimore. He was buried in Loudon Park Cemetery.
