= Warfield's Range =

Historic slave plantation home in Maryland, U.S.

Warfiled's Range
- Location within Maryland
- 39°09′13″N 76°52′30″W
- Location: 10504 Gorman Road (10504 Patuxent Ridge Road)

History
- Built: Eighteenth Century

Site notes
- Architectural style: Brick

Warfield's Range, also known as Philla Terra and Dr. Thomas Chew Warfield's Homestead, is a historic slave plantation home located between Laurel and Columbia in Howard County, Maryland.

On March 26, 1696, Richard and John Warfield surveyed a 1,080-acre land patent named Warfield's Range along with others that totaled 1,862 acres. A log cabin was built onsite during this time which survived until 2001. In 1703, Richard Warfield granted 150 acres of Warfield's Range including the cabin to his daughter Rachel Warfield Yates. In 1765, 240 acres of the range were inherited by Benjamin Warfield's son Joshua Warfield. In 1845 Thomas Chew Worthington updated the log cabin interior with random width wood floors.

After Peter Gorman completed his railroad contract, he purchased the 500-acre estate Fairview in North Laurel from Dr. Charles Griffith Worthington. The property was part of Warfiled's Range, containing the 1696 log cabin that survived until an arson fire in 2001 when relocated to accommodate the Warfield's Range development.

== See also ==
- List of Howard County properties in the Maryland Historical Trust
- Christ Church Guilford
- John T. Warfield House
