= Woodstock, Maryland =

Unincorporated community in Maryland

- Location in Maryland Woodstock (the United States)
- Coordinates: 39°19′43″N 76°52′19″W
- Country: United States of America
- State: Maryland
- County: Howard
- Elevation: 318 ft (97 m)

Population (2010)
  - Total: 6,986
- Time zone: UTC-5 (Eastern)
  - Summer (DST): UTC-4 (EDT)
- ZIP code: 21163
- Area code: 410, 443, 667
- GNIS: 591607

Woodstock is an unincorporated community which is a suburb of Baltimore, Maryland, United States. The original village of Woodstock is located in Howard County, and also includes portions of Baltimore County and Carroll County.

== History ==
Thomas Browne explored westward through Anne Arundel County through Clarksville and settled in the area in 1702. The Mt. Pleasant Log home was built by the Browne family in the 18th century. A century later during the Civil War, Confederate General Bradley Tyler Johnson used Mt. Pleasant to store weapons, dispatch messages and hide from Union troops.

Woodstock was founded as a mining town based around its granite quarries. The B&O Railroad ran through the area with a station built in 1835 for granite deliveries. The postal community was named "Davis Tavern" when its first post office opened in 1836. Caleb Davis and Peter Gorman were early B&O contractors. Gorman married Elizabeth Browne of the Browne family, occupied a large farm "Good Fellowship", sold granite for buildings and built a large granite house in town. The granite house was the birthplace of Arthur Pue Gorman, which was torn down to build a bridge across the Patapsco in the early 1980s. In 1869, the Jesuit Woodstock College opened on the Baltimore side of the Patapsco River. St. Alphonsus Rodriguez church was built on a section of the institute in 1887–1968 when it was lost to fire. In 1889, telegraph service was extended to town.

== Demographics ==
As of 2010, Woodstock's population is 6,986. The population growth rate is 31.51%.

=== Housing market ===
According to Sperling's BestPlaces, Woodstock's cost of living is 49.9% higher than the U.S. average, and the median cost per home in Woodstock is $422,290

=== Schools ===
Public schools in the area spend $6,343 per student, $665 more than the U.S. median. There are an average of 14.9 students per teacher.

Woodmont Academy opened in Woodstock in 1995. It would later close during a series of reforms and restructuring that its patron, the Legion of Christ, underwent.

== People ==
- Paul Blair lived in the Woodstock area at the time of his death on December 26, 2013
- Henry G. Davis (November 16, 1823 – March 11, 1916) was a self-made millionaire born in Woodstock and U.S. Senator (1871–1883) from West Virginia
- William Henry Gorman was born in Woodstock in 1843. He founded the Citizen's Bank of Laurel, Maryland and the Maryland and City Hotels in Annapolis, Maryland.
