= Samuel A. Merritt (Maryland politician) =

American politician (died 1904)

Member of the Maryland House of Delegates from the Kent County district
- In office 1874–1876 Serving with Jesse K. Hines
- Preceded by: James W. Hurtt and William B. Wilmer
- Succeeded by: Stephen A. Boyer and Lewin Usilton

Personal details
- Born: Samuel Augustus Merritt
- Died: July 29, 1904 (aged 74) Locust Grove, Kent County, Maryland, U.S.
- Party: Democratic
- Spouse: Laura Rasin
- Children: 4
- Occupation: Politician; farmer

Samuel Augustus Merritt (died July 29, 1904) was an American politician from Maryland. He served as a member of the Maryland House of Delegates, representing Kent County.

== Biography ==
Samuel Augustus Merritt was a Democrat. He served as a member of the Maryland House of Delegates, representing Kent County from 1874 to 1876. He worked in agriculture in upper Kent County.

Merritt married Laura Rasin, daughter of Unit Rasin. They had four children, Henrietta Elizabeth, Mrs. H. N. McCampbell, Samuel A. and Macall Medford. He died on July 29, 1904, aged 74, at his near Locust Grove, Kent County.
