= William Henry Gorman =

American businessman (1843–1915)

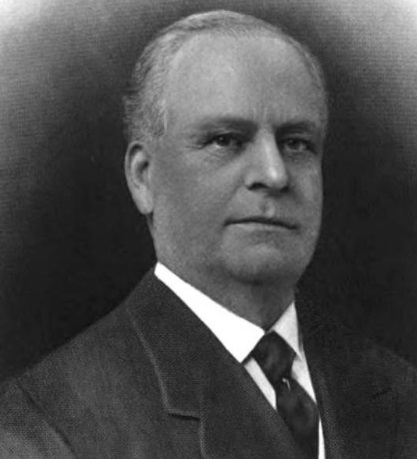
- From Volume IV (1912) of Men of Mark in Maryland
- Born: August 29, 1843; Woodstock, Maryland, U.S.
- Died: July 7, 1915 (aged 71); Bedford Springs, Pennsylvania, U.S.
- Resting place: Loudon Park Cemetery, Baltimore, Maryland, U.S.
- Education: Borromeo College, Pikesville, Maryland, (now part of St. Mary's Seminary and University, Roland Park, north Baltimore)
- Occupation: Businessman
- Spouses: Margaret Bradley (m. 1857) Mary Clark (m. 1887) Ada Rogers (m. 1903)
- Parent(s): Peter Gorman, Elizabeth Brown (Gorman)
- Relatives: Arthur Pue Gorman (brother)

William Henry Gorman (August 29, 1843 – July 7, 1915) was a co-founder of the Citizens Bank of Maryland. Born and raised in the Baltimore area, he was the younger brother of Arthur Pue Gorman (1839–1906), an influential political leader and longtime United States Senator from Maryland. William was a successful businessman, leading and investing in various financial institutions and public utility companies in Maryland, as well as a coal company and railroad in West Virginia.

== Early life ==
He was born in Woodstock, Maryland. William Gorman was the younger brother of Arthur Pue Gorman, an influential political leader who served in the Maryland House of Delegates, then the State Senate, and was elected by the General Assembly of Maryland (state legislature) to several terms in the United States Senate in Washington, D.C. during the late 19th and early 20th centuries. William was raised at a farmstead called "Good Fellowship" – dating back to the original colonial era land grant by the Lord Baltimore, Cecilius Calvert, 2nd Baron Baltimore (1605–1675), as Lord Proprietor of the colony and Province of Maryland) – as well as a family home in Laurel, Maryland. He went to school at Borromeo College (now part of St. Mary's Seminary and University in the Roland Park neighborhood of northwest Baltimore, founded 1791), then in Pikesville, Maryland, northwest of Baltimore in rural outlying Baltimore County; the small college was Roman Catholic in affiliation and existed briefly from 1860 to 1872.

== Career ==
In 1866, Gorman served as the deputy revenue collector alongside his brother. In 1871 in the state capital of Annapolis, Maryland, he founded the Maryland and City Hotel, advertised in 1876 as a summer resort. In 1874, he also co-founded the Annapolis Savings Institution, the Annapolis Water Company, and the Annapolis Gas and Electric Light Company. While Gorman was its president, the publicly held water company issued 6-percent annual dividends in the early 1880s.

In 1875, Gorman declined for personal reasons an opportunity to serve as a Democratic Party's candidate for alderman of the city of Annapolis.

In 1884, Gorman moved north to the state's biggest city and port of Baltimore, Maryland and started investing in coal companies. He was the president of The Piedmont Mining Company formed in 1898, and the Gorman Coal and Coke Company. Gorman was also on the board of directors of the West Virginia Central and Pittsburgh Railway, later the Piedmont and Cumberland Railway.

In 1890, Gorman co-founded and was named a director of the Citizens Bank of Maryland. In 1891, Gorman and his brother Arthur founded the Cumberland Coal Company in Tucker County, West Virginia with 300 employees and 140 coke ovens.

Gorman and his father Peter were the proprietors of several quarries in the Laurel area and adjacent Prince George's County, Maryland (northeast and east of Washington) that supplied granite and stone for the U.S. Treasury Department building (east of the White House) and the 1850s building expansion project of the new House of Representatives and the Senate wings of the United States Capitol, in Washington, D.C., along with material for bridge construction on the Baltimore and Ohio Railroad, first passenger railway in the country, begun 1827–1828.

In January 1902, Gorman was added as a director of Citizens National Bank.

== Personal life and death ==
Gorman married Margaret Bradley on February 1, 1857; she died on October 21, 1861, at age 25, after a short but severe illness. He later married Mary Clark, who died on January 23, 1887, and is interred at Loudon Park Cemetery. Gorman married Ada Rogers, widow of Judge Edward Thomas Boykin, in a private ceremony on June 18, 1903, in Concord, North Carolina.

Gorman purchased property in the streetcar suburban village of Catonsville, Maryland's Oak Forest Park neighborhood (of the then rural surrounding Baltimore County) in 1896 for $2500 and contracted with William Gerwig in 1897 to build a country residence there.

Gorman's daughters, Nora and Elizabeth, both announced their engagements in September 1903, to marry E.G. Ballenger of Tryon, North Carolina, and J. William McMillan of Knoxville, Tennessee, respectively. Nora died at her Atlanta home in July 1912 of typhoid fever.

William Gorman's son Douglas married Shirley Gwendolyn Nash of Savannah, Georgia, in February 1912.

Gorman was ill at home in January 1915, before leaving for a week in Florida with his wife to recuperate. They went to Bedford Springs, Pennsylvania, in late June to spend the summer there among the mountain water springs. Gorman died at Bedford Springs on July 7, 1915, after a stroke of paralysis on July 3, and is buried at Loudon Park Cemetery, between Frederick Avenue / the National Road on the northside and Wilkens Avenue on the south, in the Irvington neighborhood of southwest Baltimore. His funeral was held at St. Timothy's Protestant Episcopal Church in Catonsville, where he had served as a vestryman. After two weeks in Atlantic City, New Jersey, where they had previously visited, his third wife and widow Ada Rogers Boykin Gorman returned to her former Concord, North Carolina home in August 1915.

Gorman's son Albert married Sallie Dorsey Owings of Ellicott City, Maryland (the county seat of Howard County), in December 1915. He married Eloise Stewart in December 1929 and they separated in September 1932, with Eloise filing for divorce two months later. son Albert died in Baltimore in October 1937 at age 52 after two years of illness.

Upon its sale in May 1916, the Gorman's Catonsville home was described as having "18 rooms and 3 bathrooms" on about 2.75 acres (1.11 ha), fronting about 390 feet (120 m) along Montrose Avenue.
