= Stephen A. Boyer =

American politician (1828–1904)

Member of the Maryland House of Delegates from the Kent County district
- In office 1878–1880 Serving with Lewin Usilton
- Preceded by: Jesse K. Hines and Samuel A. Merritt
- Succeeded by: George W. Spencer and George H. Thompson
- In office 1868–1870 Serving with Horatio Beck
- Preceded by: Horatio Beck and William Welch
- Succeeded by: Horatio Beck and William B. Wilmer

Personal details
- Born: March 31, 1828 Kent County, Maryland, U.S.
- Died: April 12, 1904 (aged 76) Middletown, Delaware, U.S.
- Resting place: near Massey, Maryland, U.S.
- Party: Democratic
- Spouse: Agnes (died 1902)
- Occupation: Politician; farmer

Stephen A. Boyer (March 31, 1828 – April 12, 1904) was an American politician from Maryland. He served as a member of the Maryland House of Delegates, representing Kent County from 1868 to 1870 and 1878 to 1880.

== Early life ==
Stephen A. Boyer was born on March 31, 1828, in Kent County, Maryland.

== Career ==
Boyer was a Democrat. He served as a member of the Maryland House of Delegates, representing Kent County from 1868 to 1870 and from 1876 to 1878.

Boyer owned several farms near Sassafras, Maryland.

== Personal life ==
Boyer married Agnes. His wife died in 1902. He was a vestryman of St. Clements Protestant Episcopal Church in Massey and St. Anne's Church in Middletown, Delaware. He moved to Middletown in 1895. He lived on Cass Street and West Main Street in Middletown.

Boyer died on April 12, 1904, in Middletown. He was buried at "Homestead" near Massey.
