= John T. Warfield House =

- Location within Maryland
- 39°08′32″N 76°52′18″W
- Nearest city: North Laurel, Maryland

History
- Built: 1885

Site notes
- Architectural style: Gothic Revival

The John T. Warfield House is a historic house in North Laurel in the U.S. state of Maryland. The site is currently owned by the Maryland Milk Producers Association.

John T. Warfield was a civil war draftee from Howard County. He married Rachel Virginia Dorsey in 1862, and with their sons Lee Clagett and Seth lived at the 188-acre (76 ha) estate until 1899.

The house is a one-story three-bay-wide wood building on a stone foundation built in 1885 for John T. Warfield.

The Maryland State Highway administration hired the company Traceries to document the historical status of the property. The auditor described the site as non-historical, although John T. Warfield's other house of similar design, construction, era and architecture in Montgomery County was considered significantly historic.

== See also ==
- Melvin J. Berman
- Dorsey family
