= Jesse K. Hines =

American politician (1829–1889)

Member of the Maryland House of Delegates from the Kent County district
- In office 1874–1876 Serving with Samuel A. Merritt
- Preceded by: James W. Hurtt and William B. Wilmer
- Succeeded by: Stephen A. Boyer and Lewin Usilton

Personal details
- Born: Jesse Knock Hines; November 17, 1829
- Died: September 20, 1889 (aged 59) Baltimore, Maryland, U.S.
- Resting place: Chestertown, Maryland, U.S.
- Party: Know Nothing; Union; Democratic
- Children: 4
- Occupation: Politician; clerk

Jesse Knock Hines (November 17, 1829 – September 20, 1889) was a Democratic member of the Maryland House of Delegates from Kent County and served as the Speaker of the House for the 1874 session.

== Early life ==
Jesse Knock Hines was born on November 17, 1829. He was later admitted to the Chestertown bar in 1868.

== Career ==
Hines was a clerk of the Circuit Court for Kent County from 1857 to 1873. During his tenure as clerk, he was associated with the Know Nothing, Unionist and Democratic parties. He served as a captain in the Union Army during the Civil War.

Hines was a Democrat. He was a member at the 1872 Democratic National Convention. He served as speaker of the house and as a member of the Maryland House of Delegates, representing Kent County from 1874 to 1876. Politically, he was associated with Arthur Pue Gorman's political machine.

In May 1874, Hines was appointed as commander of the Maryland Oyster Police Force. He resigned the role in 1876. In 1876, he became an assessment and corporation clerk in the office of the state comptroller. In 1877, he was appointed an insurance commissioner for Maryland.

Hines was the third state insurance commissioner, from 1877 until his death. In 1881, he fought "graveyard insurance" companies whose policies had become a popular means for western Marylanders to speculate on others' deaths.

== Personal life ==
Hines married and had four children.

Hines died of pneumonia on September 20, 1889, in Baltimore. He was buried in Chestertown.

Political offices
Preceded by Arthur Pue Gorman	Speaker of the Maryland House of Delegates; 1874	Succeeded by Lewis C. Smith
