= Arthur P. Gorman =

American politician and baseball player (1839–1906)

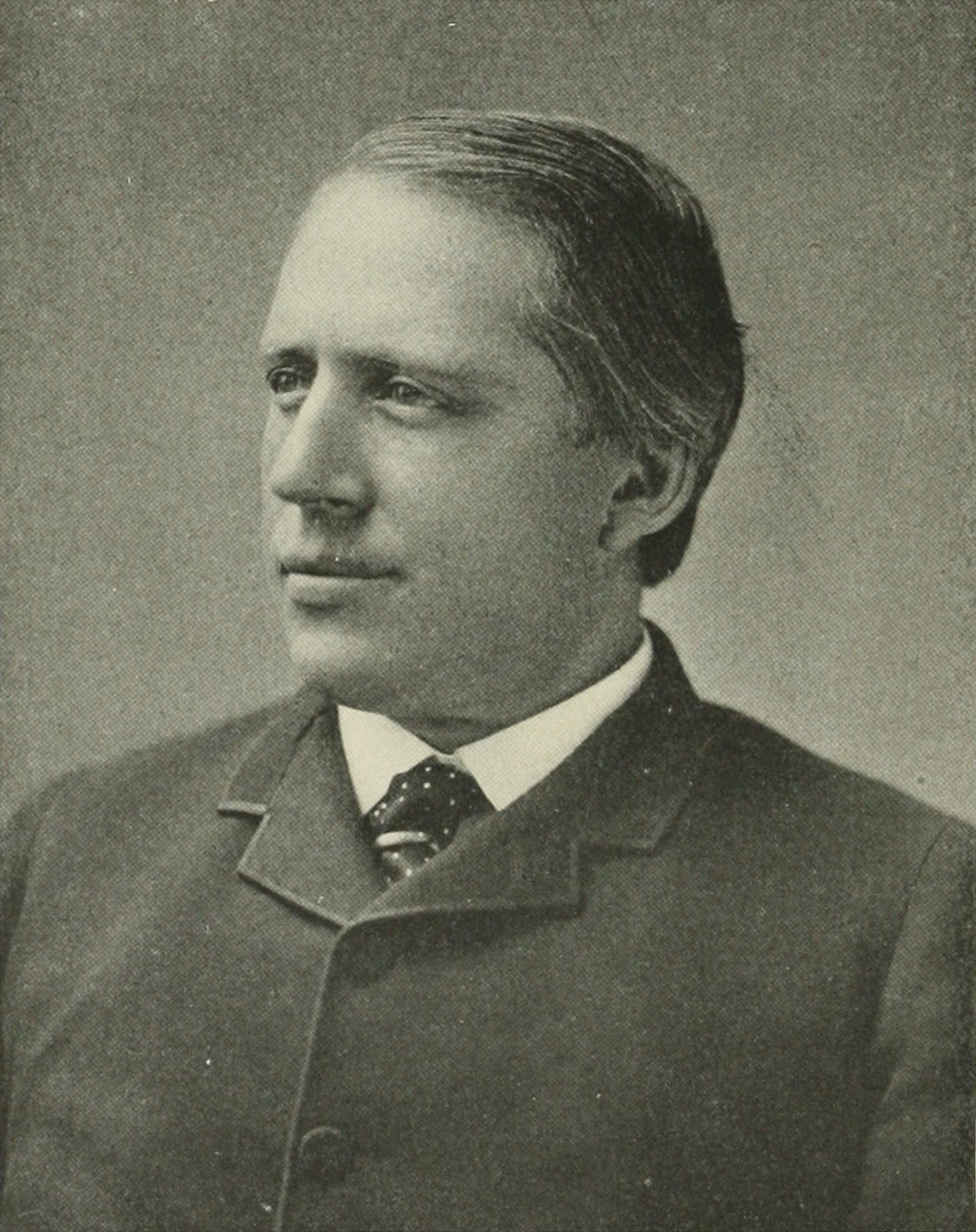
- Gorman c. 1899

Chairman of the Senate Democratic Caucus
- In office March 4, 1903 – June 4, 1906
- Preceded by: James Kimbrough Jones
- Succeeded by: Joseph Clay Stiles Blackburn
- In office May 3, 1890 – April 1898
- Preceded by: James B. Beck
- Succeeded by: David Turpie

United States Senator from Maryland
- In office March 4, 1903 – June 4, 1906
- Preceded by: George Wellington
- Succeeded by: William Pinkney Whyte
- In office March 4, 1881 – March 3, 1899
- Preceded by: William Pinkney Whyte
- Succeeded by: Louis E. McComas

Member of the Maryland Senate from Howard County
- In office 1875–1881
- Preceded by: John Lee Carroll
- Succeeded by: Edwin Warfield

Speaker of the Maryland House of Delegates
- In office 1872–1874
- Preceded by: Ferdinand Claiborne Latrobe
- Succeeded by: Jesse K. Hines

Member of the Maryland House of Delegates from Howard County
- In office 1869–1875 Serving with William Matthews Merrick (1869–1871), Edward Linthicum (1871–1875)
- Preceded by: John R. Clark, I. Thomas Jones
- Succeeded by: Littleton Maclin, Claudius Stewart

Personal details
- Born: March 11, 1839 Woodstock, Maryland, U.S.
- Died: June 4, 1906 (aged 67) Washington, D.C., U.S.
- Resting place: Oak Hill Cemetery; Washington, D.C., U.S.
- Party: Democratic
- Spouse: Hannah "Hattie" Donagan (m. 1867)
- Children: 6, including Arthur Jr.
- Parent: Peter Gorman (father)
- Relatives: William Henry Gorman (brother); T. Leigh Marriott (nephew); Henry Gassaway Davis (cousin)

Arthur Pue Gorman (March 11, 1839 – June 4, 1906) was an American politician. He was leader of the Gorman-Rasin organization with Isaac Freeman Rasin that controlled the Maryland Democratic Party from the late 1870s until his death in 1906. Gorman served as United States Senator from Maryland from 1881 to 1899 and again from 1903 until his death. He was a prominent leader of the Bourbon Democrat faction of the Democratic Party. Gorman was Chairman of the Democratic National Committee during Grover Cleveland's 1884 presidential campaign and he is widely credited with securing Cleveland's victory. In 1952 Gorman was described in The Baltimore Sun as "easily the most powerful political figure [Maryland] has ever known."

As a young man, Gorman also played a prominent role in the early development of baseball in Washington, D.C. He was a founding member of the original Washington Nationals of the National Association, the first American baseball team, and became one of the nation's star players by 1864. Later in life, he served as a member of the Mills Commission which investigated the origins of the sport.

== Early life and career ==
Gorman was born in Woodstock, Maryland on March 11, 1839. His father was Peter Gorman, a construction contractor, and his mother was Elizabeth A. Gorman (née Brown). Arthur was named after the family physician, Dr. Arthur Pue. He was the first of five children, including William.

Gorman's paternal grandfather, John, emigrated to the U.S. from Ireland circa 1794, first settling in Harrisburg, Pennsylvania before moving to the Baltimore area.

The Gorman family moved to Howard County, Maryland around 1845, where Peter Gorman bought a 150-acre (61 ha) farm several miles from Laurel. Gorman attended Howard County public schools and for at least one year his father hired a tutor to teach him and neighboring students.

In 1850, Peter Gorman used his connections to Maryland Congressmen William T. Hamilton and Edward Hammond to arrange for 11-year old Arthur to serve as a U.S. Senate page. Gorman became friends with prominent Illinois Senator Stephen A. Douglas, who made Gorman his private secretary. Some sources state that Gorman accompanied Douglas during his debates with Abraham Lincoln in 1858, although biographer John R. Lambert questions these accounts. Gorman continued to work for the senate throughout the 1850s and 1860s, including positions as messenger, assistant doorkeeper, and assistant postmaster. In 1866, he was appointed Postmaster. Gorman's experience in the Senate gave him extensive knowledge of parliamentary procedures that he would put to use during his political career.

During the American Civil War, Gorman was a pro-Union Democrat. In September 1866, Republicans who held the senate majority removed him as postmaster because he supported President Andrew Johnson's Reconstruction policies. Johnson immediately appointed Gorman as Collector of Internal Revenue for the Fifth Congressional District of Maryland.

== Baseball ==
At the age of 20 in 1859, Gorman was one of the founding members of the Washington Nationals, the first fully professional baseball team in America. He rose to become a star by the end of the Civil War era. According to contemporary accounts, Gorman was the team's standout left fielder, but often substituted or filled in at every other position, including pitcher and catcher.

In 1867, he led the Nationals in their first trip over the mountains, in which they beat every midwest team except Rockford, Illinois, which had Albert Spalding as its pitcher. Also in 1867, Gorman was elected to a one-year term as president of the National Association of Base Ball Players.

In 1891, as part of an expanded National League, a Washington franchise was added. Originally called the Washington Statesmen, the team was renamed "Senators" to honor Gorman. While this team folded in 1899, subsequent franchises would use the "Senators" name until 1971. In February 1903, Gorman and his son-in-law Wilton Lambert attempted but failed to buy the Washington Senators baseball team.

== Early political career ==
Gorman was elected to the Maryland House of Delegates in 1869, serving until 1875; he served as Speaker of the House for one session.

Gorman was closely aligned with Baltimore political leader Isaac Freeman Rasin and supported William Pinkney Whyte for Governor in 1871. Whyte, in turn, gave Gorman a position as director of the C&O Canal.

In 1875, he was elected to the Maryland State Senate, serving until 1881.

== U.S. Senator ==
In 1880, the Maryland legislature elected Gorman to the United States Senate, where he soon became a leader of the Bourbon Democrats. The New York Times reported that the previous legislative election was influenced by large groups of "ward rounders" who shot and wounded black Republican voters at the Howard County polls.

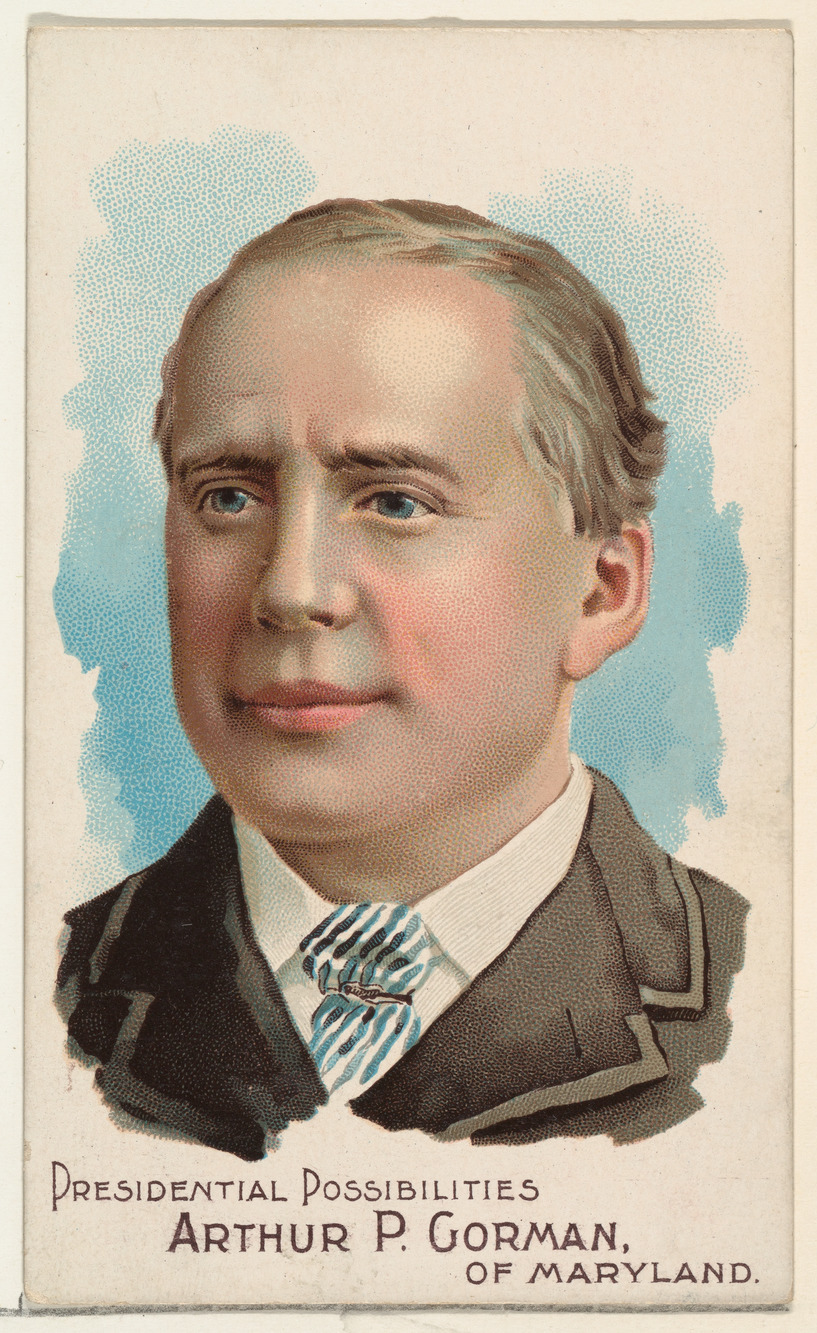
An 1888 tobacco company trading card speculates on Gorman's chances for the presidency.

In 1884 Gorman became chairman of the National Democratic Committee and served as campaign manager for Democratic presidential candidate Grover Cleveland. Cleveland faced Republican candidate James Blaine in the election. The campaign was an extremely negative and close one. Blaine actively courted the Irish Catholic vote and he publicized that his mother was Catholic. On Wednesday October 29, Blaine attended a meeting with Protestant clergymen in New York City. At the meeting, Rev. Samuel D. Burchard made an introductory speech in which he denounced the Democratic Party as the party of "rum, Romanism and rebellion". The fatigued Blaine did not hear the comment and when he spoke, he failed to correct this attack on Catholicism. Gorman, who was operating from Democratic headquarters in New York, had sent a stenographic reporter to cover the meeting. After learning what Burchard had said, Gorman immediately recognized the importance of the "rum, Romanism and rebellion" comment and went to work. Within hours cities with large Catholic populations were blanketed with posters and handbills with the letters "R.R.R." on them and dispatches were sent to newspapers across the country. Blaine tried to make a disclaimer, but the damage was done. The November 4 election was determined by New York, which Cleveland won by only 1,149 votes (0.1% of the total vote). Gorman's handling of the Cleveland campaign, including the "rum, Romanism and rebellion" comment, was widely recognized as the decisive factor in securing Cleveland's victory.

He served as the Democratic caucus chairman from 1890 to 1898. He chaired the Committee on Printing (53rd Congress) and served on the Committee on Private Land Claims (55th Congress).

He played a major role in financial and tariff legislation, especially the Wilson-Gorman Tariff of 1894, which successfully lowered tariffs in response to the McKinley Act of 1890, but thwarted President Cleveland's effort at completely or nearly free trade.

Gorman was reelected twice more in 1886 and 1892 but was defeated for re-election in 1898, losing to Louis E. McComas. After his defeat, Gorman campaigned for Maryland's other U.S. Senate seat and was elected again by the Legislature in 1902. He was again appointed as the Democratic Caucus Chairman, which he held from 1903 to 1906.

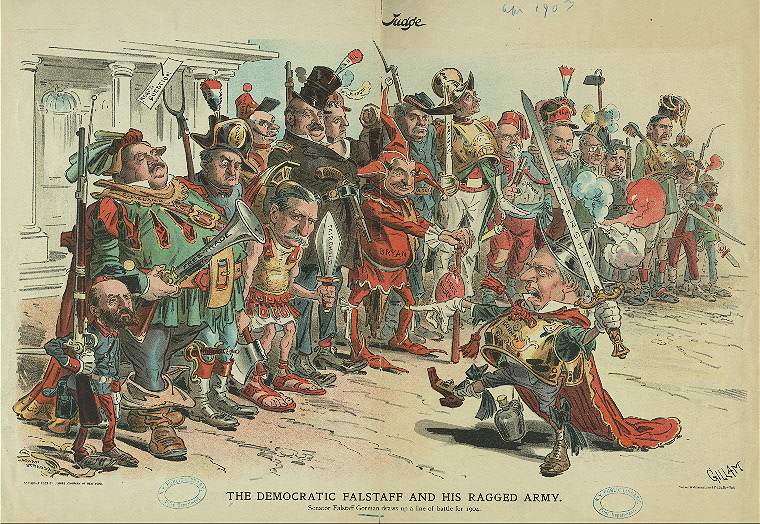
Satirical cartoon depicting Gorman leading Democrats in the 1902 election

Gorman was briefly a candidate for U.S. president in 1892 and 1904.

=== Racial politics ===
In 1889, Gorman sought to differentiate his party from a growing mixed-race coalition of Republicans and independent Democrats. He was quoted as saying, "We have determined that this government was made by white men and shall be ruled by white men as long as the republic lasts."

In his final years, according to the Maryland State Archives' biography, Gorman "spearheaded an attempt by Democrats to disenfranchise black voters in Maryland, who tended to vote Republican." Related legislation passed easily in the Democratically controlled Senate of early 1904, though Governor Warfield did not sign the bill into law, and it was rejected by voters in late 1905.

== Personal life and family ==
Gorman married a widow, Hannah T. "Hattie" Donagan, on March 28, 1867. She was born c. 1836 in Reading, Pennsylvania, the daughter of George P. Donagan, and her first marriage c. 1853 was to Alexander Jordan Swartz, who was a mayor of Reading for a term before later working in Washington, D.C. and dying c. 1864. T. Leigh Marriott, a nephew via Gorman's sister Mary, married a Swartz daughter and was a state delegate.

Gorman served as a director and eventually president of the Chesapeake & Ohio Canal Company; the canal ran along the north shore of the Potomac River from Georgetown above Washington, D.C., to Cumberland, Maryland.

The Gormans had five daughters and one son: Ada, Haddie, Grace, Anne Elizabeth ("Bessie"), Mary and Arthur P. Jr. In 1890, Gorman's wife and daughter Grace escaped a fire at their Laurel house "Fairview"; a new Queen Anne style house was built in its place the following year.

=== Haddie Gorman Gambrill ===
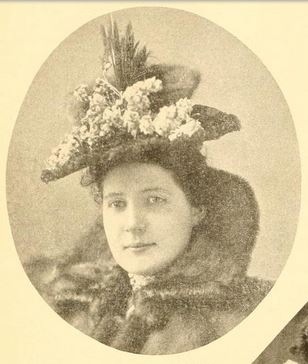
Haddie Gorman in 1895

Gorman's eldest daughter, Haddie, married Stephen Warfield Gambrill in 1900. Her husband later served as a Maryland state delegate, state senator, and U.S. representative.

=== Ada Gorman ===
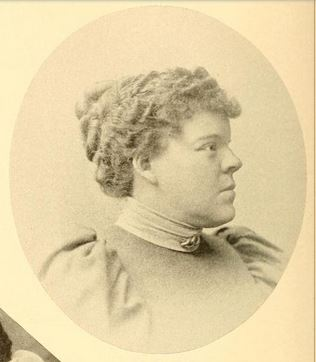
Ada Gorman in 1895

Gorman's daughter Ada married Charles Joseph Magness, a young man about half her age, against her family's wishes in 1908. Magness was soon thereafter imprisoned for desertion from the U.S. Navy. Upon his release a year later, the couple lived in Washington, D.C., and then the Baltimore suburb of Lutherville.

When her mother died in 1910, Ada was cut off from her share of the Gorman family estate. The marriage lasted a total of 14 years before Ada divorced in 1922 due to her husband's infidelity. She died childless and with few friends in the spring of 1950.

=== Grace "Daisy" Gorman Johnson ===
Gorman's daughter Grace (better known as Daisy) married Richard Alward Johnson, the first manager of the Laurel race track and later a Maryland state senator, in 1895. They had two children, Richard Jr. and Grace. They lived at the historic Overlook farmhouse in North Laurel, which was built for Daisy on the family property in 1911. (This home was later owned from 1952 to 2018 by diplomat and businessman Kingdon Gould Jr., who raised his family and died there.) The town of Daisy in Howard County, Maryland, is named in Gorman's daughter's honor. Her son, Richard Jr., raised and trained horses, and her daughter, Grace Johnson, later married Braxton Bragg Comer Jr., son of former Alabama governor B. B. Comer.

=== Arthur Gorman Jr. ===
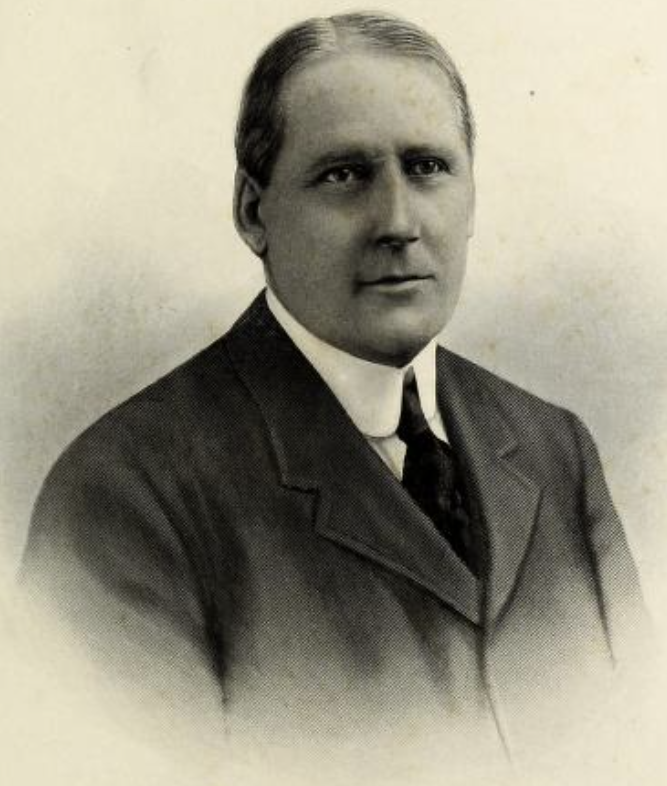
Arthur P. Gorman Jr. c. 1914

Gorman's only son, Arthur Jr., attended Lawrenceville Prep and played on the Maryland Agricultural College football team in 1892 and 1893 as a fullback. In 1898, Arthur Jr. founded the Piedmont Mining Company in Maryland and West Virginia with his uncle William and Thomas L. Marriott. He married Grace Norris on November 28, 1900. Arthur Jr. served as a Maryland state senator (1904–1910), the last year during which he was Senate President.

Arthur Jr. was nominated for Governor of Maryland in 1911, but narrowly lost to Republican Phillips Lee Goldsborough. He was later a state tax commissioner, until his death in 1919 due to complications from diabetes.

=== Bessie Gorman Lambert ===
Gorman's daughter Bessie married Princeton graduate and Democratic speechwriter Wilton J. Lambert on June 24, 1896, at the Gormans' Washington home on the corner of 15th and K Streets. They had two children, Elizabeth (b. 1897) and Arthur. An attorney, Lambert helped Bessie's father attempt to buy the Washington Senators baseball team in February 1903. Bessie's son, Arthur Gorman Lambert (1899–1991), was a member of Princeton's class of 1922, also practiced law, and founded Suburban Hospital in Bethesda, Maryland; he unveiled a donated portrait of his grandfather, Arthur Pue Gorman, at the Capitol in 1943.

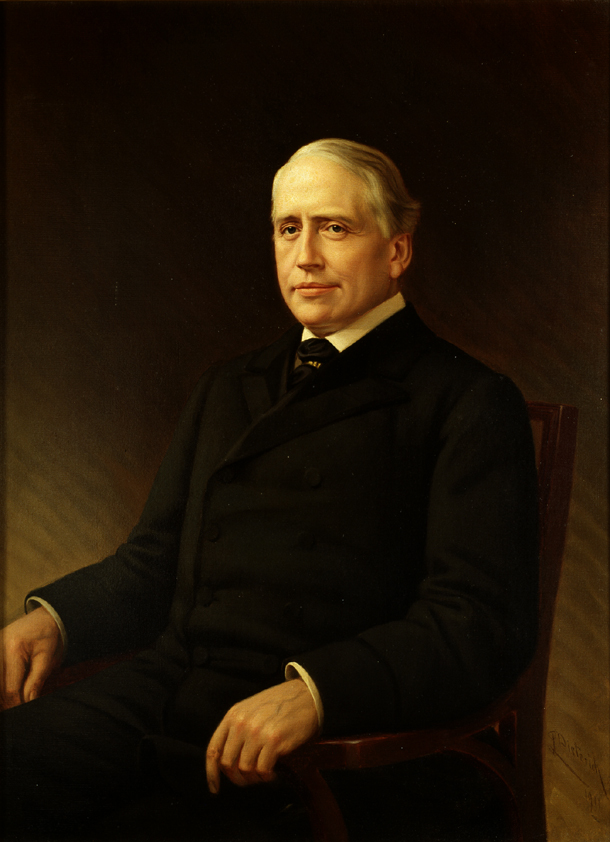
Gorman's Senate portrait, by Louis P. Dieterich, 1911

=== Mary Gorman Hills ===
Gorman's youngest daughter, Mary, married Ralph Warren Hills on February 27, 1901. Their son, Ralph Gorman Hills, won a bronze medal for shot put at the 1924 Summer Olympics. He graduated from Princeton University, after which he earned an M.D. degree from Johns Hopkins University and became a doctor; his first son, J. Dixon Hills, also chose to become a physician.

Gorman's great-grandson, Ralph Warren Hills Jr., was a WBAL television producer in Baltimore.

== Death and legacy ==
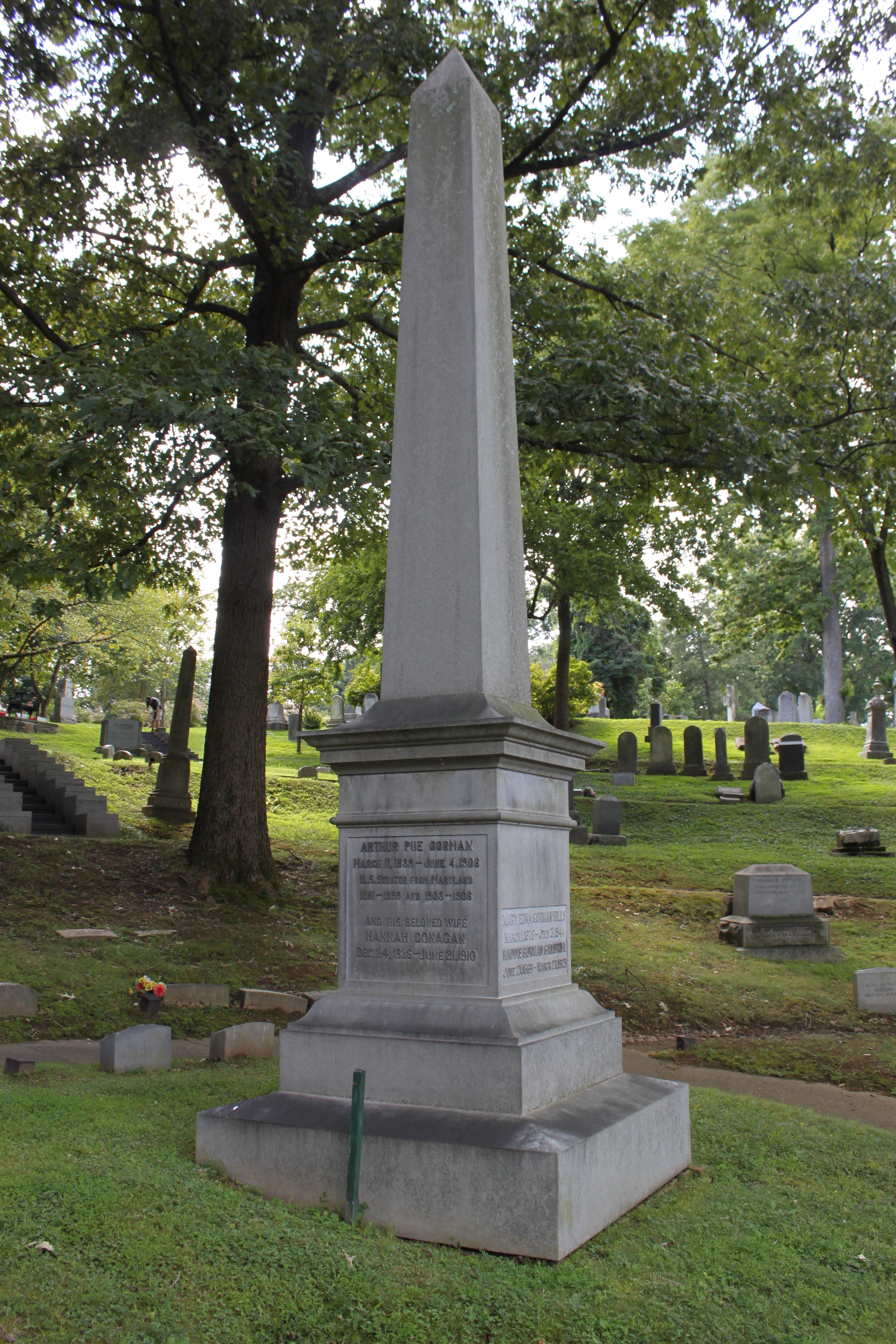
Grave of Gorman at Oak Hill Cemetery

Gorman served as a U.S. senator until his death from a heart attack in Washington, D.C., on June 4, 1906. He had been ill with stomach trouble and had not left his Washington house since mid-January. He was interred at Oak Hill Cemetery in Washington, D.C. Gorman's wife became ill soon after his death, and died on June 21, 1910.

=== Legacy ===
Gorman, Maryland and Gormania, West Virginia, are named after him, as is Gorman Road in North Laurel. An elementary school near this road is named "Gorman Crossing".

The repair ship USS Tutuila was originally named SS Arthur P. Gorman in August 1943.

In 2000, a proposed neighborhood within the Kings Contrivance section of Columbia, Maryland was to be named "Gorman's Promise," but the naming was canceled after consideration of Gorman's involvement in the disenfranchisement of black voters.

== See also ==
- List of members of the United States Congress who died in office (1900–1949)

== Bibliography ==
- Dodge, Andrew R. (2005). Biographical Directory of the United States Congress: 1774–2005. Washington, D.C.: U.S. Government Printing Office. ISBN 9780160731761.
- Lambert, John R. Arthur Pue Gorman (1953), the standard scholarly biography
  - Lambert, "Arthur Pue Gorman: Practical Politician" (PhD dissertation, Princeton University; ProQuest Dissertations & Theses, 1947. 0010944), online at academic libraries.
- United States Congress. "Arthur P. Gorman (id: G000326)". Biographical Directory of the United States Congress.
- Arthur Pue Gorman, late a senator from Maryland, Memorial addresses delivered in the House of Representatives and Senate frontispiece 1907

Political offices
Preceded by Ferdinand Claiborne Latrobe	Speaker of the Maryland House of Delegates; 1872	Succeeded by Jesse K. Hines
U.S. Senate
Preceded by William Whyte	U.S. Senator (Class 1) from Maryland; 1881–1899; Served alongside: James Groome, Ephraim Wilson, Charles Gibson, George Wellington	Succeeded by Louis E. McComas
New office	Chair of the Senate District of Columbia Corporations Committee; 1892–1893	Succeeded by Nelson W. Aldrich
Preceded by Charles F. Manderson	Chair of the Senate Printing Committee; 1893–1895	Succeeded by Eugene Hale
Preceded by Isham G. Harris	Chair of the Senate Private Land Claims Committee; 1898	Succeeded by James Kimbrough Jones
Preceded by George Wellington	U.S. Senator (Class 3) from Maryland; 1903–1906; Served alongside: Louis E. McComas, Isidor Rayner	Succeeded by William Whyte
Party political offices
Preceded by James B. Beck	Chair of the Senate Democratic Caucus; 1890–1898	Succeeded by David Turpie
Preceded by James Kimbrough Jones	Chair of the Senate Democratic Caucus; 1903–1906	Succeeded by Joseph Clay Stiles Blackburn
