= Robert J. Slater =

Baltimore gambling club owner and political boss

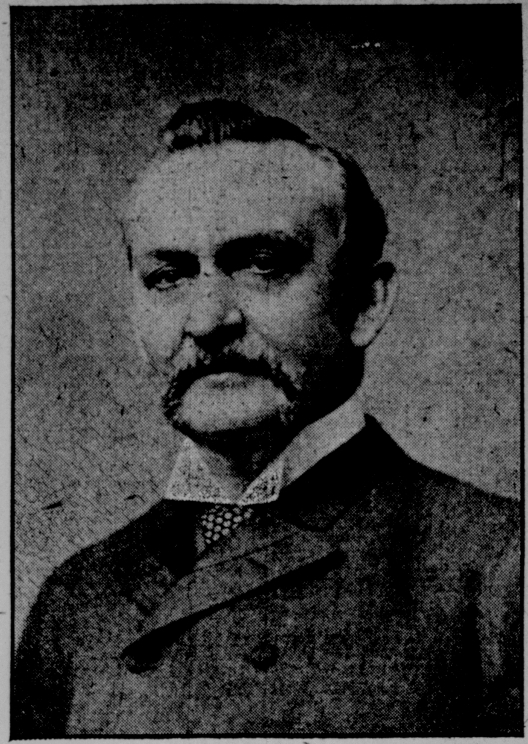
"Doc" Slater, a generous supporter of orphans, grandmothers, sporting men and politicians. He was proprietor of the grandest gambling club in Baltimore.

Robert J. Slater aka Doc Slater (July 1837 – May 3, 1902) was a gambling club owner, sporting man, and political boss prominent in Baltimore, Maryland during the post-Civil War era. He was the owner of the principal gambling club in Baltimore, which was patronized by the state's elite, including politicians, wealthy businessmen, wealthy farmers, and prominent visitors. He was a Democratic-Conservative ward boss who it was said carried the whole of East Baltimore in his pocket. He also controlled gambling clubs in other cities and was known nationally.

== Biography ==
Slater was born into a working-class family in the Butchers Hill neighborhood of East Baltimore, where his father worked as a butcher and bacon cutter. In his early 20s he became involved in street violence as a leader within the "Plug Uglies", a nativist gang associated with the Know-Nothing party that used force to suppress immigrant voting. He then became involved in running Faro, a fast-paced card game similar to roulette that was more popular than poker in the mid-19th century. It was initially a legitimate low-stakes game that yielded significant profits. However, after attempting to run honest games, he lost all his money and fell into debt. Wanting to rebuild his finances, he accepted a $100,000 investment from a Washington, D.C. card shark on the condition that he operate a "crooked" game. This launched his career as a high-end gambling proprietor.

In 1870, Slater established the Maryland Gentlemen's Club House at 10 South Calvert Street, a lavishly decorated establishment featuring expensive art, gourmet dining, and high-stakes gambling. Known for his impeccable dress, Slater had a reputation for generosity, and the status of a political boss. He leveraged his wealth and ability to mobilize voters to secure city patronage ie. the right to doll out government jobs and contracts. This also bought police protection for his illegal enterprise. Despite fourteen indictments between 1868 and 1877 for running an illegal gambling house, he escaped with fines, it was the cost of doing business. However, in 1877, Judge George William Brown sentenced him to five months in jail. Governor John Lee Carroll, who Slater helped to elect, issued a pardon after Slater had served fewer than sixty days, officially citing health concerns.

Slater's political career was defined by a rivalry with fellow Democratic boss Isaac Freeman Rasin for control of Baltimore's Democratic Conservative party. During the 1880s, Slater often aligned with other factions to challenge Rasin's dominance. This included going so far as supporting the "Fusion" reform ticket in the violent and fraudulent mayoral election of 1885. Although Rasin triumphed and removed Slater's followers from city jobs, Slater's club remained open. The national economic and political upheavals of the early 1890s put the Democrats in Baltimore on the defensive, and it led to a Grand Jury investigation and the withdrawal of police protection for gambling houses throughout the city as the populace became more reform minded. Slater permanently closed his Calvert Street club in 1894. The subsequent election of 1895 swept the Democratic machine out of power entirely.

In his final years, Slater briefly operated a summer resort in New Jersey but retired for good in 1901 likely due to health issues. While he was known for his personal abstinence from alcohol and profanity, he lost the bulk of his fortune betting on horse racing. He died in May 1902 from a throat tumor, he was known as a heavy lifetime cigar smoker. He had no children. Most of his estate went to his wife; and a favored but troubled nephew who attempted with tragic results to emulate his uncle's "sporting" life; he ended up losing everything and living on the streets.
