= Pairo =

Pairo is a surname. Notable people with the surname include:

- Miquel Crusafont i Pairó (1910–1983), Spanish paleontologist
- Preston A. Pairo Jr. (1927–2010), American politician from Maryland
- W. Harry Pairo (died 1925), American politician from Maryland
