= Edward Ingle =

American newspaper editor (1861–1924)

Edward Ingle (1861–1924) was a newspaper editor in Baltimore and Richmond, Virginia and wrote books about the American South, African Americans, as well as religious and public offices in Maryland and Virginia. He edited the Richmond Times and Manufacturers Record.

He was born in Baltimore, Maryland and attended Johns Hopkins during its early years. He wrote about the first ten years of Johns Hopkins. The school published some of his books.

Johns Hopkins has some of his correspondence.

== Books and writings ==
- Southern Sidelight; a picture of Social and Economic Life in the South a Generation Before the War Thomas Y. Crowell & Co. (1896)
- The Negro in the District of Columbia Johns Hopkins Press (1893)
- Captain Richard Ingle, the Maryland "pirate and rebel," 1642–1653
- Justices of the Peace of Colonial Virginia 1757–1775
- Local Institutions of Virginia
- Parish institutions of Maryland : with illustrations from parish records Johns Hopkins University (1883)
