= Joseph Darling =

Joseph Darling may refer to:

- Joe Darling (1870–1946), Australian cricketer
- Joseph Robinson Darling (1872–1957), United States Department of Justice, author, promoter, explorer, and soldier of fortune
