= Henry Schultz (disambiguation) =

Henry Schultz (1893–1938) was an American economist, statistician, and one of the founders of econometrics.

Henry Schultz may also refer to:

- Henry A. Schultz (1844–1916), American politician from Maryland
- Henry J. Schultz (1910–2008), American politician, mayor of Easton, Pennsylvania
- Harry D. Schultz (1923–2023), American investment adviser and author
- Henry Shultz (1776–1851), entrepreneur in Northern Germany and the American South
- Henry Schultze (1893–1959), American academic and president of Calvin College

== See also ==
- Henry Schulte (1879–1944), American football player and multi-sport coach
