= Weiskittel family =

Historic Baltimore family who made iron stoves (1850–1962)

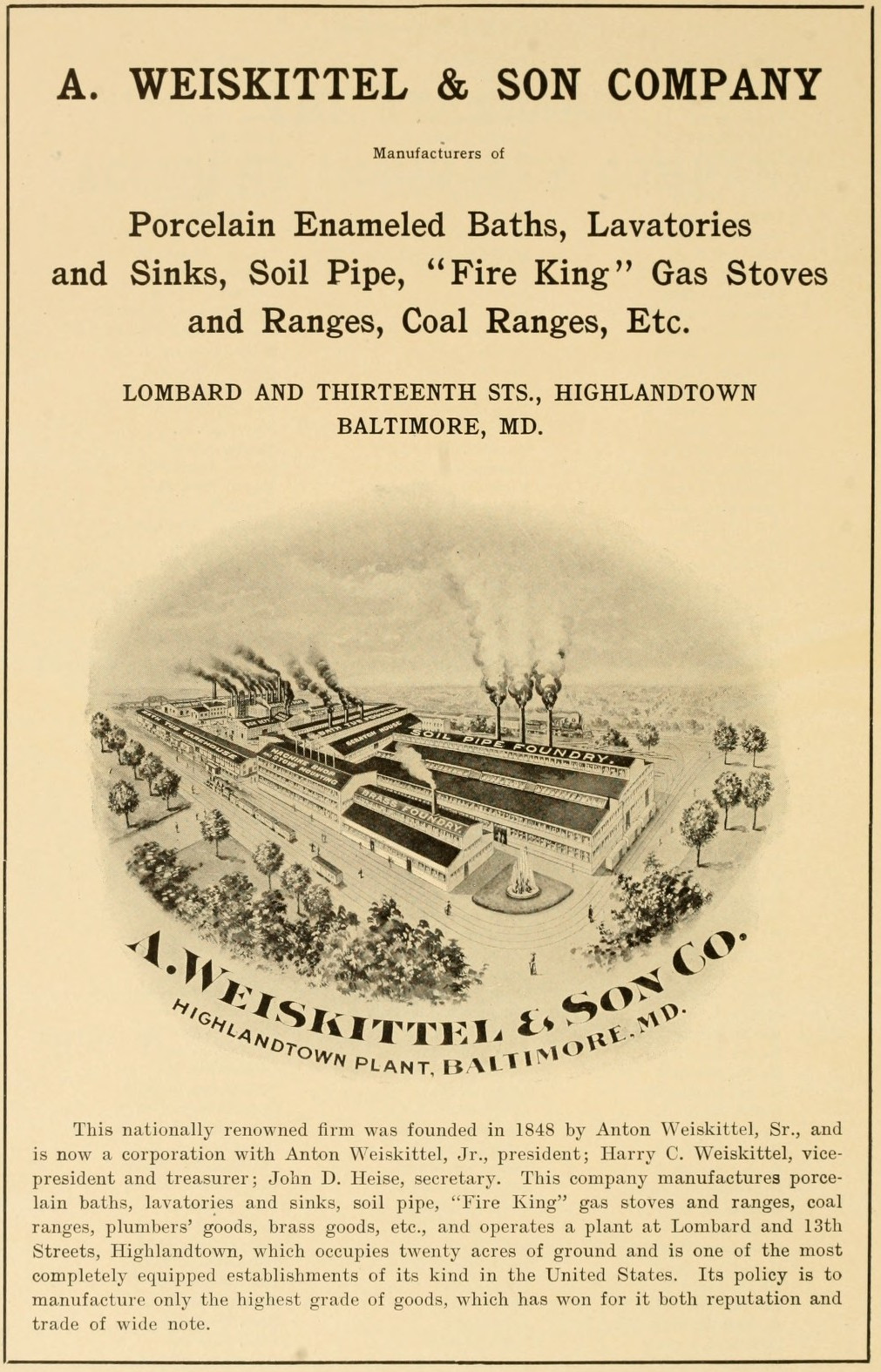
Advertisement dated 1910

The Weiskittel family were a once prominent German immigrant family in Baltimore, Maryland from about 1850 to 1962. They owned two iron foundries that were at one time the largest stove manufacturers in Baltimore. The companies, A. Weiskittel & Son and Harry C. Weiskittel Company employed thousands of workers over a 112-year period across three generations of Weiskittel owners. A family dispute in 1930 caused an acrimonious fork of the company along family lines, followed by a series of sudden deaths that disrupted the generational succession. By 1962, both companies had been dissolved or sold. The family built a number of historic structures including the Weiskittel-Roehle Burial Vault in Loudon Park Cemetery, and the Weiskittel House in Fells Point, both included in the National Register of Historic Places.

== History ==
=== Anton Weiskittel ===
Anton Weiskittel (1825–1884) was born in Dassel, in the province of Hanover, Germany, and emigrated to the United States during the revolutions of 1848. After running a plumbing business for two years in Washington, D.C., he moved to Baltimore, Maryland in 1850, and opened an iron foundry that would become A. Weiskittel & Son. The family had previously been in the stove manufacturing business in Germany. A. Weiskittel & Son was located at the corner of Aliceanna and Washington Streets in Fells Point and grew to become one of the most significant foundries in the city. The company manufactured porcelain baths, sinks, 'Fire King' branded gas stoves, plumbing supplies, coal ranges, and brass goods. During the Civil War, they supplied the government with stoves and heaters.

Anton Weiskittel married Margaret Shoemaker of Baltimore, and they had two sons, Anton Jr. (1859–1925) and Harry C. (1868–1943), and a daughter, Mathilda (1854–1942). Weiskittel was an active member of Baltimore's German-American community. He belonged to the Zion Lutheran Church in the German enclave of Jonestown, was a founding director of the German Fire Insurance Company of Baltimore in 1865, and was an incorporator of the German Bank in 1868. In 1873, he built the fashionable Italianate-style Weiskittel House at 1931 East Pratt Street. Ornamented with a wealth of cast-iron elements, it is a designated notable building in the Butchers Hill Historic District survey. The Weiskittel House has been compared to the Bankard-Gunther Mansion located four blocks north, itself noted as the grandest house in Butchers Hill.

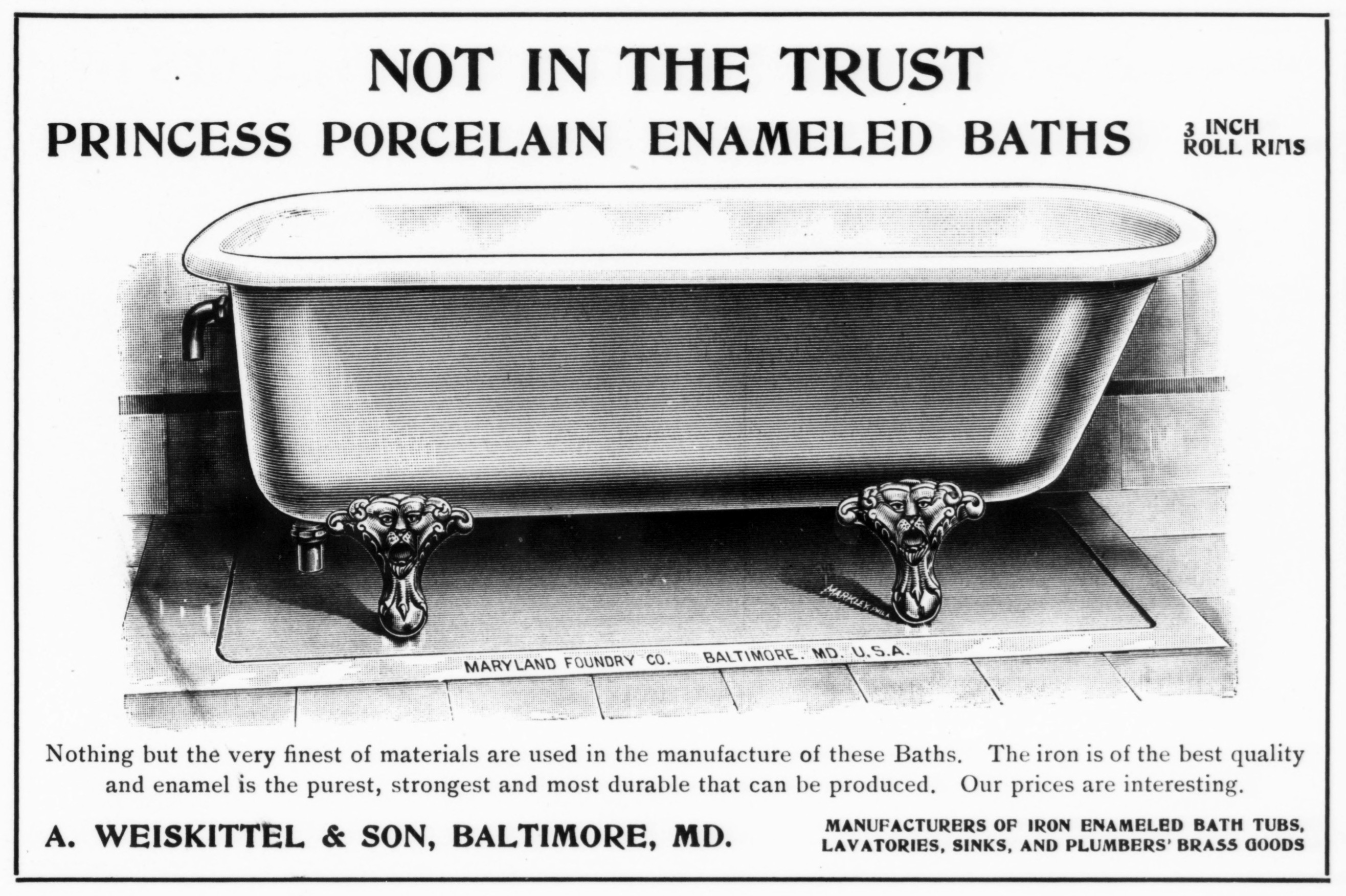
In advertisements for his company's bathtubs, Anton Jr. once featured a pun about a "Bathtub Trust." The joke turned serious a decade later when he was convicted of criminal conspiracy for his involvement in the illegal trust.

Anton Weiskittel died suddenly of a cerebral hemorrhage on April 18, 1884. At the time his eldest son, Anton Jr., was a partner in the business, while his youngest son, Harry, was fifteen years old. He was buried in Loudon Park Cemetery, where Masonic rites were performed. The Weiskittel-Roehle Burial Vault is a rectangular structure built into a hill, and unusually is made of cast iron from the Weiskittel foundry. It was designed and painted to appear to be made of stone. The vault features a pair of iron doors with a curvilinear leaf motif. Others interred in the vault are Anton Weiskittel's wife, Margaret Weiskittel (d. 1912), his son Anton W. Weiskittel (d. 1925), his son-in-law Louis L. Roehle (d. 1907), and Louis' daughter Martha W. Roehle (d. 1912).

=== Anton Weiskittel Jr. ===
After his father's death, Anton Weiskittel Jr. took charge of the company, and his brother, Harry C. Weiskittel, later joined the firm. Around 1898, the company began constructing a new plant in Highlandtown (4500 E. Lombard St). By 1910, the plant had expanded to over 10 acres, and the original Fells Point location was closed.

Around 1910, A. Weiskittel & Son Co. was charged in a federal antitrust lawsuit. The company was colluding with a group of similar manufacturers, known as the "Bathtub Trust", which the government sued for restraint of trade such as price fixing etc. The nation-wide suit against dozens of companies started in Baltimore, and in November 1911, the U.S. Circuit Court ordered the trust to be dissolved. A subsequent criminal case was brought in Detroit, and in February 1913, Anton Weiskittel Jr., was found guilty of criminal conspiracy to restrain trade.

By the 1920s, it had become the largest stove manufacturer in Baltimore with over 600 employees. The company was at its peak when Anton Weiskittel Jr. died suddenly on February 6, 1925. His brother Harry C. Weiskittel took over the company.

=== Harry C. Weiskittel ===
Harry C. c. 1943

Following the death of Anton Jr., the third generation fought for control of the company. In September 1930, Anton Jr's sons, Herbert L. (1896–1980) and Francis A. Weiskittel (1898–1994), filed a suit asking the court to appoint a receiver for the company. The suit was made against their uncle, Harry C. Weiskittel (son of the founder), who was then president, and his sons. They alleged that since the death of their father in 1925, the business had been "more and more nearly without management at all." Herbert L. was also involved in other legal entanglements, including being arrested in August 1930 for breaking into the home of his first wife; and a separate $100,000 suit filed against him for breach of promise to marry another woman.

As a result of the family disputes, Harry C. severed connections with the original company, A. Weiskittel & Son. In 1930–1931, he and his two sons, Anton K. (1895–1953) and Harry Jr. (1897–1959), established the Harry C. Weiskittel Company at a new twenty-five-acre foundry located at 4901 Philadelphia Road (now Pulaski Highway and I-95). After his uncle's departure, Herbert L. took over A. Weiskittel & Son in 1930. Concerned about competition, Herbert L. sued his uncle in 1932 for trademark infringement over the use of the "Weiskittel" name (A. Weiskittel & Son vs. Harry C. Weiskittel Company). The court sided with Harry C., ruling he had the right to use his own name. A. Weiskittel & Son did not last long under Herbert L.'s leadership, it was dissolved by 1939. The former factory at E. Lombard was used by a succession of manufacturing and lumber companies, as of 2025 it is a large open lot with no buildings remaining.

Meanwhile, Harry C.'s new company thrived through the 1930s, the war years, and the post-war economic boom, producing materials for World War II, including sheet-metal fabrications and iron castings. Following Harry C.'s death in 1943 at age 74, his son Anton K. became president. After Anton K. died suddenly in 1953 at age 57, his younger brother Harry Jr. took over. Harry Jr. also died suddenly in 1959 at age 61. His wife, Anna Weiskittel (1903–1988), then became president. In October 1962, Anna Weiskittel sold the company to the Baltimore scrap metal firm H. Klaff & Co. Around 1964, Klaff sold a controlling interest to Glamorgan Pipe & Foundry Co. of Virginia, which renamed it the Weiskittel Pipe & Foundry Co. and operated it as a Baltimore division. The new entity was unprofitable like many mills at the time due to cheap foreign competition, and closed sometime before 1972. The site was subsequently used by the National Lumber Company.

== Gallery ==
Weiskittels in Baltimore
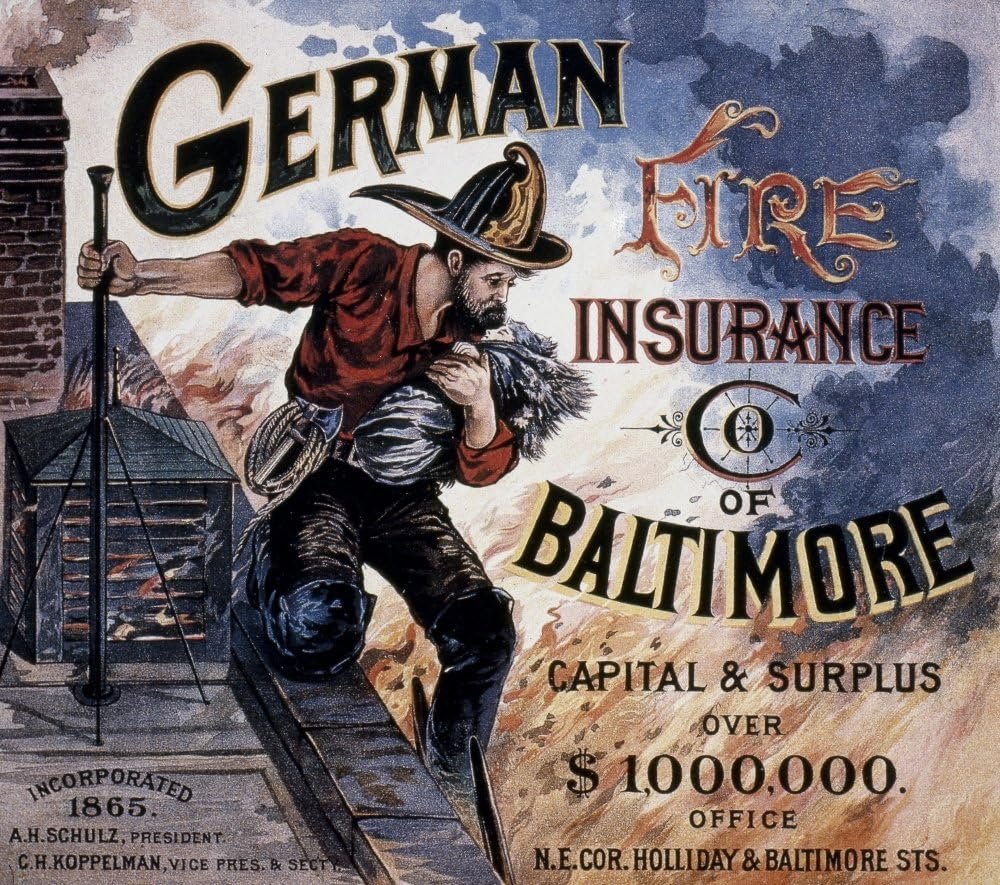
Anton Weiskittel, Sr., was a founding director of the German Fire Insurance Company of Baltimore in 1865

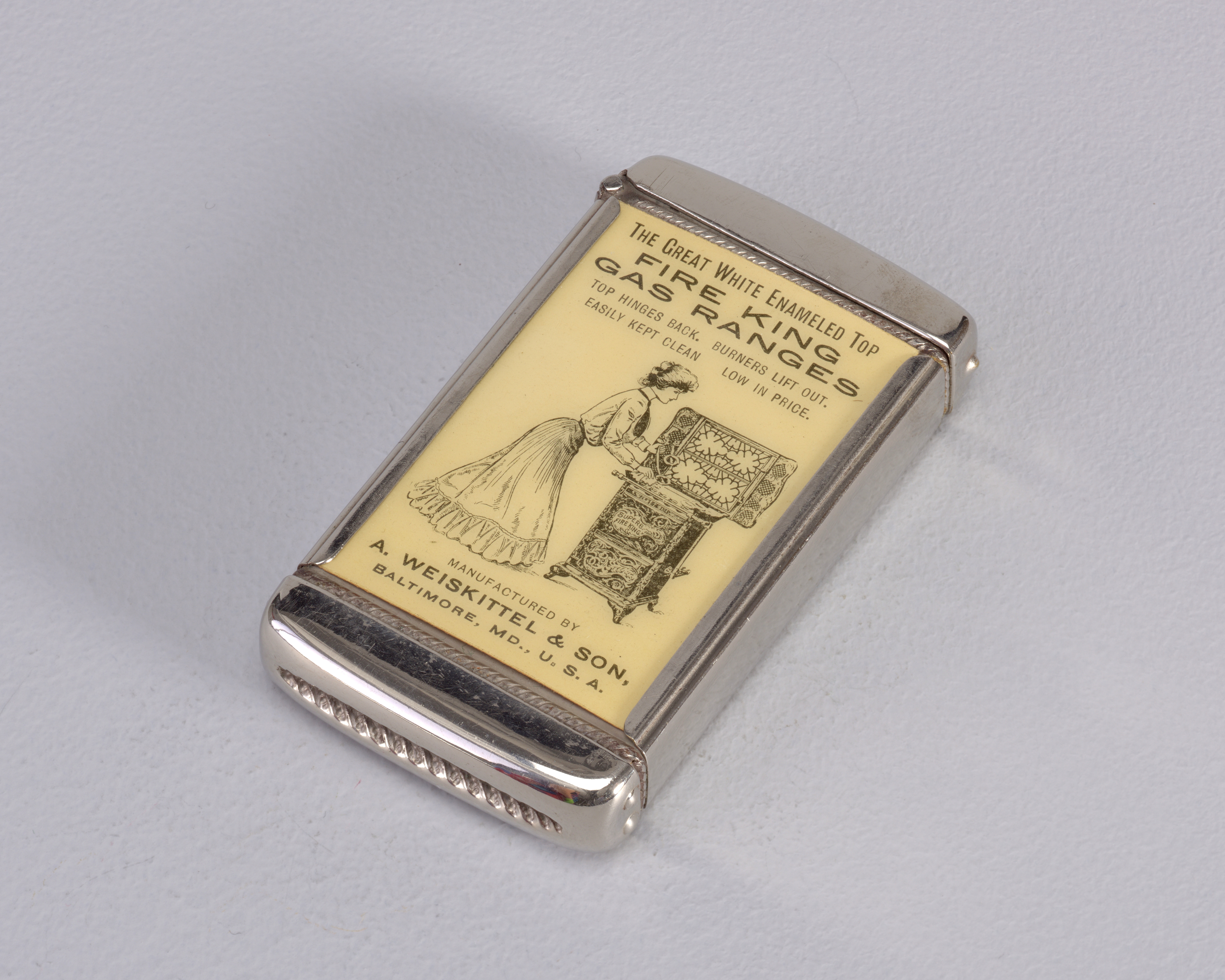
Vesta case with advertisement for "Fire King Gas Ranges" (1900-1910)

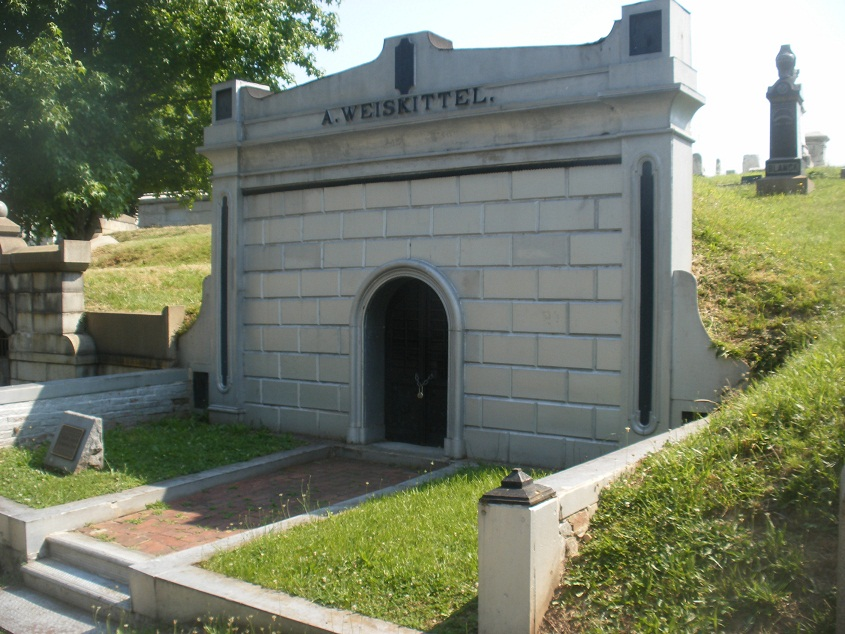
Weiskittel iron burial vault at Louden Park Cemetery

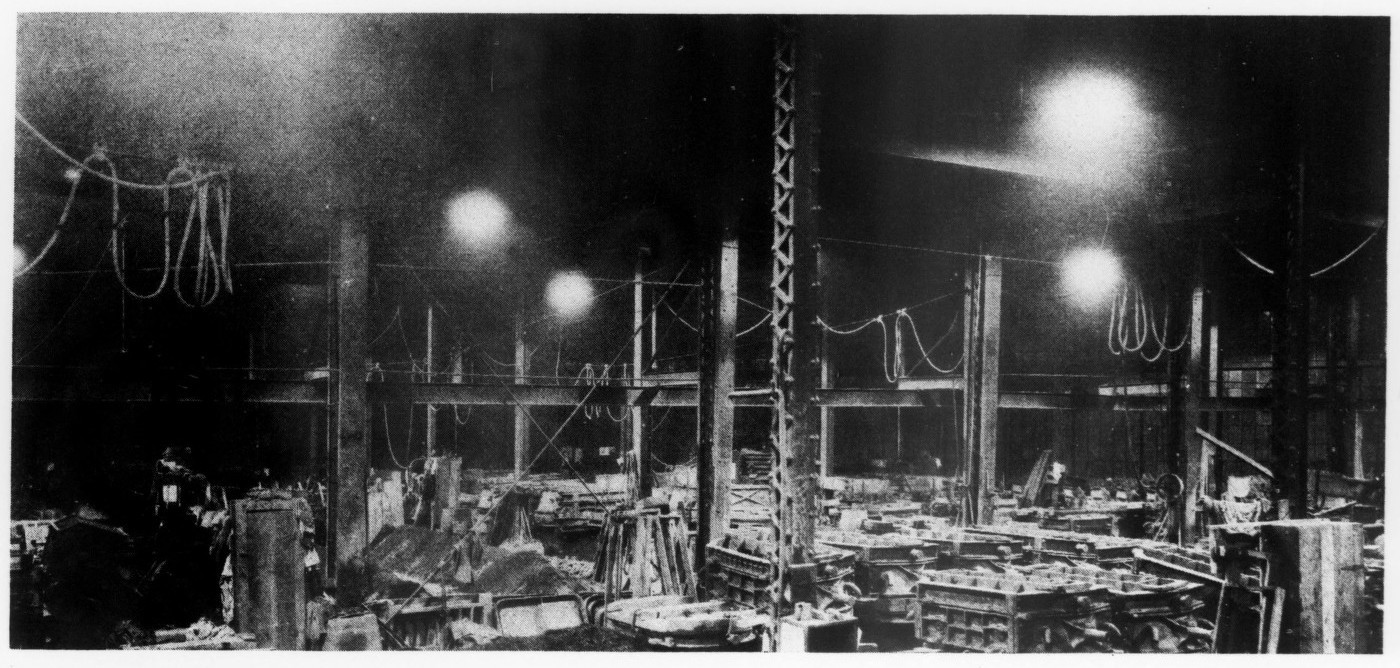
A Weiskittel & Son factory floor lit up by powerful electric lights in about 1929.

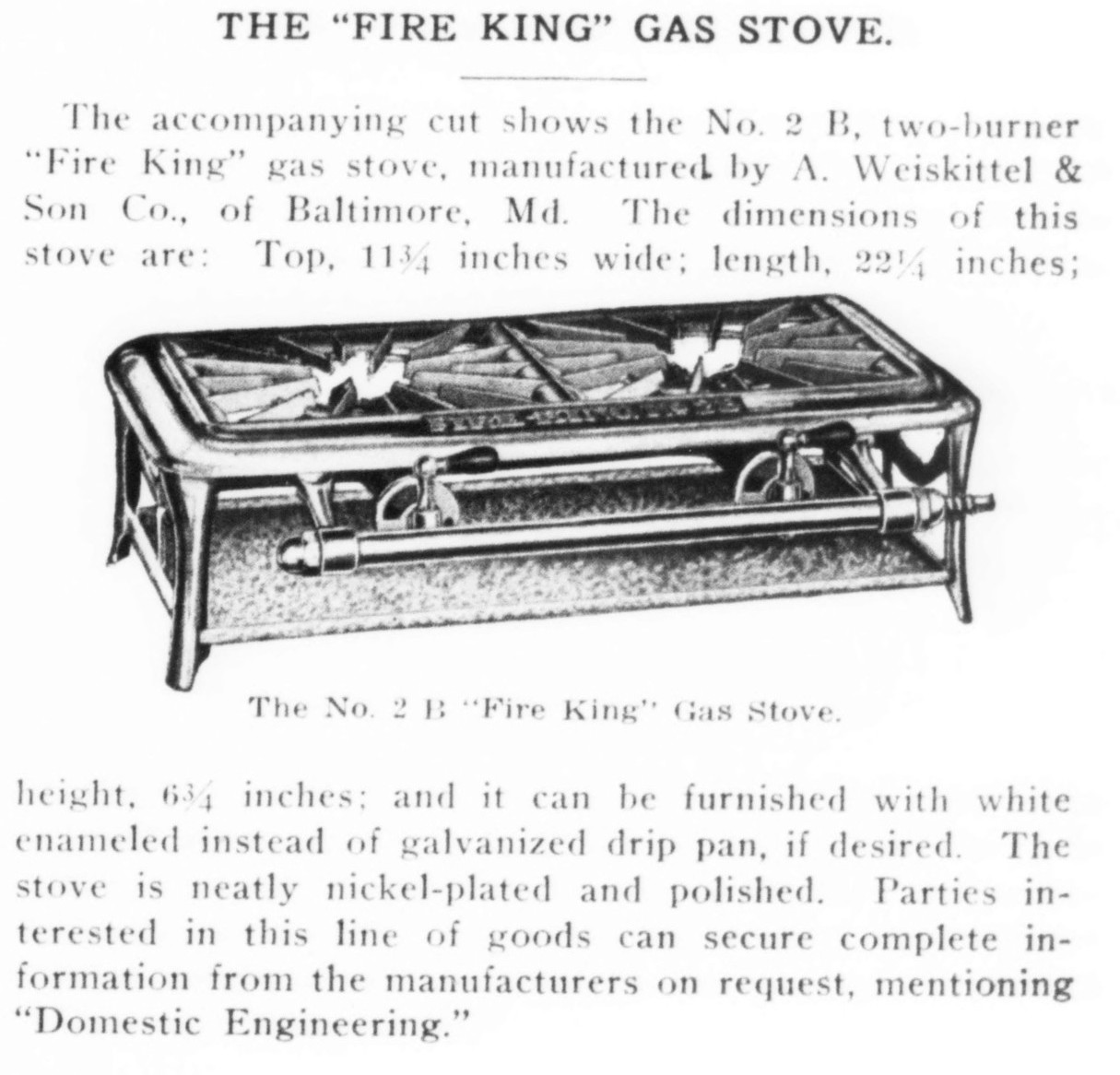
The company-branded "Fire King 2B" two burner gas stove in 1915

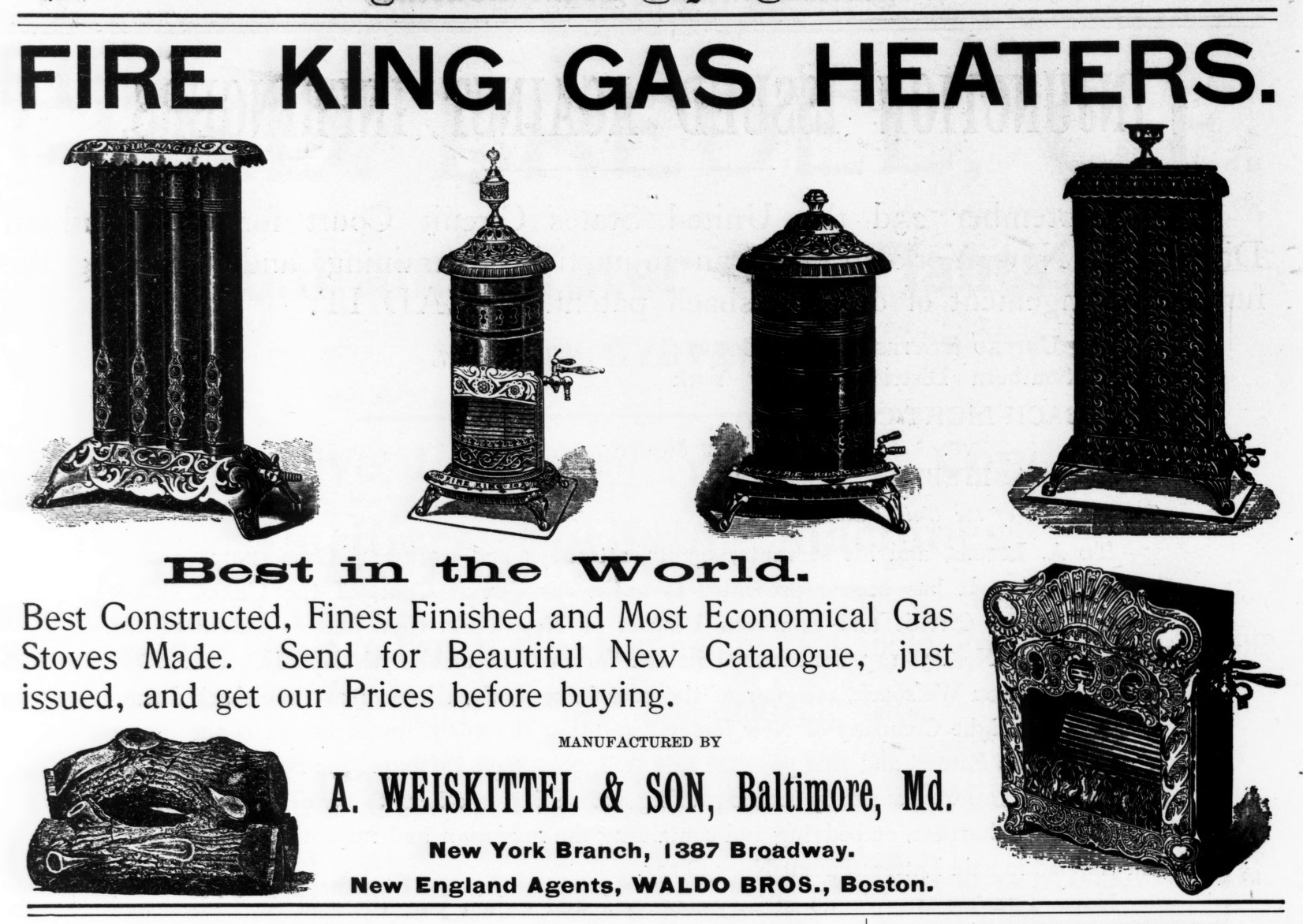
"Fire King" gas heater product line in 1896
