= Bathtub Trust =

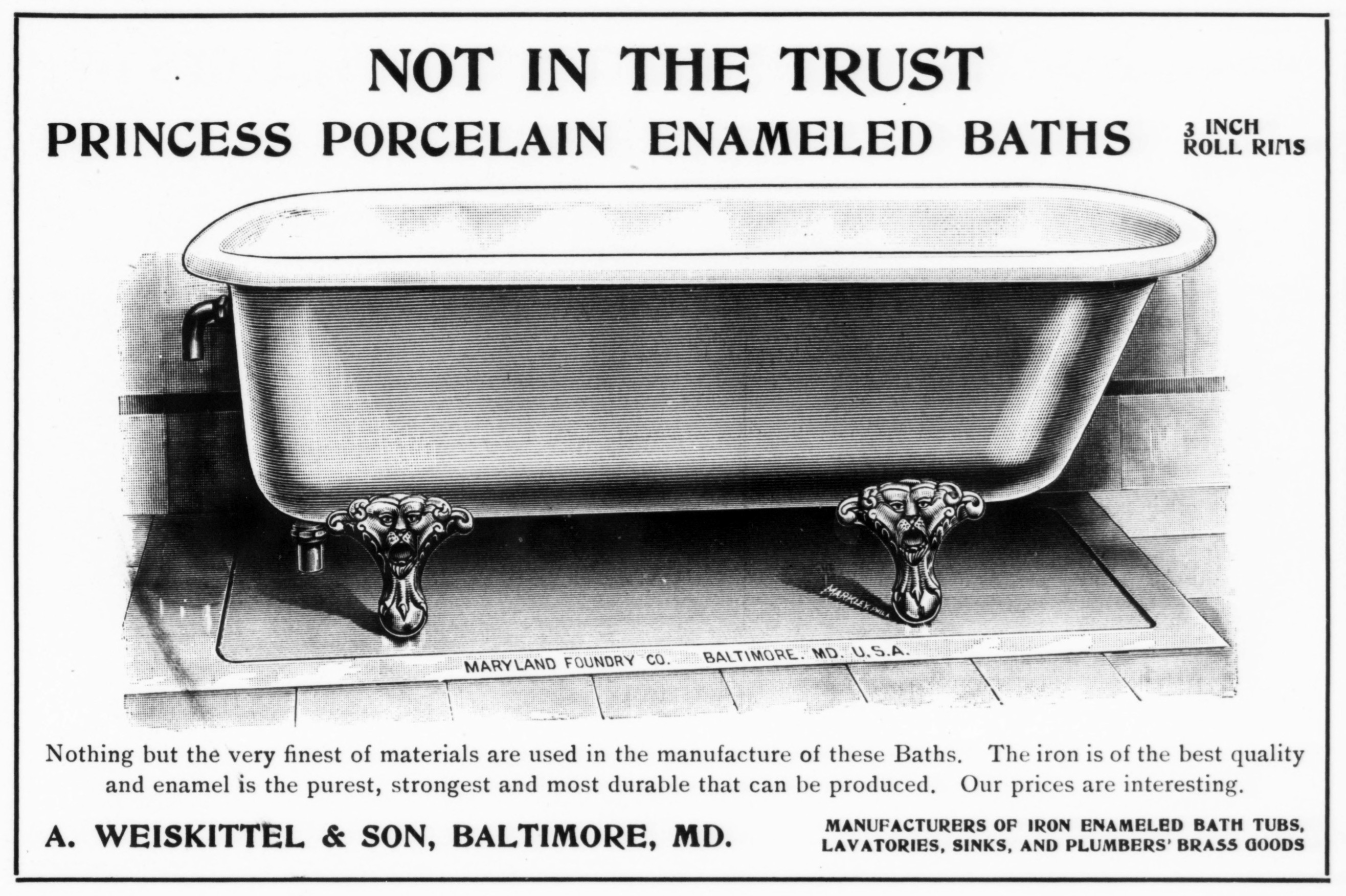
Advertisements for Baltimore-based A. Weiskittel & Son bathtubs once featured a pun about a trust. The joke turned serious later when Mr. Weiskittel was convicted of criminal conspiracy for his involvement in the illegal trust. The suite against the trust began in Baltimore.

The Bathtub Trust was when the Standard Sanitary Manufacturing Company and forty-nine other companies were charged with engaging in anti-competitive practices (price fixing etc). The trust had been around in some form or another since at least the turn of the century. A suite was filed against them, at the urging of President William Howard Taft, that began in Baltimore. It reached the Supreme Court of the United States as Standard Sanitary Mfg. Co. v. United States and the trust was broken. Joseph R. Darling was a special agent of the United States Department of Justice who prepared the case. In 1915 he wrote "Darling on Trusts" a legal treatise.

A subsequent criminal case was brought in Detroit, and in February 1913, members of the now-broken trust were found guilty of criminal conspiracy to restrain trade.
