= Abel G. Cadwallader =

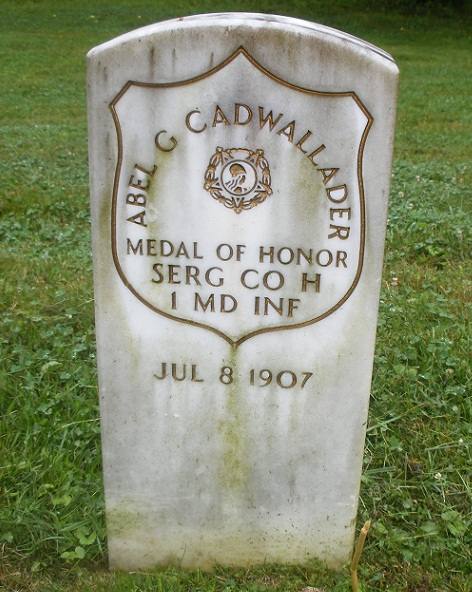
- Gravestone in Loudon Park Cemetery
- Born: 1841; Baltimore, Maryland
- Died: July 6, 1907 (aged 65–66)
- Burial place: Loudon Park Cemetery, Baltimore, Maryland
- Military career
- Allegiance: United States
- Branch: United States Army
- Service years: 1861 - 1865
- Rank: Sergeant
- Unit: 1st Maryland Infantry Regiment
- Conflicts: American Civil War • Battle of Hatcher's Run
- Awards: Medal of Honor

Abel G. Cadwallader (1841 – July 6, 1907) was a Union Army soldier in the American Civil War who received the U.S. military's highest decoration, the Medal of Honor, for his actions at the Battle of Hatcher's Run.

Born in 1841 in Baltimore, Maryland, Cadwallader was living in Frederick, Maryland when he enlisted in the Army in May 1861. He served as a corporal in Company H of the 1st Maryland Infantry Regiment. During the Battle of Hatcher's Run in Virginia on February 6, 1865, Cadwallader "[g]allantly planted the colors on the enemy's works in advance of the arrival of his regiment." For this action, he was issued the Medal of Honor several decades later, on January 5, 1897.

Cadwallader reached the rank of sergeant before leaving the army in July 1865. He died on July 6, 1907, and was buried at Loudon Park Cemetery in Baltimore.
