= J. Smith Orrick =

American politician (died 1930)

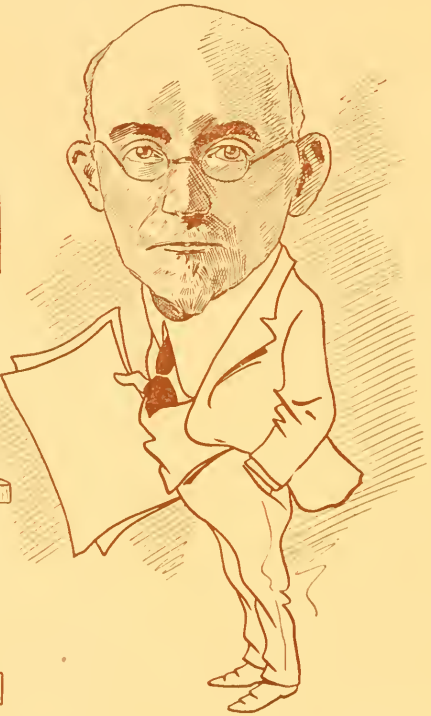
- Caricature of Orrick in 1916 publication

Member of the Maryland House of Delegates from the Baltimore County district
- In office 1892–1892 Serving with Craven M. Cole, William Elliott, James Hamilton Jr., Joseph C. Monmonier, Charles Schlaffer

Personal details
- Born: c. 1860 Baltimore, Maryland, U.S.
- Died: February 26, 1930
- Resting place: Loudon Park Cemetery; Baltimore, Maryland, U.S.
- Party: Democratic
- Spouse: Nannie Hilten
- Children: 2
- Education: Western Maryland College; Dickinson College
- Occupation: Politician

J. Smith Orrick (c. 1860 – February 26, 1930) was an American politician from Maryland. He served as a member of the Maryland House of Delegates, representing Baltimore County in 1892.

== Early life ==
J. Smith Orrick was born around 1860 in Baltimore to John C. Orrick. Orrick was educated at Lambs' School (later Friends School). He was educated at Western Maryland College and Dickinson College.

== Career ==
Orrick was a Democrat. He served as a member of the Maryland House of Delegates, representing Baltimore County in 1892.

Orrick was magistrate of Glyndon, Maryland, for 35 years. He also served as president of the Glyndon Building Association.

== Personal life ==
Orrick married Nannie Hilten. He had two sons, S. Hilton and Frank C. His son S. Hilton was the assistant minister of Old St. Paul's Protestant Episcopal Church.

Orrick died on February 26, 1930. He was buried at Loudon Park Cemetery in Baltimore.
