= Alpheus Waters Wilson =

American bishop of the Methodist Episcopal Church, South (1834–1916)

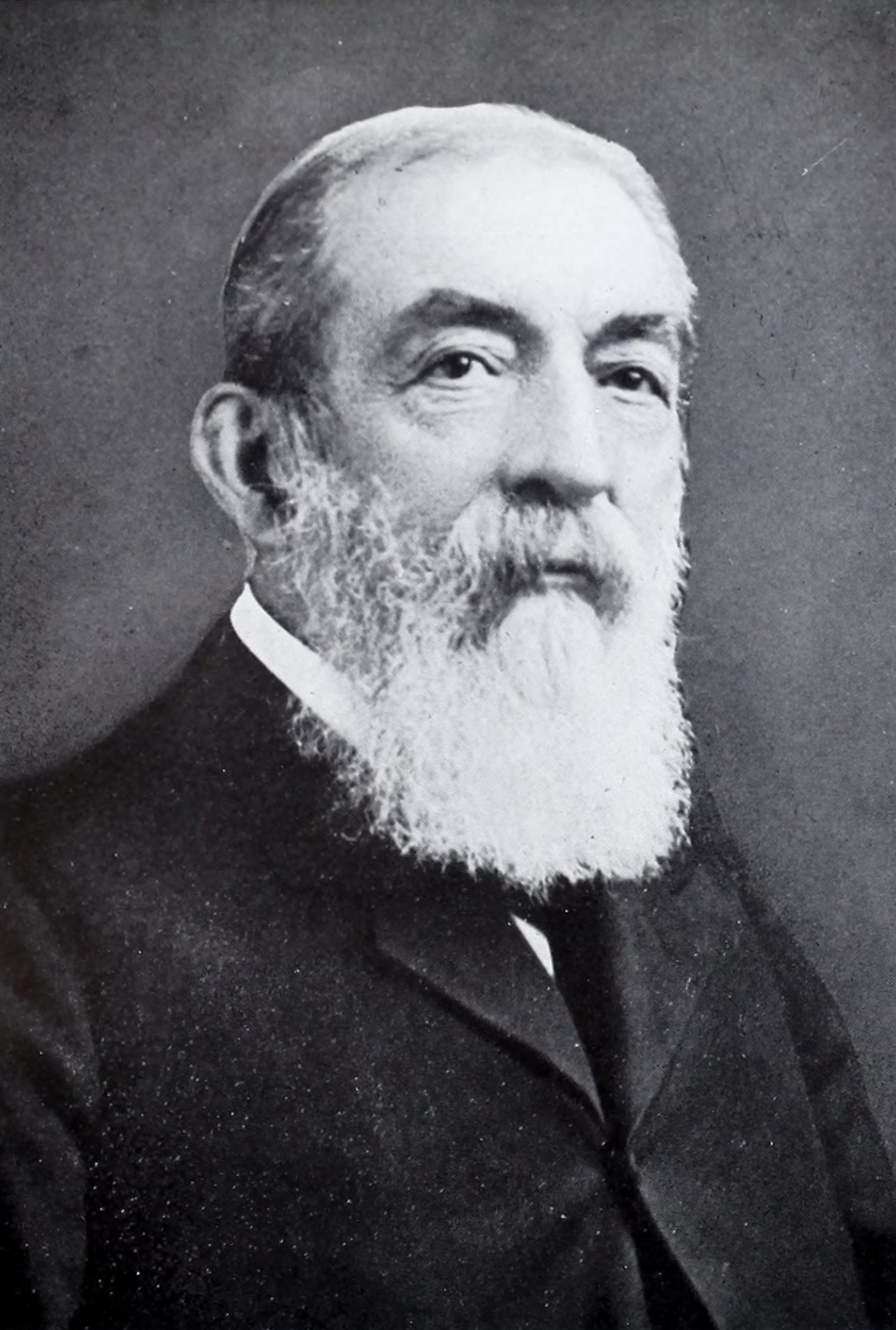
- Wilson in 1914 publication
- Born: February 5, 1834; Baltimore, Maryland, U.S.
- Died: November 21, 1916 (aged 82); Baltimore, Maryland, U.S.
- Resting place: Loudon Park Cemetery; Baltimore, Maryland, U.S.
- Education: Columbian University
- Occupation: Clergyman
- Spouse: Susan B. Lipscomb (m. 1857; died 1908)
- Children: 3

Alpheus Waters Wilson (February 5, 1834 – November 21, 1916) was an American bishop for the Methodist Episcopal Church, South from 1882 to his death in 1916.

== Early life ==
Alpheus Waters Wilson was born on February 5, 1834, in Baltimore, Maryland, to Cornelia Laurence (née Howland) and Norval Wilson. His father was a preacher and elder of the Methodist Church. Wilson attended public schools in Baltimore and graduated from Columbian University (later George Washington University).

== Career ==
In 1853, Wilson was received on trial in Baltimore Conference Methodist Episcopal Church. He served four years as junior preacher and two years as pastor of circuits. From 1859 to 1870, Wilson was a supernumerary member of the conference. He practiced law sometime during this period. Around 1866, Wilson and the Baltimore Conference moved to the Methodist Episcopal Church, South. He founded Trinity Church, the first Southern Methodist church in Baltimore. From 1870 to 1873, Wilson was presiding elder of the Washington District. From 1873 to 1877, he was pastor of Mount Vernon Place Church in Washington City. He was a pastor of Calvary Church in Baltimore from March 1877 to May 1878. In 1878, Wilson was made secretary of the board of missions and in 1882, he was consecrated as a bishop. From 1898 to his death, Wilson was senior bishop, succeeding Bishop John Christian Keener. He also served as president of the board of missions and chairman of the College of Bishops.

In 1886, 1888 and 1890, he took bishop tours around the world. He traveled to Japan, Korea and China in 1898–1900 and 1907. He was a delegate to the ecumenical conference in London in 1881 and 1901. He was also a delegate to the ecumenical conference in Washington, D.C., in 1891 and Toronto in 1911. Wilson visited Brazil on mission inspection from 1892 to 1903.

Wilson wrote religious articles and papers, including the book "Mission: Witnesses to Christ".

== Personal life ==
Wilson married Susan B. Lipscomb, daughter of a Methodist preacher, on March 4, 1857. His wife died in 1908. They had three daughters, Maybelle, Nina and Mrs. William L. Weber.

Wilson had asthma. He died from pneumonia and heart failure on November 21, 1916, at his home at 1600 Park Place in Baltimore. He was buried in Loudon Park Cemetery in Baltimore.
