= Weiskittel-Roehle Burial Vault =

Historic site in Baltimore, Maryland, US

- U.S. National Register of Historic Places
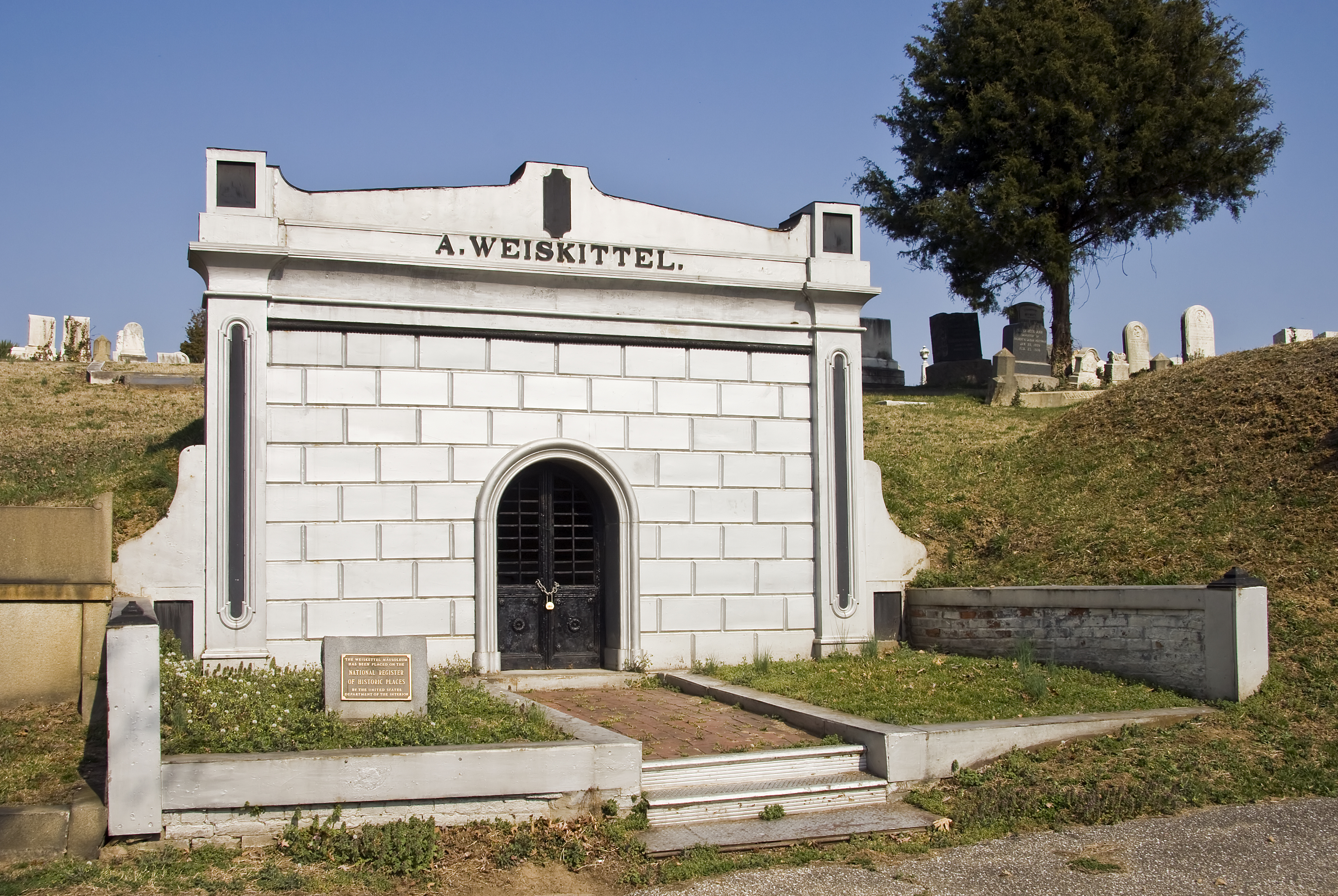
- Weiskittel-Roehle Burial Vault, March 2012

- Location within Baltimore Location within Maryland Location within the United States
- Location: Section P, Loudon Park Cemetery, Baltimore, Maryland
- Coordinates: 39°16′45″N 76°40′47″W
- Area: less than one acre
- Built: 1884
- Architect: A. Weiskittel & Son, Stove Foundry
- Architectural style: Late Victorian
- NRHP reference No.: 76002185
- Added to NRHP: May 19, 1976

Weiskittel-Roehle Burial Vault is a burial vault located in Section P, Loudon Park Cemetery, Baltimore, Maryland, constructed in 1884. It is a rectangular structure that looks like stone but, unusually, it is almost entirely constructed of cast iron. It is built into the side of a hill, molded and painted to look like ashlar masonry.

The Weiskittel family, some of whom are buried in the vault, ran a cast iron stove manufacturing company for 112 years, beginning in 1850. By the 1925, it was the largest such company in Baltimore employing over 600 workers. A family dispute in 1930 caused an acrimonious fork of the company along family lines, followed by a series of sudden deaths that disrupted the generational succession. By 1962 both companies were dissolved or sold, and the last person to use the vault died in 1925. It was listed on the National Register of Historic Places in 1976.
