= Richard H. Edmonds =

American businessman (1857–1930)

- Edmonds in 1920
- Born: October 11, 1857; Norfolk, Virginia, U.S.
- Died: October 4, 1930 (aged 72); Baltimore, Maryland, U.S.
- Burial place: Loudon Park Cemetery, Baltimore, Maryland, U.S.
- Occupation: Businessman
- Known for: Establishing the Manufacturers' Record

Richard Hathaway Edmonds (October 11, 1857 – October 4, 1930) was a publisher and businessman based in Baltimore, Maryland. He established the Manufacturers' Record, a weekly engineering newspaper about the American South, in 1882. It was active for 72 years, before it merged with another newspaper. He was recognized in England as the "nestor of Southern industrial publicity."

== Early life ==
Edmonds was born in 1857 in Norfolk, Virginia, to Richard Henry Edmonds, a Baptist minister (1831–1858), and Mary Eliza Ashley (died in 1912). He had two known siblings: sister Mary Elizabeth (Bessie) and brother William. William married Anna Sylvester, with whom he had three children.

During the American Civil War, the family relocated to Kilmarnock, Virginia, then to Baltimore, Maryland, in 1871. After leaving school aged 17, Edmonds began working for Baltimore's Journal of Commerce as an errand runner, wrapper writer and mailing clerk. He later became a bookkeeper and a report. Four years into his time at the company, he was the journal's assistant editor. He also developed an interest in agriculture, and began writing for newspapers about the domestic and international grain trade.

== Career ==
In 1881, upon noticing a growing industrial trend in the American South, Edmonds approached the editor of the Journal of Commerce about introducing an industrial paper. It was decided that a feature could be added to the Journal, which was renamed the Journal of Commerce and Manufacturers' Record. Six months later, in early 1882, Edmonds split the two newspapers and established the standalone Manufacturers' Record, a weekly engineering newspaper about the Southern states. It was published on Thursdays. Edmonds's brother, William, became a partner shortly after the paper's establishment, but he died in 1898, aged 44.

The magazine's final issue was published in 1954, at which point it was merged with Industrial Development to become the Industrial Development and Manufacturers' Record. Edmonds sold his interest in the newspaper in 1929.

== Personal life ==
In 1881, Edmonds married Adelaide (Addie) L. Field. They lived at 323 Roland Avenue in Baltimore, initially, then number 4711. They summered in Dayton Beach, Florida.

He was a charter member of the American Iron and Steel Institute and a member of the American Association for the Advancement of Science in the American Academy of Political and Social Science (AAAS). He was also a trustee of the Southern Baptist Theological Seminary in Louisville, Kentucky, and a member of Baltimore Country Club.

== Death ==
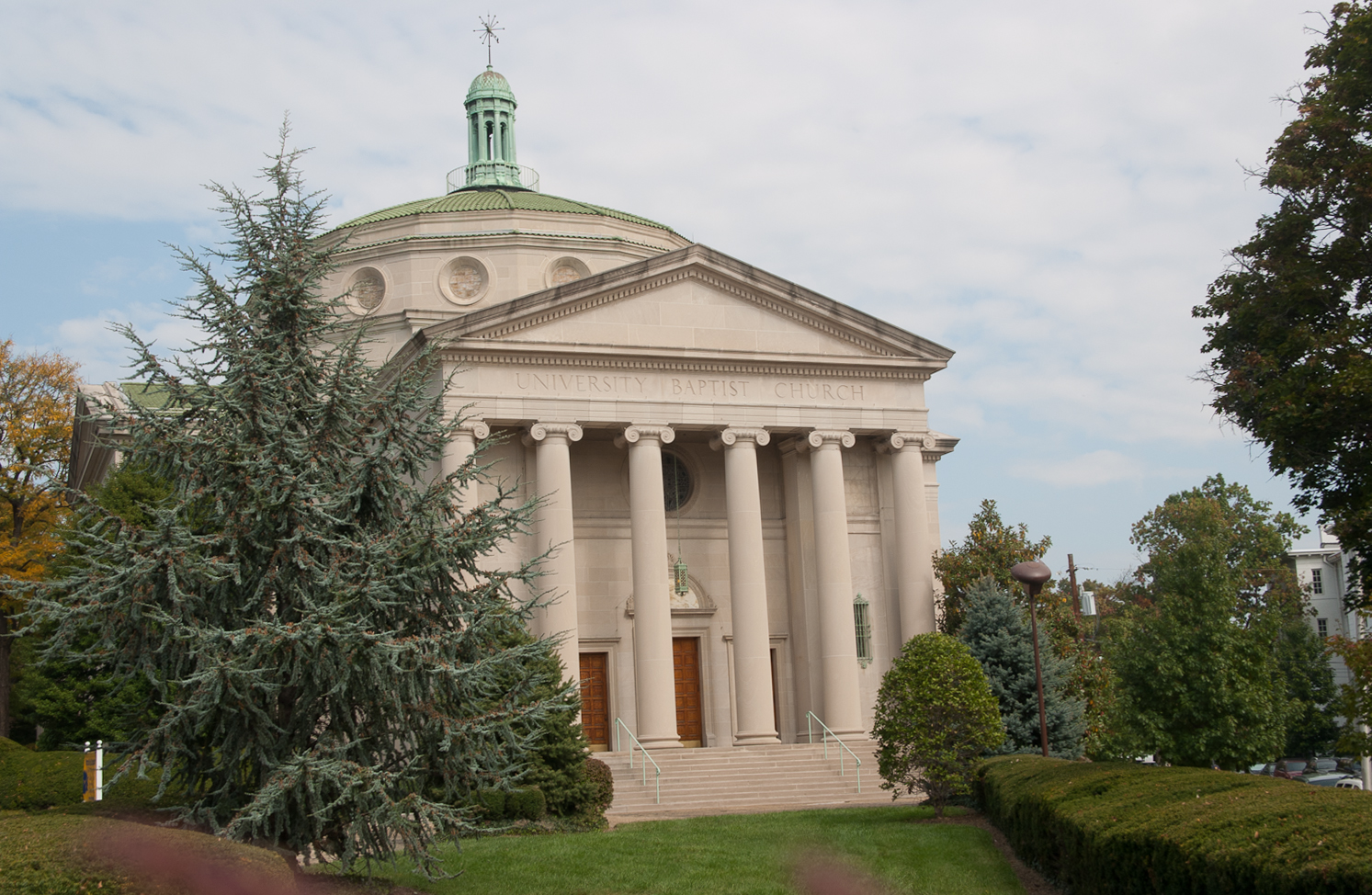
Edmonds's funeral took place at Baltimore's University Baptist Church.

Edmonds died in 1930, aged 72, shortly after a minor operation. He rallied after the 10.00 AM procedure, but around 2.00 PM he suffered a relapse. A funeral service was held at Baltimore's University Baptist Church (where he was a deacon), after which he was interred in the city's Loudon Park Cemtery. His widow was buried beside him upon her death two years later.
