= Thomas Y. Crowell =

American bookbinder and publisher

Thomas Young Crowell (1836–1915) was an American bookbinder and publisher, the founder of New York City book publishing company Thomas Y. Crowell Co. Crowell operated the bindery of Benjamin Bradley, deceased 1862, and acquired it in 1870. He started publishing in 1876. He had at least two sons: T. Irving Crowell, who joined the business in 1882, and Jeremiah Osborne Crowell, who was the sales manager in 1882. During his leadership of Thomas Y. Crowell Co., the company issued a profitable line of reference works and a variety of fictional titles also. He died in 1909 at the age of 73 and was succeeded by his son T. Irving Crowell (who was later succeeded by a third generation Robert L. Crowell).

Crowell published Edward Ingle's Southern Sidelight; a picture of Social and Economic Life in the South a Generation Before the War Thomas Y. Crowell & Co. (1896).
