= Loudon Park Cemetery =

Historic privately owned cemetery in Baltimore, Maryland

Loudon Park Funeral Home and Cemetery
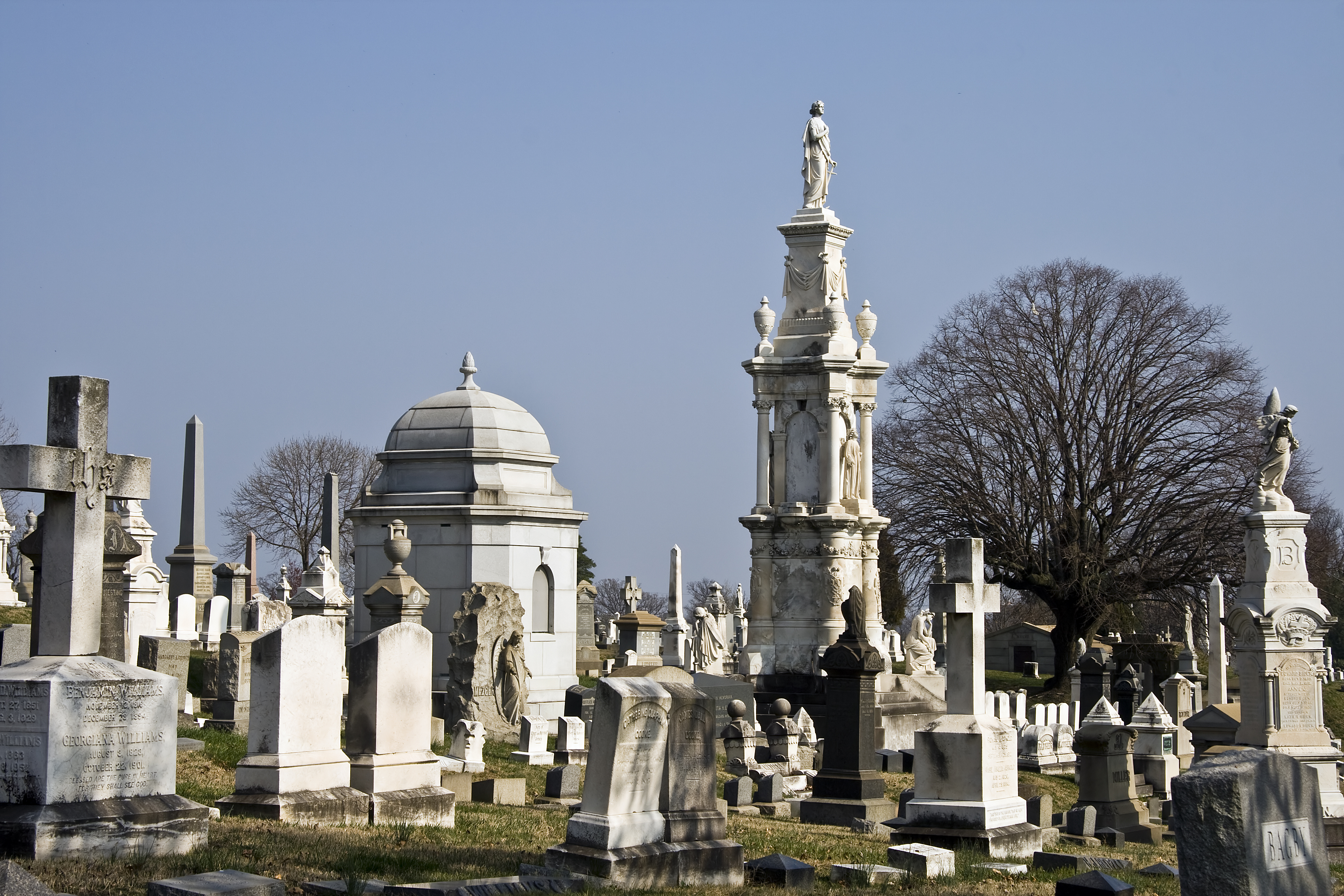
- The central portion of the cemetery
- Interactive map of Loudon Park Funeral Home and Cemetery

Details
- Established: 1853
- Location: 3620 Wilkens Ave., Baltimore, Maryland
- Country: United States
- Coordinates: 39°16′54″N 76°40′47″W
- Type: Public
- Owned by: Privately owned
- Size: 500-acre (202 ha)
- No. of interments: ~130,000
- Website: www.loudonparkcemetery.net

Loudon Park Cemetery is a historic cemetery in Baltimore, Maryland, United States. It was incorporated on January 27, 1853, on 100 acres (40 ha) of the site of the "Loudon" estate, previously owned by James Carey, a local merchant and politician. The entrance to the cemetery is located at 3620 Wilkens Avenue.

The cemetery and Loudon Park Funeral Home, Inc. are locally owned and operated. Both the cemetery and the funeral home became privately owned in 2014 when they were acquired from Service Corporation International (SCI). Loudon Park Funeral Home was built on the grounds of the historic cemetery by Stewart Enterprises in 1995. SCI acquired Stewart Enterprises in 2013.

== Loudon Park National Cemetery ==
A portion of the eastern section is owned by the federal government as Loudon Park National Cemetery, acquired in 1861, and holds the remains of 2,300 Union soldiers killed during the Civil War. There is also a Confederate section where about 650 Confederate soldiers are buried, marked by a statue of a Confederate soldier. Since 2003, nearly all of the Confederates in this section have had new markers put on their graves under an "Adopt-a-Confederate" program. The entrance to the National Cemetery portion of Loudon Park is located along Frederick Avenue in the neighborhood of Irvington.

The Confederate Memorial was designed by Frederick Volck in 1870, paid for by Loudon Park Confederate Memorial Association and inaugurated on June 17, 1873. The statue originally features a Confederate soldier (sometimes mistakenly thought to be Stonewall Jackson) standing above a pair of young children; but the children were removed from the statue sometime between 1924 and 1980.

== Notable persons ==
Notable persons interred here include:

- Charles J. Baker (1821–1894), ex officio Mayor of Baltimore
- Thomas Beck (1909–1995), actor
- Charles Joseph Bonaparte (1851–1921), former United States Attorney General, former United States Secretary of the Navy, founder of the Federal Bureau of Investigation.
- Jerome Napoleon Bonaparte (1805–1870), son of Jérôme Bonaparte, nephew of Emperor Napoleon I, father of Charles Joseph Bonaparte.
- William Samuel Booze (1862–1933, U.S. Congressman from Maryland's 3rd District, 1897–1899
- Abel G. Cadwallader (1841–1907), Civil War Medal of Honor recipient.
- Charles L. Carson (1847–1891), architect
- Jack L. Chalker (1944–2005), author
- Clarence Lemuel "Cupid" Childs (1867–1912), Major League Baseball Player.
- Barnes Compton (1830–1898), former Congressman and Maryland state Treasurer.
- Frederick Nicholls Crouch (1808–1896), composer.
- Elijah Cummings (1951–2019), U.S Congressman from Maryland's 7th district, 1996–2019.
- Frederick George D'Utassy (1827–1892), Civil War Union Army officer
- David Danforth (1890–1970), Major League Baseball player
- James William Denny (1838–1923), Civil War Confederate Army officer and U.S. Congressman for Maryland's 3rd District, 1899–1901 and 1903–1905
- Lewis Pessano "Buttercup" Dickerson (1858–1920), Major League Baseball player
- Richard H. Edmonds (1857–1930), publisher
- Charles W. Field (1828–1892), military officer in the United States, Confederate and Egyptian armies
- John T. Ford (1829–1894), operator of Ford's Theater
- James Albert Gary (1833–1920), 38th United States Postmaster General
- Harry Gilmor (1838–1883), Confederate cavalry officer and Baltimore City Police Commissioner.
- William Henry Gorman (1843–1915), cofounder of Citizens Bank of Maryland
- Hart Benton Holton (1835–1907), member of the U.S. House of Representatives and Maryland Senate
- Bradley Tyler Johnson (1829–1903), Writer, Confederate Brigadier General, commanded the 1st Maryland Regiment (C.S.A.).
- William Kimmel (1812–1886), U.S. Congressman for Maryland's 3rd District, 1877–1881.
- Frederic Arnold Kummer (1873–1943), American author, playwright and screenwriter
- T. Leigh Marriott (1871–1941), state delegate
- William W. McIntire (1850–1912), U.S. Congressman for Maryland's 3rd District, 1897–1899.
- H. L. Mencken (1880–1956), journalist, critic, author, and essayist.
- Ottmar Mergenthaler (1854–1899), inventor of the Linotype.
- Howard S. O'Neill (1883–1966), state senator and lawyer
- J. Smith Orrick (died 1930), American politician
- George W. Padgett (1858–1916), Maryland state delegate and Baltimore sheriff
- W. Harry Pairo (died 1925), member of the Maryland House of Delegates
- Mary Young Pickersgill (1776–1857), seamstress who made the flag flying over Fort McHenry during the Battle of Baltimore, inspiring Francis Scott Key to write "The Star-Spangled Banner".
- Robert John Reynolds (1838–1909), former governor of Delaware.
- Henry A. Schultz (1844–1916), Maryland state delegate
- Samuel J. Seymour (1860–1956), possible last surviving witness to the assassination of Abraham Lincoln.
- Frank S. Strobridge (1857–1918), American politician and insurance businessman
- Alpheus Waters Wilson (1834–1916), bishop of the American Methodist Episcopal Church, South

The Weiskittel-Roehle Burial Vault, faced with cast iron, was listed on the National Register of Historic Places in 1976.

== Images ==
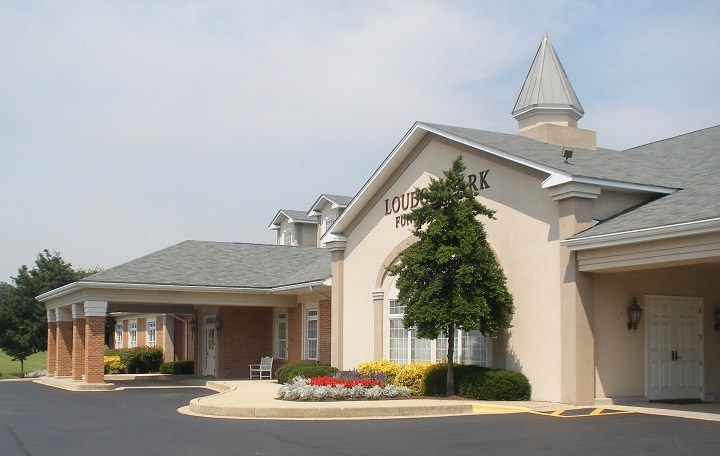
Funeral home, Wilkens Avenue

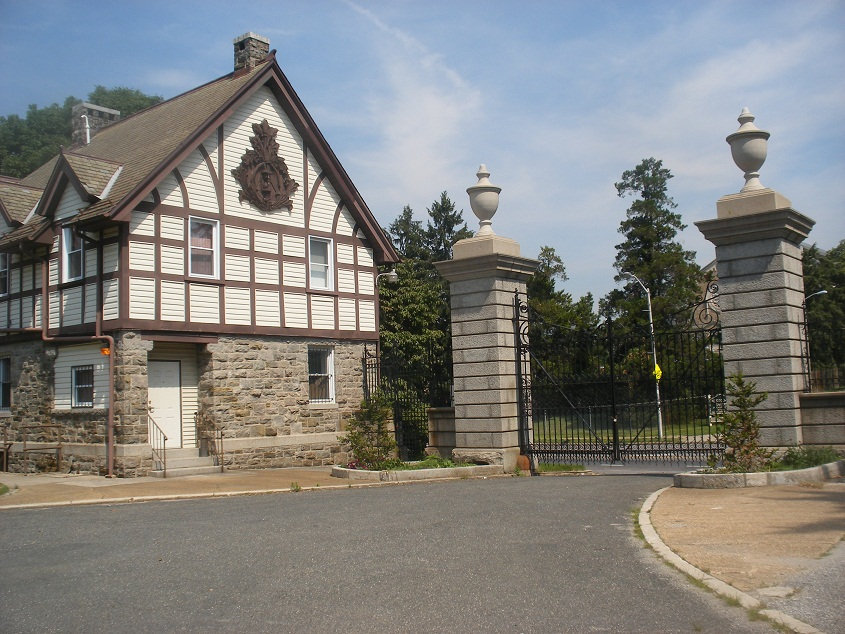
Original main gate and office, Frederick Avenue

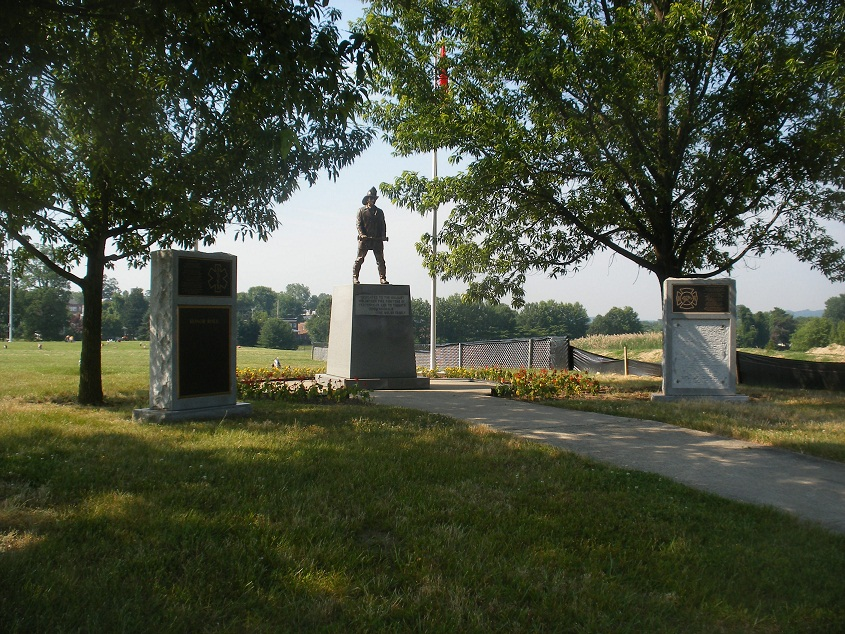
Firefighters memorial

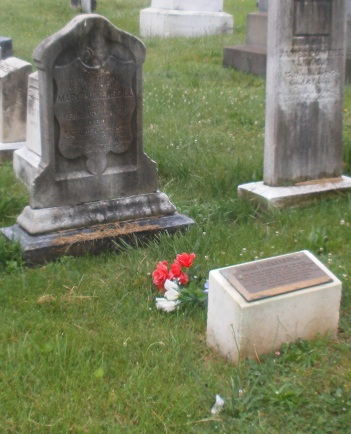
Mary Pickersgill tombstone and plaque

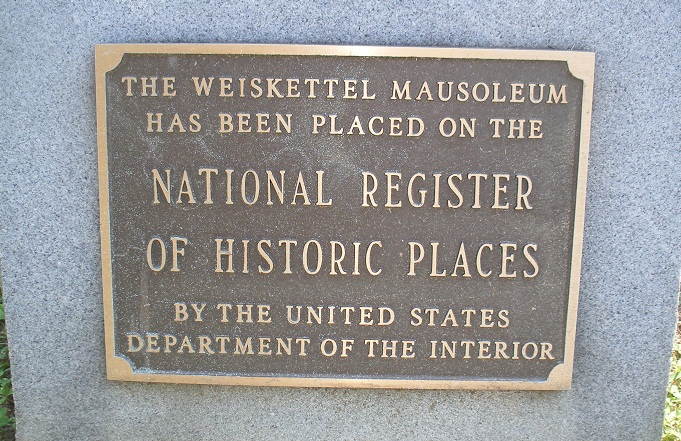
NRHP plaque for Weiskittel Mausoleum

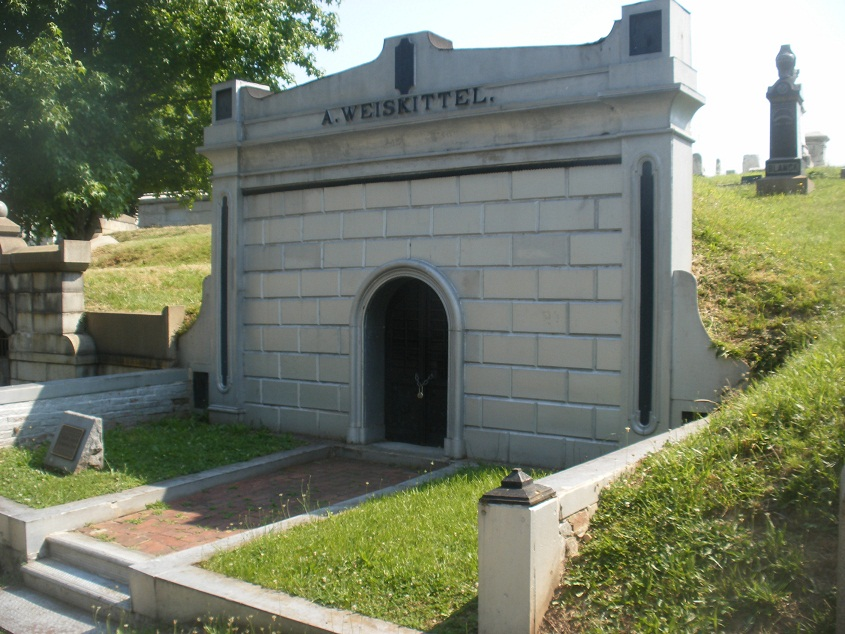
Weiskittel Mausoleum, made of cast iron to look like masonry

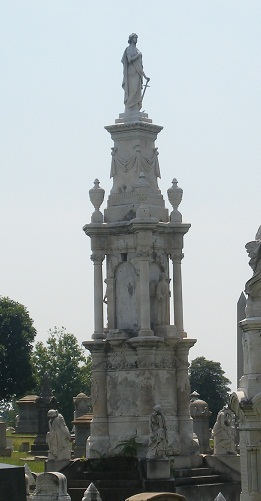
Wiessner Monument, more than three stories high, the tallest monument in the cemetery

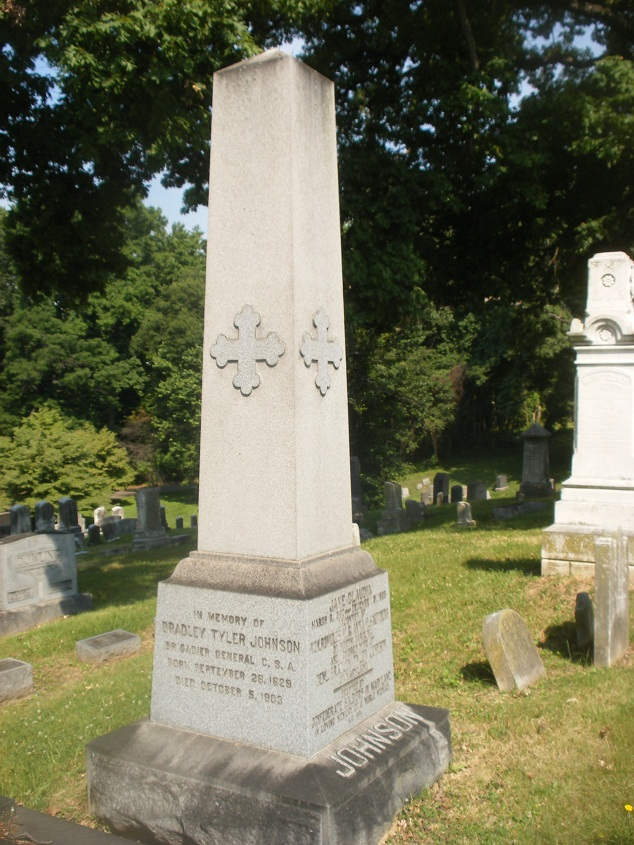
Monument for General Bradley T. Johnson, Confederate States Army

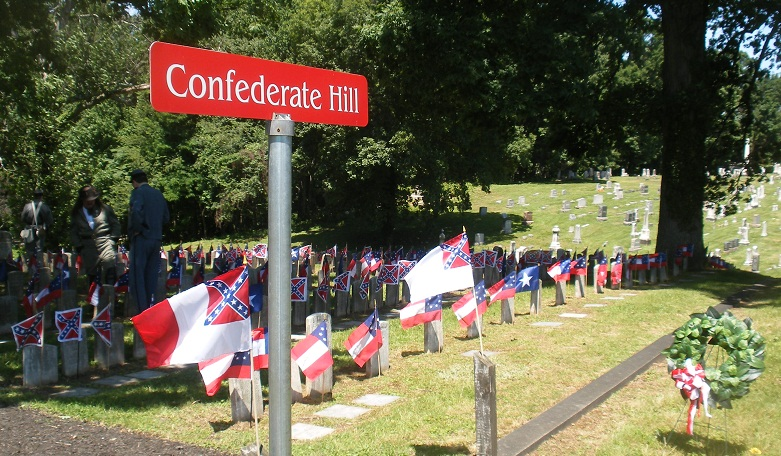
Confederate Hill during Confederate Memorial Day, 2012

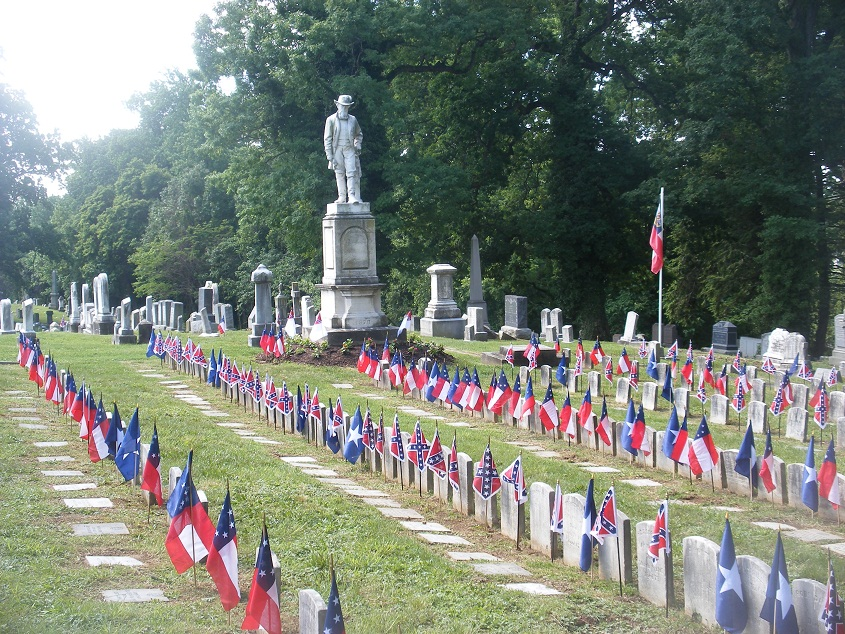
Confederate memorial and graves, Confederate Memorial Day, 2 June 2012

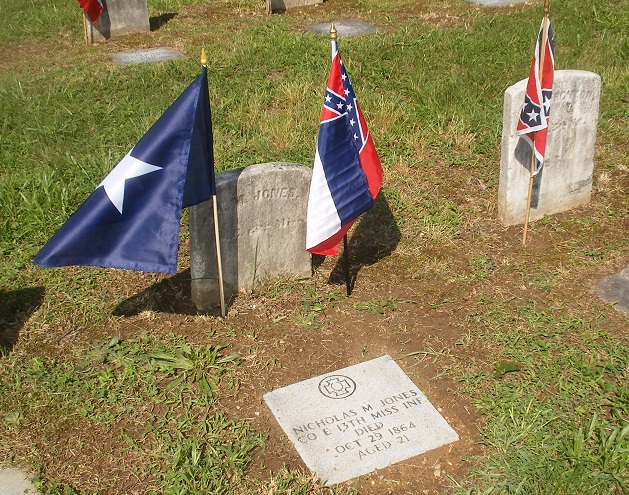
One of nearly 600 Confederate soldiers to receive a new marker

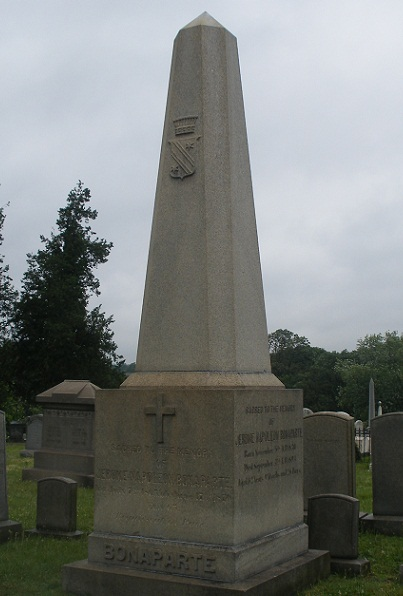
Bonaparte Monument

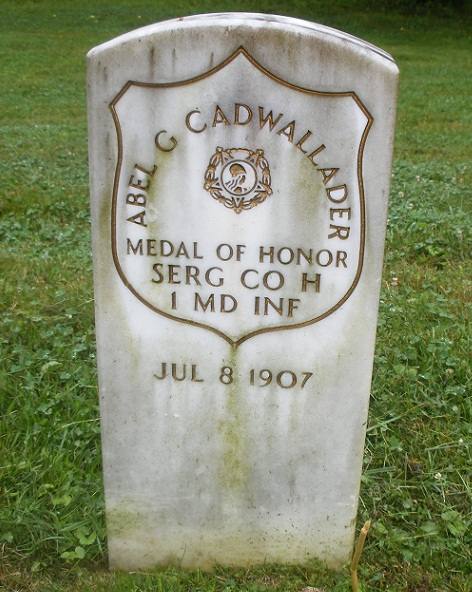
Abel Cadwallader, Union soldier and Medal of Honor recipient

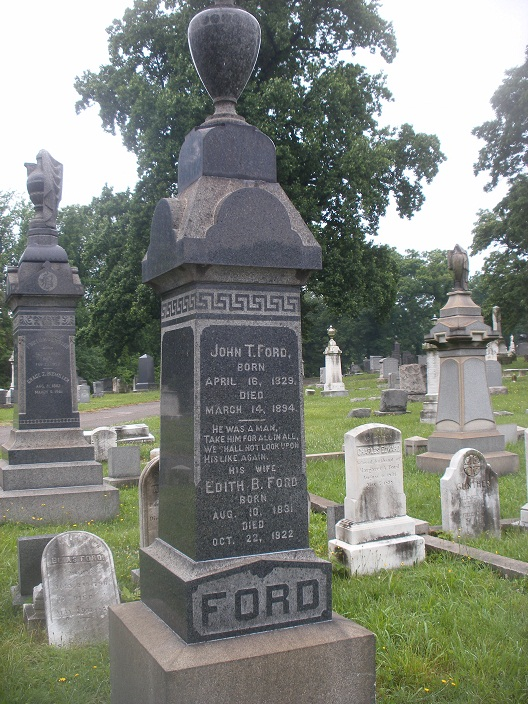
John T. Ford monument
