= Joseph Robinson Darling =

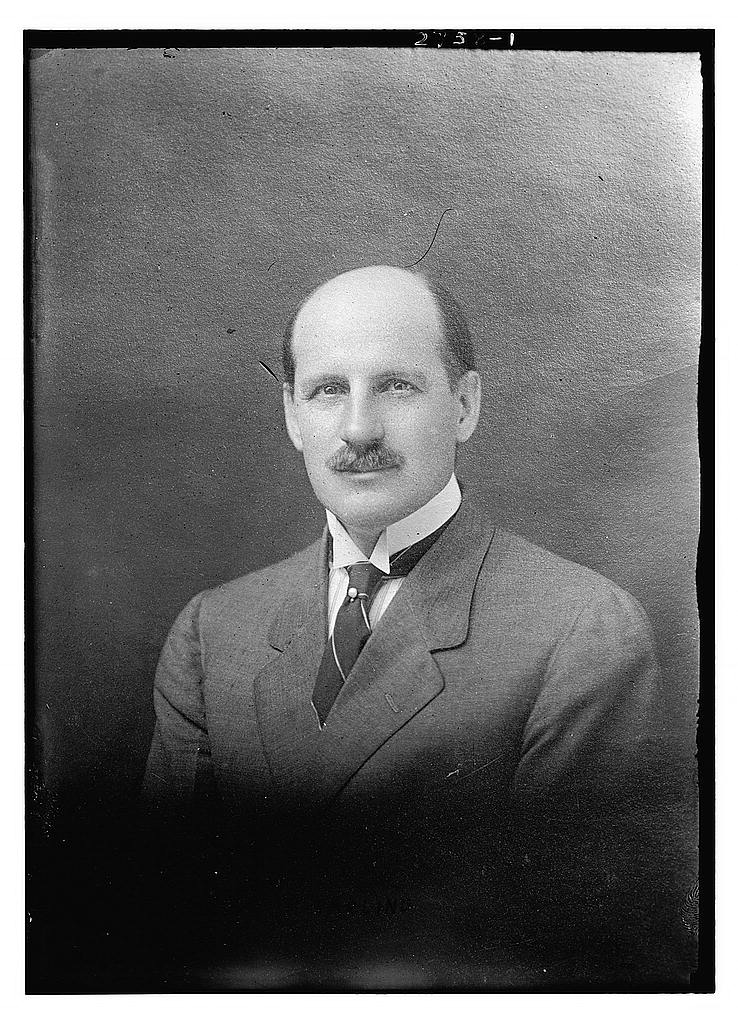
Darling circa 1913

Joseph Robinson Darling (March 19, 1872 in Chicago- September 7, 1957) was a special agent of the United States Department of Justice, author, promoter, explorer, and soldier of fortune.

== Biography ==
He prepared two government cases against the Bathtub Trust, International Harvester, and Motion Picture Patents Company. On January 1, 1914, he resigned from the Department of Justice to enter business. In 1915 he wrote "Darling on Trusts" a legal treatise. He died in Miami, Florida on September 6, 1957.

== Publications ==
- Darling on Trusts (1915)
