= Henry A. Schultz =

American politician (1844–1916)

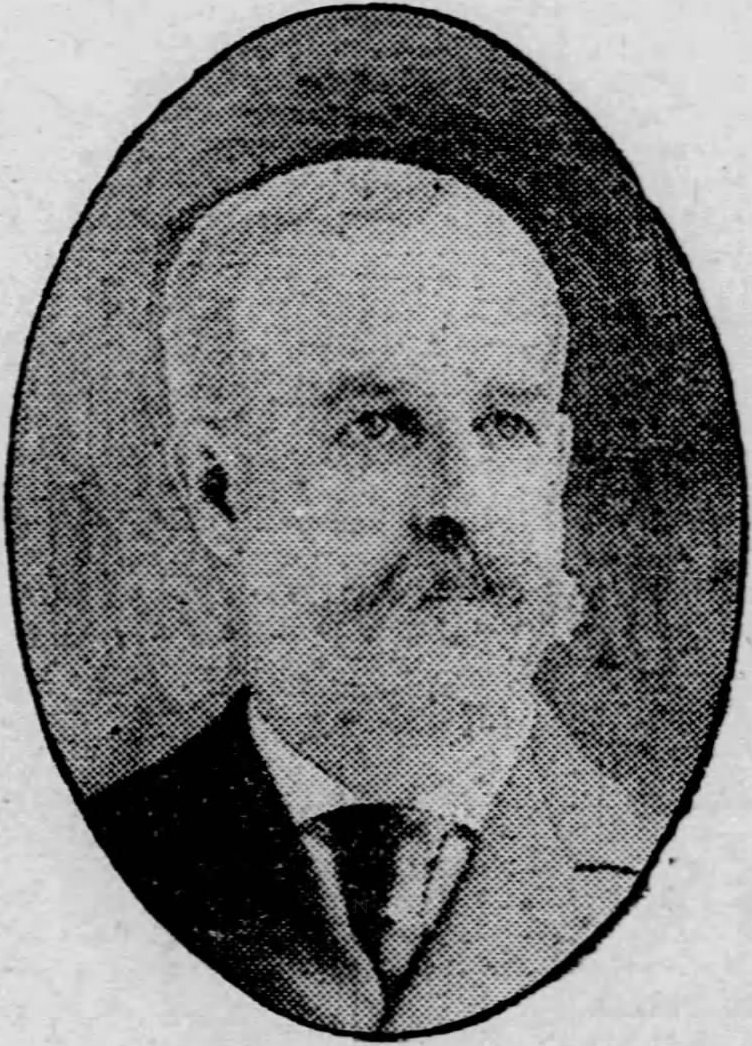
- Schultz in a 1902 newspaper

Member of the Maryland House of Representatives Baltimore's 16th ward
- In office 1882–1890

Personal details
- Born: March 13, 1844 Baltimore, Maryland, U.S.
- Died: January 18, 1916 (aged 71) Baltimore, Maryland, U.S.
- Resting place: Loudon Park Cemetery
- Party: Democratic
- Spouse: Lillie B. Loney (m. 1882; died 1892)
- Children: 1
- Occupation: Politician; businessman
- Nickname: Harry

Henry A. Schultz (March 13, 1844 – January 18, 1916) was an American politician from Maryland. He served in the Maryland House of Delegates from 1882 to 1890.

== Early life ==
Henry A. Schultz was born on March 13, 1844, in Baltimore, Maryland, to Arnold Schultz. His father was a road master of Northern Central Railway. Schultz was raised as a Baptist. He attended public and private schools in Baltimore.

== Career ==
Schultz worked in the gas fixture and metal business. He was a Democrat. He was elected to the Maryland House of Delegates, representing the 16th ward of Baltimore, in 1882 and 1886. In the 1886 session, he was acting chairman of the ways and means committee. He proposed a bill to place fire escapes on public buildings. In 1885, he was committee clerk of the First Branch City Council. He was also a member of Baltimore City Council.

In 1887, Schultz was elected clerk of the Baltimore city court. He was re-elected in 1883 and 1889. He was a director of the City Trust and Banking Company. He also served as treasurer of Maryland's Democratic Central Committee.

== Personal life ==
Schultz married Lillie B. Loney on November 21, 1882. They had one daughter, Anna May. His wife died in 1892. He lived on Harlem Avenue in Baltimore. He was a member of the Knights of Pythias.

Schultz fell done the stairs in late 1915. He died from neuritis and related complications on January 18, 1916, at the home of his daughter in Baltimore. He was buried in Loudon Park Cemetery.
