= Preston A. Pairo Jr. =

American politician (1927–2010)

Member of the Maryland House of Delegates from the 5th district
- In office 1951–1954 Serving with Carl W. Bacharach, Maurice A. Cardin, John P. Fitzgerald, Hugh A. Kennedy, John C. Luber, Marvin Mandel
- Preceded by: Charles F. Argabright, Charles M. Bandiere, Leo Charles Geraghty, Leroy W. Preston, Hugh A. Kennedy, John C. Luber
- Succeeded by: Carl W. Bacharach, Maurice A. Cardin, John P. Fitzgerald, John C. Luber, Marvin Mandel, Edgar P. Silver

Personal details
- Born: Preston Abercrombie Pairo Jr. June 5, 1927 Baltimore, Maryland, U.S.
- Died: October 10, 2010 (aged 83) Ellicott City, Maryland, U.S.
- Party: Democratic
- Spouse: Carol May Rupprecht
- Relations: W. Harry Pairo (grandfather)
- Children: 1
- Education: Baltimore Polytechnic Institute; University of Baltimore
- Occupation: Politician; lawyer

Preston Abercrombie Pairo Jr. (June 5, 1927 – October 10, 2010) was an American politician and lawyer from Maryland. He served as a member of the Maryland House of Delegates from 1951 to 1954.

== Early life ==
Preston Abercrombie Pairo Jr. was born on June 5, 1927, in Baltimore, Maryland, to Blossom (née Pritchett) and Preston A. Pairo. His grandfather was state delegate W. Harry Pairo. His father was a lawyer and police magistrate. His mother was a homemaker. He was raised on Liberty Heights Avenue in Baltimore. Pairo attended public schools in Baltimore. He graduated from the Baltimore Polytechnic Institute in 1945. He then served in the United States Navy from 1945 to 1946 aboard the USS Beatty (DD-756). He graduated from the University of Baltimore with a pre-law degree in 1948, and the University of Baltimore School of Law with a law degree in 1951. He was admitted to the bar in 1951.

== Career ==
Pairo was a lawyer. He was police magistrate of Baltimore from 1948 to 1949. He was a law clerk in Baltimore's solicitor's office from 1948 to 1951. He was assistant state's attorney of Baltimore from 1954 to 1958. In 1950, he was elected the "Most Captivating Man in Maryland – 1950". He was member of the Junior Bar of Baltimore City, dean of the Howard County Bar Association, and member and president of the Maryland Criminal Defense Attorneys Association.

Pairo was a Democrat. He served as a member of the Maryland House of Delegates, representing the 5th district, from 1951 to 1954.

In the 1950s, Pairo practiced law with his father at Court Square Building in downtown Baltimore. In 1983, he established law firm Pairo & Pairo LLC in Ellicott City with his son Preston A. Pairo III. He retired in 2007, but still remained affiliated with the law firm.

== Personal life ==
Pairo married Carol May Rupprecht, daughter of George William Rupprecht, on August 12, 1950. They had one son, Preston A. III. He was a member of the Masons, Shriners, Boumi Temple, and the Royal Order of the Jesters. He was a fan of boxing and the music of Luciano Pavarotti and Frank Sinatra. He owned a condominium in Ocean City.

Pairo died of cardiovascular disease on October 10, 2010, at his home in Ellicott City.
