= W. Harry Pairo =

American politician (died 1925)

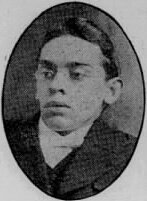
- Portrait of Pairo in a 1905 newspaper

Member of the Maryland House of Delegates from the 4th district
- In office 1904–1914 Serving with Charles W. Bald, James E. Godwin, William G. Henkel, Daniel A. Lock, Arthur E. Miller, Zachariah T. Green, Elmer J. Jones, Edgar M. Peterson, Benjamin M. Stone, Charles L. J. Carroll, Louis A. Cornthwaite, Thomas L. Parks, William Weisgerber, Gustav Krause, Frederick G. Peusch, Richard N. Scheckells, Frank T. Yates, George F. Cooper, John R. Fisher, John G. Jeffers, Harry G. Shakespeare
- Preceded by: New district
- Succeeded by: Frank F. Busch, Samuel H. Easton, Charles G. Griebel, William E. Joyce, John C. Linthicum, Charles Reviol

Personal details
- Born: William Harry Pairo
- Died: December 17, 1925 (aged 50) Baltimore, Maryland, U.S.
- Resting place: Loudon Park Cemetery
- Party: Republican
- Spouse(s): Mary Winifred Hughes (m. 1899; div. 1913) Dinah Irene Lowenstein (m. 1913)
- Relations: Preston A. Pairo Jr. (grandson)
- Children: 2
- Education: University of Maryland School of Law
- Occupation: Politician; lawyer

William Harry Pairo (died December 17, 1925) was an American politician and lawyer from Maryland. He served in the Maryland House of Delegates from 1904 to 1914.

== Early life ==
William Harry Pairo was born to Annie J. and Robert Maury Pairo. He attended the University of Maryland School of Law.

== Career ==
Pairo was a lawyer. He was a Republican. He served in the Maryland House of Delegates, representing the 4th district, from 1904 to 1914. In 1910, he was elected as minority leader of the House of Delegates. He was chairman of the Republican Party's steering committee. He was associated with the Gas Monopoly Repealer bills.

In 1914, Pairo was accused of bribery.

== Personal life ==
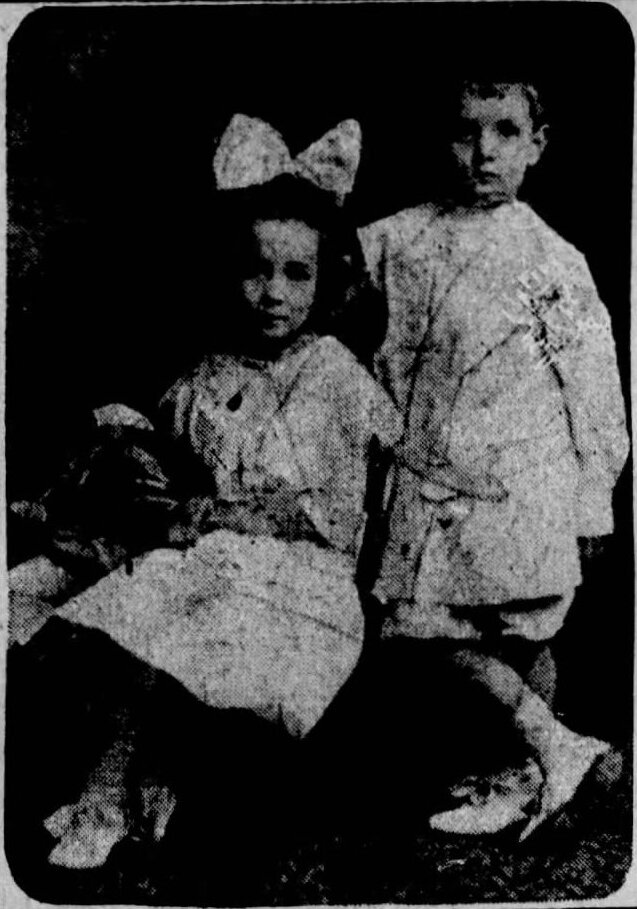
Children of W. Harry Pairo in 1910

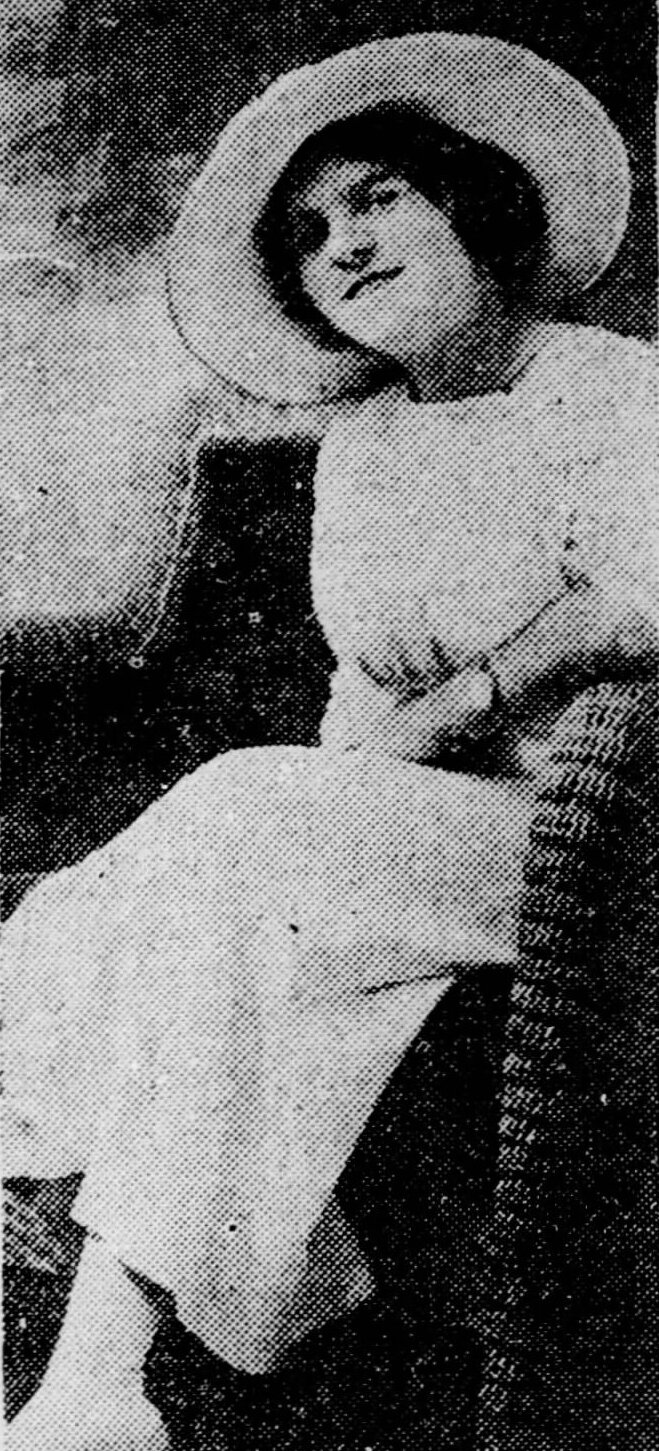
Dinah Irene Lowenstein in a 1913 newspaper

Pairo married Mary Winifred Hughes, daughter of Mary (née Davis) and Edward J. Hughes, on December 20, 1899. They had a son and daughter, Preston A. and Mary Winifred. The couple divorced in 1913 and he received custody of the children. He married Dinah Irene Lowenstein, daughter of Albert A. Lowenstein, of New York City on November 26, 1913. His grandson was Preston A. Pairo Jr. He lived on Harlem Avenue in Baltimore in 1907. He lived on Pennsylvania Avenue in Baltimore in 1913.

Pairo had typhoid fever in 1907. He died on December 17, 1925, aged 50, at his home on Liberty Heights Avenue in Baltimore. He was buried in Loudon Park Cemetery.
