= Manufacturers' Record =

American engineering magazine

- The newspaper's front page from January 9, 1913
- Categories: Engineering
- Frequency: Weekly
- First issue: 1882
- Final issue: 1954
- Country: United States
- Based in: Baltimore, Maryland, U.S.
- Language: English

The Manufacturers' Record (stylized for a period as the Manufacturers Record) was a weekly trade and engineering newspaper, published between 1882 and 1954 with a focus on the American South. Subtitled Exponent of America, it was published every Thursday in Baltimore, Maryland, by the Manufacturers' Record Publishing Company. In 1926, when its president was Frank Gould and its editor was Richard H. Edmonds, the magazine was priced at $6.50 for an annual subscription, or 20 cents for a single copy. Edmonds was the founder of the publication.

Its office was at the corner of Baltimore's Commerce Street and Water Street, while its printing plant was at the corner of South Street and Water Street. It had branch offices in Chicago (11 South La Salle Street), New York City (in the Singer Building) and Cincinnati (333 Dixie Terminal Building).

The magazine's final issue was published in 1954, at which point it was merged with Industrial Development to become the Industrial Development and Manufacturers' Record. Between 1956 and 1958, it was the official publication of the Southern Association of Science and Industry.
