= Ambrose Jerome Kennedy =

American politician (1893–1950)

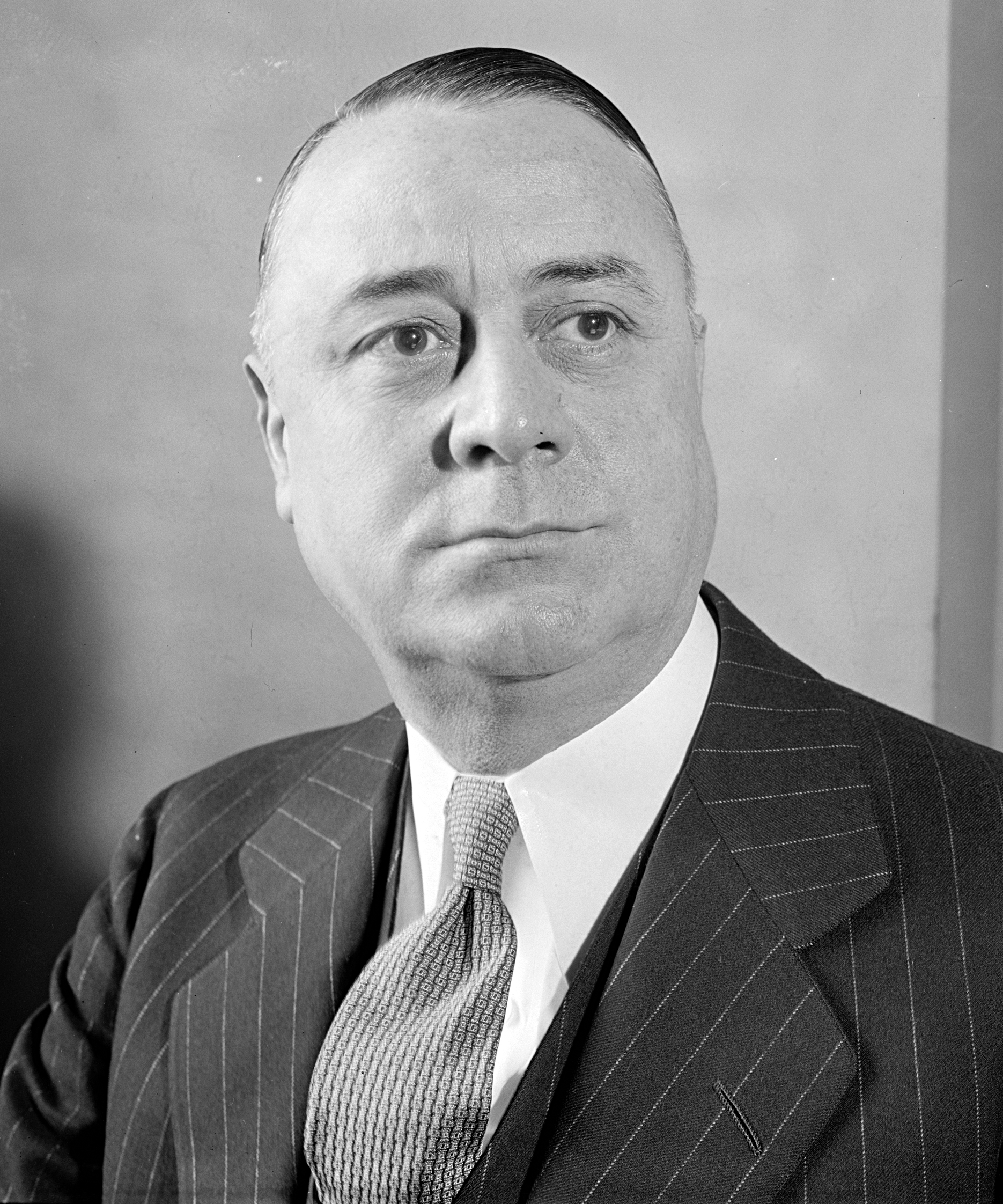

Member of the U.S. House of Representatives from Maryland's 4th district
- In office November 8, 1932 – January 3, 1941
- Preceded by: John Charles Linthicum
- Succeeded by: John Ambrose Meyer

Personal details
- Born: January 6, 1893 Baltimore, Maryland, U.S.
- Died: August 29, 1950 (aged 57) Mercy Hospital, Baltimore, Maryland, U.S.
- Resting place: New Cathedral Cemetery
- Party: Democratic

Ambrose Jerome Kennedy (January 6, 1893 – August 29, 1950) was a U.S. representative from Maryland.

Born in Baltimore, Maryland, Kennedy attended parochial schools, Calvert Hall College, and Polytechnic Institute. He was the son of Ambrose J. Kennedy Sr., a saloonkeeper and guard at the Maryland State Penitentiary, and Annie McDonald, a homemaker. Both of them emigrated to the United States in the mid- to late 19th century from County Wexford, Ireland. He was employed as a clerk for an insurance company from 1909 to 1924, and engaged in the brokerage and insurance business in 1924. He was an unsuccessful candidate for election to the Maryland House of Delegates in 1918, and served as member of the Baltimore City Council from 1922 to 1926. He served in the Maryland Senate in 1928 and 1929, and served as delegate to the Democratic National Convention in 1928 and 1932. He was appointed parole commissioner of Maryland in 1929 and served until elected to Congress.

Kennedy was elected as a Democrat to the Seventy-second Congress to fill the vacancy caused by the death of John Charles Linthicum and on the same day was elected to the Seventy-third Congress. He was reelected to the Seventy-fourth, Seventy-fifth, and Seventy-sixth Congresses and served from November 8, 1932, to January 3, 1941. In Congress, he served as chairman of the Committee on Claims (Seventy-fourth, Seventy-fifth, and Seventy-sixth Congresses), but was an unsuccessful candidate for renomination in 1940.

He resumed the brokerage and insurance business in Baltimore, as well as serving as a member of the State Unemployment Compensation Board from June 1943 to September 1945. In November 1943, he sought an appointment as the president of the Baltimore City Council but lost to C. Markland Kelly (a member of the Baltimore Park board) since 1935. By 1950, he was a senior vice-president of the insurance firm Poor, Bowen, Barlett and Kennedy. He died at Mercy Hospital in Baltimore at age 57, and is interred in the New Cathedral Cemetery. A Baltimore city park located at Valley Street and E. Chase Street is named in honor of Ambrose Kennedy, who lived nearby at 914 E. Biddle Street and attended the nearby St. John the Evangelist Catholic Church.

He married the former Mary Edna Dailey, and had six children: Mary (Joseph Erskine), Margaret (Joseph Dolan), Ambrose Jr., John (Dolores Flanigan), Mildred, and Jerome (Mary Ann McCardell). He has 15 grandchildren.

== Ambrose J. Kennedy, Jr. (1918–1989) ==
Kennedy's son, Ambrose J. Kennedy Jr. (1918–1989) followed his father into politics after helping with his father's Congressional campaigns. In 1946, Kennedy Jr. joined the Baltimore City Council representing an area of midtown Baltimore bounded by Druid Hill Avenue, Preston Street, and Aisquith Street. During his two terms in office, Kennedy Jr. chaired the Highway and Franchise Committee. After leaving office in the mid-1950s, he worked as a broker for the Poor, Bowen, Bartlett and Kennedy insurance company established by his father.

U.S. House of Representatives
Preceded by John Charles Linthicum	Member of the U.S. House of Representatives from Maryland's 4th congressional district 1932–1941	Succeeded by John Ambrose Meyer
