= James Durham =

James Durham may refer to:

- James Derham (1762–1802?), also known as James Durham, the first African American to formally practice medicine in the United States
- James Durham (baseball) (1881–1949), pitcher in Major League Baseball
- James Durham (minister), Church of Scotland minister
- James R. Durham (1833–1904), Union Army officer and Medal of Honor recipient
- James J. Durham (1849–1920), Baptist minister in South Carolina and the founder of Morris College
- James O. Durham (born 1864), American politician from Maryland
- Jim Durham (1947–2012), American sportscaster
