= Daniel Ellison =

American politician (1886–1960)

Member of the U.S. House of Representatives from Maryland's 4th district
- In office January 3, 1943 – January 3, 1945
- Preceded by: John Ambrose Meyer
- Succeeded by: George Hyde Fallon

Personal details
- Born: February 14, 1886 Russian Empire
- Died: August 20, 1960 (aged 74) Baltimore, Maryland, U.S.
- Party: Republican Party
- Education: Johns Hopkins University; University of Maryland School of Law
- Occupation: Lawyer

Daniel Ellison (February 14, 1886 – August 20, 1960) was a U.S. representative from Maryland.

Born in Russian Empire, Ellison was brought to the United States by his parents as an infant. He attended the public schools of Baltimore, Maryland, and graduated from Johns Hopkins University in 1907 and from the University of Maryland School of Law of Baltimore in 1909. He was admitted to the bar the same year and commenced practice in Baltimore.

A member of the Republican Party, he was a longtime member of the Baltimore City Council. He represented the fourth council district and served from May 1923 until December 1942 when he resigned to take his seat in Congress. During his 19 years on the City Council he was the only Republican member except during the term from 1927 to 1931 when nine of the nineteen councilmembers were Republicans. No Republicans have served on the City Council since his resignation.

Ellison was elected as a Republican to the Seventy-eighth Congress, serving January 3, 1943 – January 3, 1945. He was an unsuccessful candidate for reelection in 1944 to the Seventy-ninth Congress, losing to his former Baltimore City Council Colleague George Hyde Fallon.

He resumed the practice of law in Baltimore. In 1946 he was elected to the Maryland Senate representing Baltimore's fourth legislative district. He was in office from January 1947 to January 1951. He chose not to run for reelection in 1950.

He died in Baltimore, and is interred in Hebrew Friendship Cemetery.

== See also ==
- List of Jewish members of the United States Congress

U.S. House of Representatives
Preceded by John Ambrose Meyer	Member of the U.S. House of Representatives from Maryland's 4th congressional district 1943–1945	Succeeded by George Hyde Fallon
