= Thomas Sprigg =

American politician (1747–1809)

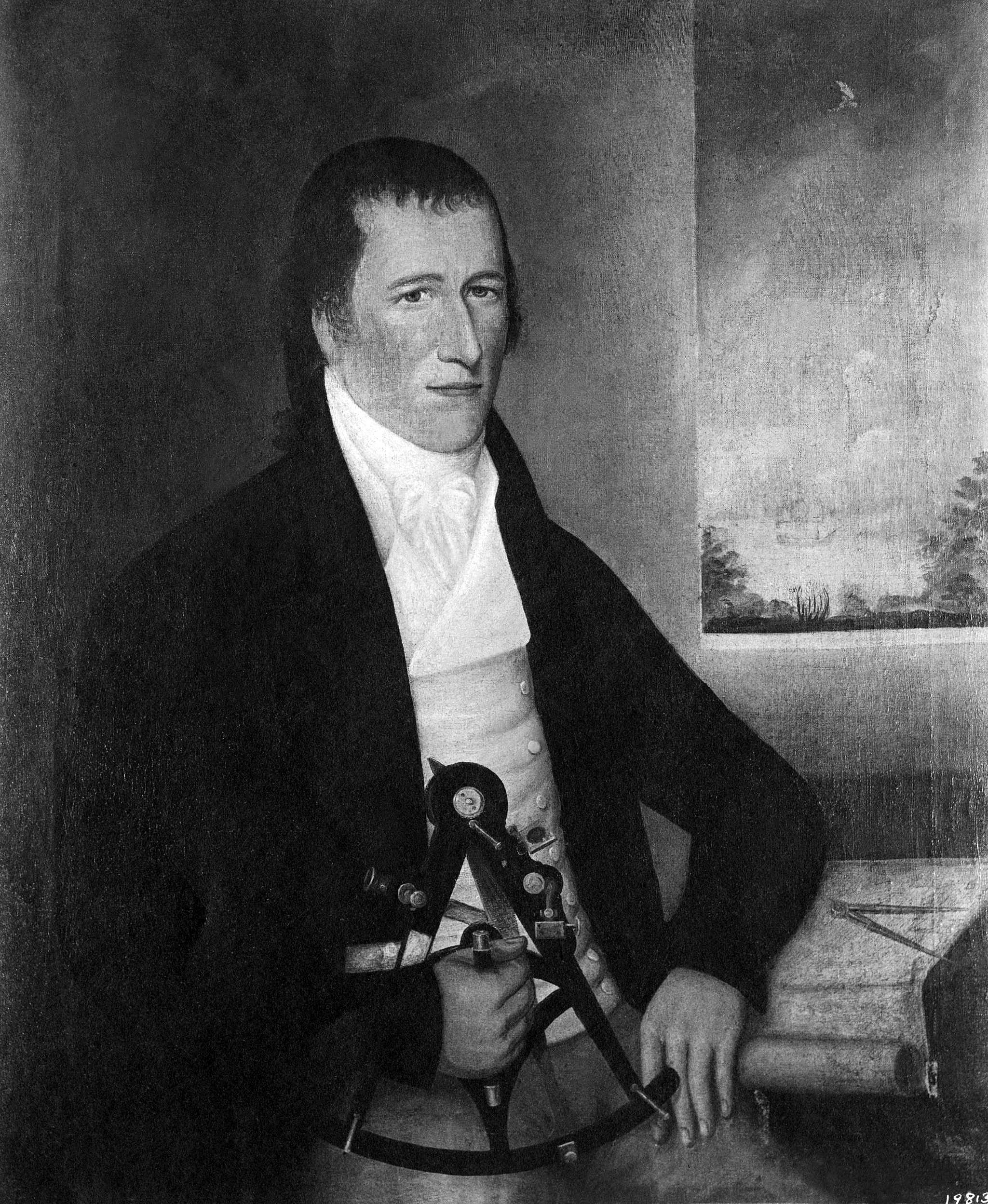

Member of the U.S. House of Representatives from Maryland's 4th district
- In office March 4, 1793 – March 3, 1797
- Preceded by: Samuel Sterett
- Succeeded by: George Baer Jr.

Personal details
- Born: 1747 Prince George's County, Maryland, British America
- Died: December 13, 1809 (aged 61–62) Washington County, Maryland, U.S.
- Party: Democratic-Republican (since 1795)
- Other political affiliations: Anti-Administration (until 1795)
- Relatives: Richard Sprigg Jr. (nephew)

Thomas Sprigg (1747 – December 13, 1809) was an American politician. He represented the fourth district of Maryland in the United States House of Representatives from 1793 to 1797.

Sprigg was born in Prince George's County, Maryland, as the eight child of Osborn and Rachel (Belt) Sprigg. He served during the American Revolutionary War as ensign in the Maryland Battalion of the Flying Camp from September to December 1776. He was appointed the first register of wills of Washington County, Maryland, in 1777, and served until September 29, 1780, when he resigned. He was a delegate to the Maryland State Convention of 1788, to vote whether Maryland should ratify the proposed Constitution of the United States. He was appointed lieutenant of Washington County by the governor and Council of Maryland on December 21, 1779.

Sprigg was elected as an Anti-Administration candidate to the Third Congress and reelected as a Democratic-Republican to the Fourth Congress, serving from March 4, 1793, to March 3, 1797. He died in Washington County, MD on December 13, 1809.

Sprigg was an uncle of Richard Sprigg, Jr., another Congressman.

U.S. House of Representatives
Preceded by Samuel Sterett	Member of the U.S. House of Representatives from Maryland's 4th congressional district 1793–1797	Succeeded by George Baer, Jr.
