= William W. McIntire =

American politician from Maryland (1850–1912)

William Watson McIntire
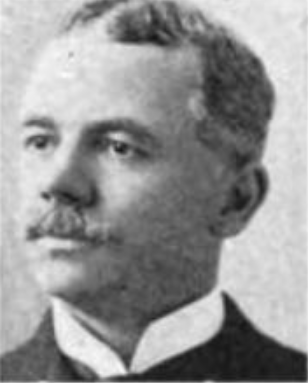

Member of the U.S. House of Representatives from Maryland's 4th district
- In office March 4, 1897 – March 3, 1899
- Preceded by: John Kissig Cowen
- Succeeded by: James William Denny

Personal details
- Born: June 30, 1850 Chambersburg, Pennsylvania, U.S.
- Died: March 30, 1912 (aged 61) Baltimore County, Maryland, U.S.
- Resting place: Loudon Park Cemetery
- Party: Republican
- Education: University of Maryland School of Law
- Occupation: Lawyer, politician

William Watson McIntire (June 30, 1850 – March 30, 1912) was a U.S. representative from Maryland's 4th congressional district.

== Biography ==
McIntire was born in Chambersburg, Pennsylvania. As a child, he moved with his parents to Washington County, Maryland. He attended public and private schools and learned the trade of machinist. In July 1872 he moved to Baltimore. He received an appointment in the United States Railway Mail Service in 1874, remaining in this service until 1885, when he resigned. He attended Hagerstown Academy and graduated from the University of Maryland School of Law in Baltimore. He was admitted to the bar in Baltimore and elected as a Republican to the city council of Baltimore in 1887 and 1888. In the campaign of 1895 he was treasurer of the Maryland Republican State and city committees.

Prominent for many years in Republican politics, McIntire was elected as a Republican to the Fifty-fifth Congress, serving from March 4, 1897, to March 3, 1899. He was part of an all-Republican Congressional delegation elected that year from Maryland. He is generally credited with obtaining the first appropriation for a new Custom House in Baltimore and with defeating a bill to move the United States Naval Academy to a Northern city. He was an unsuccessful candidate for reelection in 1898 to the Fifty-sixth Congress.

McIntire served as General Agent of the United States Life Insurance Company between 1905 and 1912. When General Peter Leary, Jr. died in 1911, he was strongly put forward to take his place on the Baltimore Sewerage Commission. Mayor J. Barry Mahool appointed him, and the appointment was so popular that the City Council suspended its rules in order to confirm it unanimously. While still on the commission, he died on a boat in the Gunpowder River in Baltimore County, Maryland, having been stricken by apoplexy when fishing for pike alone. Friends brought him to shore, but he died late in the evening without having regained consciousness. His remains were brought to his city home the next day. He is buried in Loudon Park Cemetery, Baltimore.

U.S. House of Representatives
Preceded by John Kissig Cowen	Member of the U.S. House of Representatives from Maryland's 4th congressional district 1897–1899	Succeeded by James William Denny
