= Samuel Sterett =

American politician

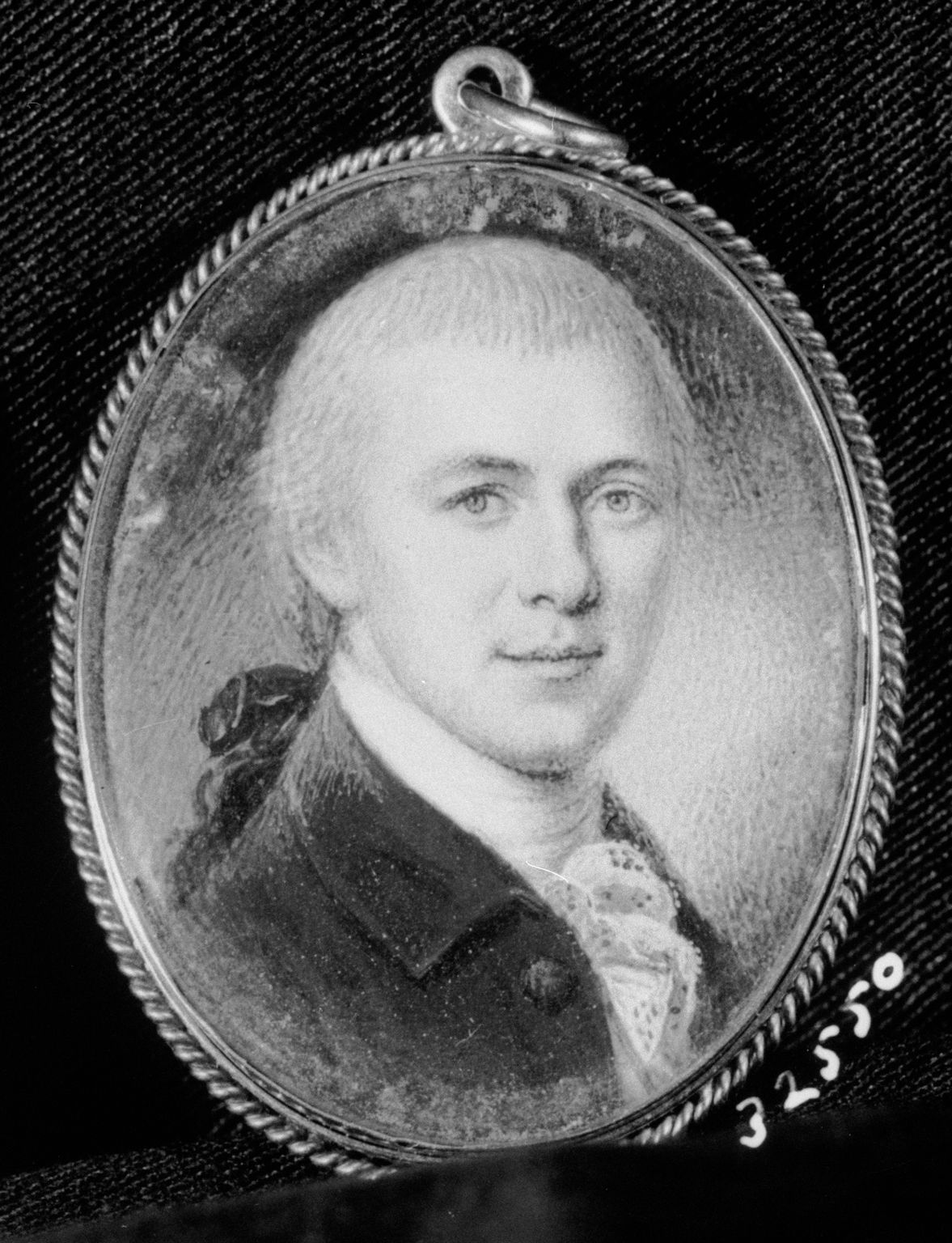
- Born: 1758; Carlisle
- Died: July 12, 1833 (aged 74–75); Baltimore
- Occupation: Politician
- Position held: United States representative (1791–1793)

Samuel Sterett (1758 – July 12, 1833) was a Representative from the fourth congressional district of Maryland.

Born in Carlisle in the Province of Pennsylvania in 1758, Sterett moved with his parents to Baltimore, in 1761. After he completed preparatory studies, he went to and graduated from the University of Pennsylvania in Philadelphia. Afterwards he held several local offices, was a member of the independent company (military) of Baltimore merchants in 1777, and in November 1782 he was appointed private secretary to the President of Congress.

Sterett was elected to the Maryland State Senate in 1789, and also was an unsuccessful candidate for the 4th congressional district that year. Following his service in the State Senate he was elected to the Second Congress (March 4, 1791 – March 3, 1793), during which he also served as secretary of the Maryland Society for Promoting the Abolition of Slavery in 1791.

In 1812, Sterett became a member of the Baltimore committee of safety. He also served as captain of an independent company at the Battle of North Point, fought on September 12, 1814. Sterett was grand marshal in Baltimore at the laying of the foundation stone of the Baltimore and Ohio Railroad on July 4, 1828.

Sterett died in Baltimore, Maryland, in 1833 and is interred in the burying ground of Westminster Church.

U.S. House of Representatives
Preceded by William Smith	Representative of the Fourth Congressional District of Maryland; 1791–1793	Succeeded by Thomas Sprigg
