= George Baer Jr. =

American politician (1763–1834)

Mayor of Frederick
- In office 1820–1823
- Preceded by: Henry Kuhn
- Succeeded by: John L. Harding

Member of the U.S. House of Representatives from Maryland's 4th district
- In office March 4, 1797 – March 3, 1801
- Preceded by: Thomas Sprigg
- Succeeded by: Daniel Hiester
- In office March 4, 1815 – March 3, 1817
- Preceded by: Samuel Ringgold
- Succeeded by: Samuel Ringgold

Member of the Maryland House of Delegates
- In office 1794–1794
- In office 1808–1809

Personal details
- Born: 1763 Frederick, Province of Maryland, British America
- Died: April 3, 1834 (aged 70–71) Frederick, Maryland, U.S.
- Resting place: Mount Olivet Cemetery
- Party: Federalist

George Baer Jr. (1763 – April 3, 1834) was a United States representative from the fourth district of Maryland, serving from 1797 to 1801 and from 1815 to 1817. He was a slave owner.

== Early life ==
George Baer Jr. was born in 1763 in Frederick, Maryland. He attended common schools.

== Career ==
Baer engaged in mercantile pursuits. He served as a member of the Maryland House of Delegates in 1794 and from 1808 to 1809. He was elected as a Federalist to the Fifth and Sixth Congresses, serving from March 4, 1797, to March 3, 1801.

Baer was a judge of the orphans’ court of Frederick County in 1813. He was elected as a Federalist to the Fourteenth Congress, serving from March 4, 1815, to March 3, 1817, afterwards resuming his former mercantile pursuits. He was mayor of Frederick in 1820.

== Personal life ==
Baer died in Frederick on April 3, 1834. He was interred in Mount Olivet Cemetery.

U.S. House of Representatives
Preceded by Thomas Sprigg	Representative of the Fourth Congressional District of Maryland; 1797–1801	Succeeded by Daniel Hiester
Preceded by Samuel Ringgold	Representative of the Fourth Congressional District of Maryland; 1815–1817	Succeeded by Samuel Ringgold
