= Maryland's 4th congressional district =

U.S. House district for Maryland

Coordinates: 39.03°N 77.0°W

- Interactive map of district boundaries since January 3, 2023
- Representative: Glenn Ivey; D–Cheverly
- Area: 318 mi^{2} (820 km^{2})
- Distribution: 97.9% urban; 2.1% rural
- Population (2025): 757,332
- Median household income: $94,651
- Ethnicity: 55.2% Black; 25.1% Hispanic; 10.7% White; 5.2% Asian; 3.0% Two or more races; 0.8% other
- Occupation: 70.7% White-collar; 15.0% Blue-collar; 14.3% Gray-collar
- Cook PVI: D+39

Maryland's 4th congressional district wraps around the eastern edge of Washington, D.C., taking in most of Prince George's County and a small portion of Montgomery County. It is home to several racially diverse middle-class suburbs, including College Park, Fort Washington, Greenbelt, and Laurel. With a median household income of $86,941, it is the wealthiest black-majority district in the United States.

Like much of the Washington metropolitan area, the 4th district is substantially influenced by the footprint of the nearby federal government. More than 22% of working adults in this district are employed in the public sector. The Washington Metro provides easy access into the nation's capital, where many employees make daily commutes. Various government entities also sit within the 4th district, most notably the United States Census Bureau, NASA's Goddard Space Flight Center and the Beltsville Agricultural Research Center. The University of Maryland, College Park—the state's flagship public institution of higher education—is another major presence.

Throughout much of the 20th century, the area within this district was predominately white. But as a thriving black middle class emerged in the region and laws eliminating racial discrimination in housing were passed, many African Americans opted to leave Washington for Prince George's County in search of a better quality of life. By the early 1990s, the county had become majority black, and today white voters comprise just 11% of the 4th district. Recently, the district has experienced large amounts of immigration from El Salvador, Guatemala, and Honduras in Central America, leading to the district having the largest Latino population in Maryland and one of the largest Central American populations out of any district. These racial transformations have turned the district into the most Democratic seat in Maryland and one of the most Democratic in the country, with a Cook Partisan Voting Index rating of D+39. In 2022, Democrat Glenn Ivey was elected to represent it with 90.1% of the vote.

== Recent election results from statewide races ==
Year	Office	Results
2008	President	Obama 90% – 10%
2012	President	Obama 92% – 8%
2012	Senate	Cardin 82% – 6%
2014	Governor	Brown 86% – 14%
2016	President	Clinton 89% – 7%
2016	Senate	Van Hollen 88% – 8%
2018	Senate	Cardin 91% – 7%
2018	Governor	Jealous 73% – 26%
2018	Attorney General	Frosh 92% – 8%
2020	President	Biden 89% – 9%
2022	Senate	Van Hollen 91% – 9%
2022	Governor	Moore 89% – 8%
2022	Comptroller	Lierman 89% – 10%
2022	Attorney General	Brown 91% – 9%
2024	President	Harris 85% – 12%
2024	Senate	Alsobrooks 82% – 17%

== Historical boundaries ==
Maryland's fourth congressional district was one of the about 50 original congressional districts. When it was organized in 1788, it covered Baltimore, Baltimore County, and Harford County. According to the 1790 census, the fourth district had a population of 53,913, nearly 20% of whom were slaves.

In 1792, the fourth district was moved to western Maryland, with its eastern boundary being a north to south line running about the midpoint of Frederick County, Maryland. The new district had a population of 36,026, with less than 10% of the population being slaves. The 1800 census population was 38,015, and the boundaries remained unchanged in 1802.

== Composition ==
For the 118th and successive Congresses (based on redistricting following the 2020 census), the district contains all or portions of the following counties and communities:

Montgomery County (7)

Ashton-Sandy Spring (part; also 8th), Burtonsville, Calverton (part; also 8th; shared with Prince George's County), Cloverly (part; also 8th), Fairland (part; also 8th), Spencerville (part; also 8th), Takoma Park (part; also 8th)

Prince George's County (64)

Accokeek (part; also 5th), Adelphi, Beltsville, Berwyn Heights, Bladensburg, Brentwood, Calverton (part; also 8th; shared with Montgomery County), Camp Springs (part; also 5th), Capitol Heights, Cedar Heights, Cheverly, Chillum, Clinton, College Park, Colmar Manor, Coral Hills, Cottage City, District Heights, East Riverdale, Edmonston, Fairmount Heights, Forestville, Friendly, Glenn Dale (part; also 5th), Fairwood (part; also 5th), Forest Heights, Forestville (part; also 5th) Fort Washington, Glassmanor, Glenarden, Greenbelt, Hillcrest Heights, Hillandale (part; also 8th; shared with Montgomery County), Hyattsville, Konterra, Lake Arbor (part; also 5th), Landover, Landover Hills, Langley Park, Lanham, Laurel, Marlow Heights, Maryland Park, Mitchellville (part; also 5th), Morningside, Mount Rainier, National Harbor, New Carrollton, North Brentwood, Oxon Hill, Peppermill Village, Riverdale Park, Seabrook, Seat Pleasant, Silver Hill, South Laurel, Springdale, Suitland, Summerfield, Temple Hills, University Park, Walker Mill, West Laurel, Woodlawn

== Recent elections ==
=== 1970s ===
Maryland's 4th congressional district election, 1970
Party	Candidate	Votes	%
Democratic	Paul Sarbanes	54,936	70.05
Republican	David Fentress	23,491	29.95
Total votes		78,427	100.00
Democratic hold			

Maryland's 4th congressional district election, 1972
Party	Candidate	Votes	%
Republican	Marjorie Holt	87,534	59.38
Democratic	Werner Fornos	59,877	40.62
Total votes		147,411	100.00
Republican gain from Democratic			

Maryland's 4th congressional district election, 1974
Party	Candidate	Votes	%
Republican	Marjorie Holt (inc.)	61,208	58.15
Democratic	Fred L. Wineland	44,059	41.85
Total votes		105,267	100.00
Republican hold			

Maryland's 4th congressional district election, 1976
Party	Candidate	Votes	%
Republican	Marjorie Holt (inc.)	95,158	57.67
Democratic	Werner Fornos	69,855	42.33
Total votes		165,013	100.00
Republican hold			

Maryland's 4th congressional district election, 1978
Party	Candidate	Votes	%
Republican	Marjorie Holt (inc.)	71,374	62.04
Democratic	Sue F. Ward	43,663	37.96
Total votes		115,037	100.00
Republican hold			

=== 1980s ===
Maryland's 4th congressional district election, 1980
Party	Candidate	Votes	%
Republican	Marjorie Holt (inc.)	120,985	71.86
Democratic	James J. Riley	47,375	28.14
Total votes		168,360	100.00
Republican hold			

Maryland's 4th congressional district election, 1982
Party	Candidate	Votes	%
Republican	Marjorie Holt (inc.)	75,617	61.20
Democratic	Patricia O'Brien Aiken	47,947	38.80
Total votes		123,564	100.00
Republican hold			

Maryland's 4th congressional district election, 1984
Party	Candidate	Votes	%
Republican	Marjorie Holt (inc.)	114,430	66.24
Democratic	Howard M. Greenbaum	58,312	33.76
Write-ins		1	<0.01
Total votes		172,743	100.00
Republican hold			

Maryland's 4th congressional district election, 1986
Party	Candidate	Votes	%
Democratic	C. Thomas McMillen	65,071	50.16
Republican	Robert R. Neall	64,643	49.84
Total votes		129,714	100.00
Democratic gain from Republican			

Maryland's 4th congressional district election, 1988
Party	Candidate	Votes	%
Democratic	C. Thomas McMillen (inc.)	128,624	68.30
Republican	Bradlyn McClanahan	59,688	31.70
Total votes		188,312	100.00
Democratic hold			

=== 1990s ===
Maryland's 4th congressional district election, 1990
Party	Candidate	Votes	%
Democratic	C. Thomas McMillen (inc.)	85,601	58.85
Republican	Bob Duckworth	59,846	41.15
Total votes		145,447	100.00
Democratic hold			

Maryland's 4th congressional district election, 1992
Party	Candidate	Votes	%
Democratic	Al Wynn	136,902	75.19
Republican	Michele Dyson	45,166	24.81
Total votes		182,068	100.00
Democratic hold			

Maryland's 4th congressional district election, 1994
Party	Candidate	Votes	%
Democratic	Al Wynn (inc.)	93,148	75.03
Republican	Michele Dyson	30,999	24.97
Total votes		124,147	100.00
Democratic hold			

Maryland's 4th congressional district election, 1996
Party	Candidate	Votes	%
Democratic	Al Wynn (inc.)	142,094	85.19
Republican	John B. Kimble	24,700	14.81
Total votes		166,794	100.00
Democratic hold			

Maryland's 4th congressional district election, 1998
Party	Candidate	Votes	%
Democratic	Al Wynn (inc.)	129,139	85.72
Republican	John B. Kimble	21,518	14.28
Total votes		150,657	100.00
Democratic hold			

=== 2000s ===
Maryland's 4th congressional district election, 2000
Party	Candidate	Votes	%
Democratic	Al Wynn (inc.)	172,624	87.20
Republican	John B. Kimble	24,973	12.61
Write-ins		372	0.19
Total votes		197,969	100.00
Democratic hold			

Maryland's 4th congressional district election, 2002
Party	Candidate	Votes	%
Democratic	Al Wynn (inc.)	131,644	78.96
Republican	John B. Kimble	34,890	20.93
Write-ins		195	0.12
Total votes		166,729	100.00
Democratic hold			

Maryland's 4th congressional district election, 2004
Party	Candidate	Votes	%
Democratic	Al Wynn (inc.)	196,809	75.23
Republican	John McKinnis	52,907	20.22
Green	Theresa Mitchell Dudley	11,885	4.54
Write-ins		6	<0.01
Total votes		261,607	100.00
Democratic hold			

Maryland's 4th congressional district election, 2006
Party	Candidate	Votes	%
Democratic	Al Wynn (inc.)	141,897	80.67
Republican	Michael Moshe Starkman	32,792	18.64
Write-ins		1,214	0.69
Total votes		175,903	100.00
Democratic hold			

Maryland's 4th congressional district special election, 2008
Party	Candidate	Votes	%
Democratic	Donna Edwards	16,481	80.54
Republican	Peter James	3,638	17.78
Libertarian	Thibeaux Lincecum	216	1.06
Write-ins		127	0.62
Total votes		20,462	100.00
Democratic hold			

Maryland's 4th congressional district election, 2008
Party	Candidate	Votes	%
Democratic	Donna Edwards (inc.)	258,704	85.83
Republican	Peter James	38,739	12.85
Libertarian	Thibeaux Lincecum	3,384	1.12
Write-ins		604	0.20
Total votes		301,431	100.00
Democratic hold			

=== 2010s ===
Maryland's 4th congressional district election, 2010
Party	Candidate	Votes	%
Democratic	Donna Edwards (inc.)	160,228	83.44
Republican	Robert Broadus	31,467	16.39
Write-ins		325	0.17
Total votes		192,020	100.00
Democratic hold			

Maryland's 4th congressional district election, 2012
Party	Candidate	Votes	%
Democratic	Donna Edwards (inc.)	240,385	77.17
Republican	Faith M. Loudon	64,560	20.72
Libertarian	Scott Soffen	6,204	1.99
N/A	Write-ins	363	0.12
Total votes		311,512	100
Democratic hold			

Maryland's 4th congressional district election, 2014
Party	Candidate	Votes	%
Democratic	Donna Edwards (inc.)	134,628	70.18
Republican	Nancy Hoyt	54,217	28.26
Libertarian	Arvin Vohra	2,795	1.46
N/A	Write-ins	197	0.10
Total votes		191,837	100
Democratic hold			

Maryland's 4th congressional district, 2016
Party	Candidate	Votes	%
Democratic	Anthony Brown	237,501	74.1
Republican	George McDermott	68,670	21.4
Green	Kamesha T. Clark	8,204	2.6
Libertarian	Benjamin Lee Krause	5,744	1.8
n/a	Write-ins	531	0.2
Total votes		320,650	100.0
Democratic hold			

Maryland's 4th congressional district, 2018
Party	Candidate	Votes	%
Democratic	Anthony Brown (incumbent)	209,642	78.1
Republican	George McDermott	53,327	19.9
Libertarian	Dave Bishop	5,326	2.0
n/a	Write-ins	288	0.1
Total votes		268,583	100.0
Democratic hold			

=== 2020s ===
Maryland's 4th congressional district, 2020
Party	Candidate	Votes	%
Democratic	Anthony Brown (incumbent)	282,119	79.6
Republican	George McDermott	71,671	20.2
Write-in		739	0.2
Total votes		354,529	100.0
Democratic hold			

Maryland's 4th congressional district, 2022
Party	Candidate	Votes	%
Democratic	Glenn Ivey	144,168	90.1
Republican	Jeff Warner	15,441	9.6
Write-in		400	0.3
Total votes		160,009	100.0
Democratic hold			

Maryland's 4th congressional district, 2024
Party	Candidate	Votes	%
Democratic	Glenn Ivey	239,596	88.42
Republican	George McDermott	30,454	11.24
Write-in		920	0.34
Total votes		270,970	100.0
Democratic hold			

== List of members representing the district ==
=== 1789–1835: one seat ===
Name	Party	Years	Cong ress	Electoral history
District created March 4, 1789
William Smith (Baltimore)	Anti-Administration	March 4, 1789 – March 3, 1791	1st	Elected in 1789. Retired.
Samuel Sterett (Baltimore)	Anti-Administration	March 4, 1791 – March 3, 1793	2nd	Elected in 1790. [data missing]
Thomas Sprigg (Washington County)	Anti-Administration	March 4, 1793 – March 3, 1795	3rd 4th	Elected in 1792. Re-elected in 1794. Retired.
Thomas Sprigg (Washington County)	Democratic-Republican	March 4, 1795 – March 3, 1797	3rd 4th	Elected in 1792. Re-elected in 1794. Retired.
George Baer Jr. (Frederick)	Federalist	March 4, 1797 – March 3, 1801	5th 6th	Elected in 1796. Re-elected in 1798. Retired.
Daniel Hiester (Hagerstown)	Democratic-Republican	March 4, 1801 – March 7, 1804	7th 8th	Elected in 1801. Re-elected in 1803. Died.
Vacant		March 7, 1804 – November 6, 1804	8th	
Roger Nelson (Frederick)	Democratic-Republican	November 6, 1804 – May 14, 1810	8th 9th 10th 11th	Elected October 1, 1804 to finish Hiester's term. Elected the same day to the next term. Re-elected in 1806. Re-elected in 1808. Resigned to become associate justice of Maryland's 5th judicial circuit.
Vacant		May 14, 1810 – October 15, 1810	11th	
Samuel Ringgold (Hagerstown)	Democratic-Republican	October 15, 1810 – March 3, 1815	11th 12th 13th	Elected October 1, 1810 to finish Nelson's term. Also elected the same day to the next term. Re-elected in 1812. Lost re-election.
George Baer Jr. (Frederick)	Federalist	March 4, 1815 – March 3, 1817	14th	Elected in 1814. Retired.
Samuel Ringgold (Hagerstown)	Democratic-Republican	March 4, 1817 – March 3, 1821	15th 16th	Elected in 1816. Retired.
John Nelson (Frederick)	Democratic-Republican	March 4, 1821 – March 3, 1823	17th	Elected in 1820; Retired.
John Lee (Petersville)	Federalist (Note: Supported the Jackson faction in the 1824 United States presidential election)	March 4, 1823 – March 3, 1825	18th	Elected in 1822; Lost re-election.
Thomas C. Worthington (Frederick)	Anti-Jacksonian	March 4, 1825 – March 3, 1827	19th	Elected in 1824; Retired.
Michael Sprigg (Frostburg)	Jacksonian	March 4, 1827 – March 3, 1831	20th 21st	Elected in 1826; Re-elected in 1829; Lost re-election.
Francis Thomas (Frederick)	Jacksonian	March 4, 1831 – March 3, 1833	22nd	Elected in 1831. Redistricted to the 7th district.
James P. Heath (Baltimore)	Jacksonian	March 4, 1833 – March 3, 1835	23rd	Elected in 1833. [data missing]

=== 1835–1843: two seats ===
From 1835 to 1843, two seats were apportioned, elected at-large on a general ticket.

Years	Congress	Seat A			Seat B		
Years	Congress	Name	Party	Electoral history	Name	Party	Electoral history
March 4, 1835 – March 3, 1837	24th	Benjamin Chew Howard (Baltimore)	Jacksonian	Elected in 1835. Re-elected in 1837.	Isaac McKim (Baltimore)	Jacksonian	Redistricted from the 5th district and re-elected in 1835. Died.
March 4, 1837 – April 1, 1838	25th	Benjamin Chew Howard (Baltimore)	Democratic	Elected in 1835. Re-elected in 1837.	Isaac McKim (Baltimore)	Democratic	Redistricted from the 5th district and re-elected in 1835. Died.
April 1, 1838 – April 25, 1838	25th	Benjamin Chew Howard (Baltimore)	Democratic	Elected in 1835. Re-elected in 1837.	Vacant		
April 25, 1838 – March 3, 1839	25th	Benjamin Chew Howard (Baltimore)	Democratic	Elected in 1835. Re-elected in 1837.	John P. Kennedy (Baltimore)	Whig	Elected to finish McKim's term. [data missing]
March 4, 1839 – March 3, 1841	26th	James Carroll (Baltimore)	Democratic	Elected in 1839. [data missing]	Solomon Hillen (Baltimore)	Democratic	Elected in 1839. [data missing]
March 4, 1841 – March 3, 1843	27th	Alexander Randall (Annapolis)	Whig	Elected in 1841. [data missing]	John P. Kennedy (Baltimore)	Whig	Elected in 1841. [data missing]

=== 1843–present: one seat ===
Name	Party	Years	Congress	Electoral history	Location
John P. Kennedy (Baltimore)	Whig	March 4, 1843 – March 3, 1845	28th	Elected late in 1844. [data missing]	
William Fell Giles (Baltimore)	Democratic	March 4, 1845 – March 3, 1847	29th	Elected in 1845. [data missing]	
Robert Milligan McLane (Baltimore)	Democratic	March 4, 1847 – March 3, 1851	30th 31st	Elected in 1847. Re-elected in 1849. [data missing]	
Thomas Yates Walsh (Baltimore)	Whig	March 4, 1851 – March 3, 1853	32nd	Elected in 1851. [data missing]	
William Thomas Hamilton (Hagerstown)	Democratic	March 4, 1853 – March 3, 1855	33rd	Redistricted from the 2nd district and re-elected in 1853. [data missing]	
Henry Winter Davis (Baltimore)	American	March 4, 1855 – March 3, 1861	34th 35th 36th	Elected in 1855. Re-elected in 1857. Re-elected in 1859. [data missing]	
Henry May (Baltimore)	Union	March 4, 1861 – March 3, 1863	37th	Elected in 1861. [data missing]	
Francis Thomas (Frankville)	Unconditional Union	March 4, 1863 – March 3, 1867	38th 39th 40th	Redistricted from the 5th district and re-elected in 1863. Re-elected in 1864. Re-elected in 1866. [data missing]	
Francis Thomas (Frankville)	Republican	March 4, 1867 – March 3, 1869	38th 39th 40th	Redistricted from the 5th district and re-elected in 1863. Re-elected in 1864. Re-elected in 1866. [data missing]	
Patrick Hamill (Oakland)	Democratic	March 4, 1869 – March 3, 1871	41st	Elected in 1868. [data missing]	
John Ritchie (Frederick)	Democratic	March 4, 1871 – March 3, 1873	42nd	Elected in 1870. [data missing]	
Thomas Swann (Baltimore)	Democratic	March 4, 1873 – March 3, 1879	43rd 44th 45th	Redistricted from the 3rd district and re-elected in 1872. Re-elected in 1874. Re-elected in 1876. [data missing]	
Robert Milligan McLane (Baltimore)	Democratic	March 4, 1879 – March 3, 1883	46th 47th	Elected in 1878. Re-elected in 1880. [data missing]	
John Van Lear Findlay (Baltimore)	Democratic	March 4, 1883 – March 3, 1887	48th 49th	Elected in 1882. Re-elected in 1884. [data missing]	
Isidor Rayner (Baltimore)	Democratic	March 4, 1887 – March 3, 1889	50th	Elected in 1886. [data missing]	
Henry Stockbridge Jr. (Baltimore)	Republican	March 4, 1889 – March 3, 1891	51st	Elected in 1888. [data missing]	
Isidor Rayner (Baltimore)	Democratic	March 4, 1891 – March 3, 1895	52nd 53rd	Elected in 1890. Re-elected in 1892. [data missing]	
John Kissig Cowen (Baltimore)	Democratic	March 4, 1895 – March 3, 1897	54th	Elected in 1894. [data missing]	
William Watson McIntire (Baltimore)	Republican	March 4, 1897 – March 3, 1899	55th	Elected in 1896. [data missing]	
James William Denny (Baltimore)	Democratic	March 4, 1899 – March 3, 1901	56th	Elected in 1898. [data missing]	
Charles Reginald Schirm (Baltimore)	Republican	March 4, 1901 – March 3, 1903	57th	Elected in 1900. [data missing]	
James William Denny (Baltimore)	Democratic	March 4, 1903 – March 3, 1905	58th	Elected in 1902. [data missing]	
John Gill Jr. (Baltimore)	Democratic	March 4, 1905 – March 3, 1911	59th 60th 61st	Elected in 1904. Re-elected in 1906. Re-elected in 1908. [data missing]	
John Charles Linthicum (Baltimore)	Democratic	March 4, 1911 – October 5, 1932	62nd 63rd 64th 65th 66th 67th 68th 69th 70th 71st 72nd	Elected in 1910. Re-elected in 1912. Re-elected in 1914. Re-elected in 1916. Re-elected in 1918. Re-elected in 1920. Re-elected in 1922. Re-elected in 1924. Re-elected in 1926. Re-elected in 1928. Re-elected in 1930. Died.	
Vacant		October 5, 1932 – November 8, 1932	72nd		
Ambrose Jerome Kennedy (Baltimore)	Democratic	November 8, 1932 – January 3, 1941	72nd 73rd 74th 75th 76th	Elected to finish Linthicum's term. Re-elected in 1932. Re-elected in 1934. Re-elected in 1936. Re-elected in 1938. [data missing]	
John Ambrose Meyer (Baltimore)	Democratic	January 3, 1941 – January 3, 1943	77th	Elected in 1940. [data missing]	
Daniel Ellison (Baltimore)	Republican	January 3, 1943 – January 3, 1945	78th	Elected in 1942. [data missing]	
George Hyde Fallon (Baltimore)	Democratic	January 3, 1945 – January 3, 1971	79th 80th 81st 82nd 83rd 84th 85th 86th 87th 88th 89th 90th 91st	Elected in 1944. Re-elected in 1946. Re-elected in 1948. Re-elected in 1950. Re-elected in 1952. Re-elected in 1954. Re-elected in 1956. Re-elected in 1958. Re-elected in 1960. Re-elected in 1962. Re-elected in 1964. Re-elected in 1966. Re-elected in 1968. Lost renomination	
Paul Sarbanes (Baltimore)	Democratic	January 3, 1971 – January 3, 1973	92nd	Elected in 1970. Redistricted to the 3rd district.	
Marjorie Holt (Severna Park)	Republican	January 3, 1973 – January 3, 1987	93rd 94th 95th 96th 97th 98th 99th	Elected in 1972. Re-elected in 1974. Re-elected in 1976. Re-elected in 1978. Re-elected in 1980. Re-elected in 1982. Re-elected in 1984. [data missing]	
Tom McMillen (Crofton)	Democratic	January 3, 1987 – January 3, 1993	100th 101st 102nd	Elected in 1986. Re-elected in 1988. Re-elected in 1990. [data missing]	
Albert Wynn (Mitchellville)	Democratic	January 3, 1993 – May 31, 2008	103rd 104th 105th 106th 107th 108th 109th 110th	Elected in 1992. Re-elected in 1994. Re-elected in 1996. Re-elected in 1998. Re-elected in 2000. Re-elected in 2002. Re-elected in 2004. Lost renomination and resigned.	1993–2003 [data missing]
Albert Wynn (Mitchellville)	Democratic	January 3, 1993 – May 31, 2008	103rd 104th 105th 106th 107th 108th 109th 110th	Elected in 1992. Re-elected in 1994. Re-elected in 1996. Re-elected in 1998. Re-elected in 2000. Re-elected in 2002. Re-elected in 2004. Lost renomination and resigned.	2003–2013
Vacant		May 31, 2008 – June 17, 2008	110th		2003–2013
Donna Edwards (Oxon Hill)	Democratic	June 17, 2008 – January 3, 2017	110th 111th 112th 113th 114th	Elected to finish Wynn's term. Re-elected in 2008. Re-elected in 2010. Re-elected in 2012. Re-elected in 2014. Retired to run for U.S. Senator.	2003–2013
Donna Edwards (Oxon Hill)	Democratic	June 17, 2008 – January 3, 2017	110th 111th 112th 113th 114th	Elected to finish Wynn's term. Re-elected in 2008. Re-elected in 2010. Re-elected in 2012. Re-elected in 2014. Retired to run for U.S. Senator.	2013–2023
Anthony Brown (Bowie)	Democratic	January 3, 2017 – January 3, 2023	115th 116th 117th	Elected in 2016. Re-elected in 2018. Re-elected in 2020. Retired to successfully run for Attorney General of Maryland.	2013–2023
Glenn Ivey (Cheverly)	Democratic	January 3, 2023 – present	118th 119th	Elected in 2022. Re-elected in 2024. Re-elected in 2026.	2023–present

== See also ==
- Maryland's congressional districts
- List of United States congressional districts
