= John K. Cowen =

American politician (1844–1904)

John Kissig Cowen
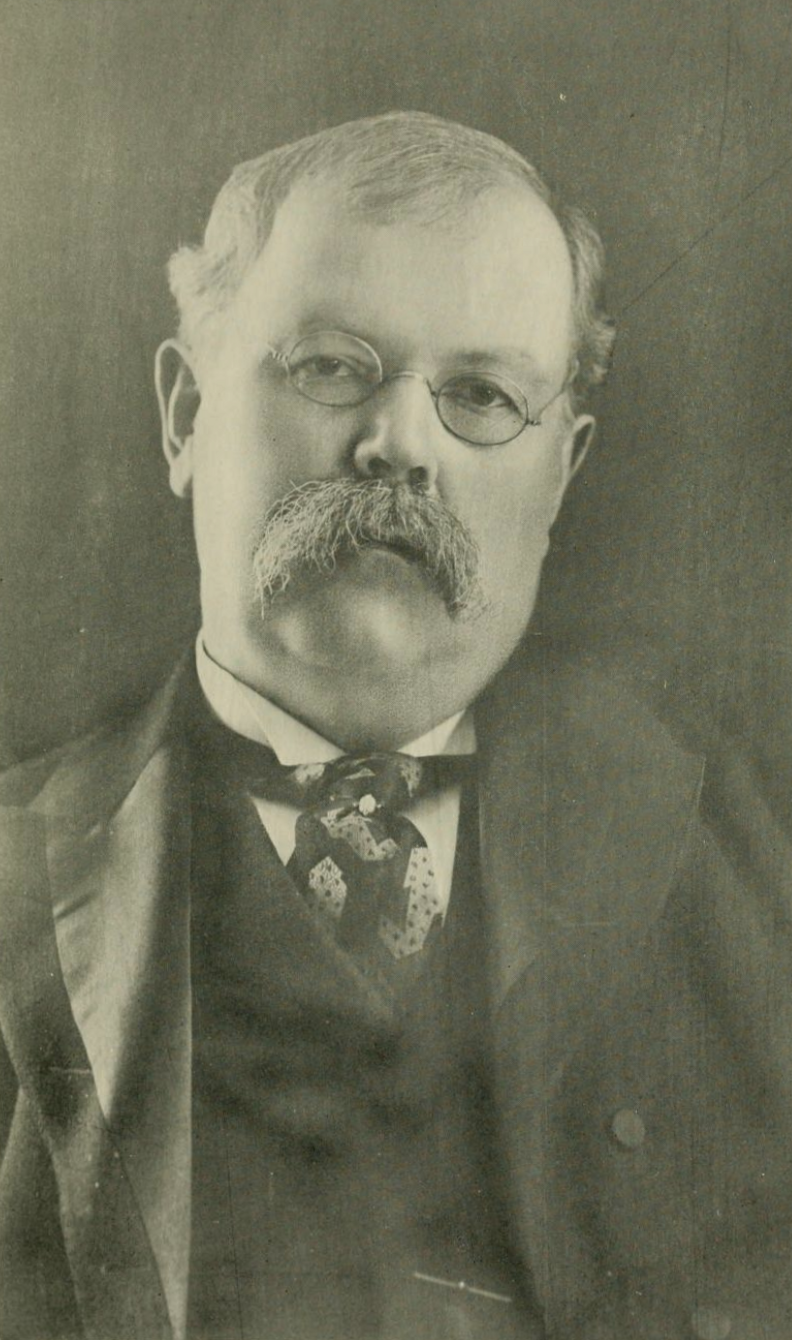
- Cowen in 1911 publication

Member of the U.S. House of Representatives from Maryland's 4th district
- In office March 4, 1895 – March 3, 1897
- Preceded by: Isidor Rayner
- Succeeded by: William Watson McIntire

Personal details
- Born: October 28, 1844 near Millersburg, Ohio, U.S.
- Died: April 26, 1904 (aged 59) Chicago, Illinois, U.S.
- Resting place: Oak Hill Cemetery; Millersburg, Ohio, U.S.
- Party: Democratic
- Spouse: Helen Woods
- Children: 1
- Education: Jefferson College
- Alma mater: Princeton College; University of Michigan Law School
- Occupation: Politician; lawyer; railroad executive; educator

John Kissig Cowen (October 28, 1844 – April 26, 1904) was a U.S. representative from Maryland, representing the 4th district from 1895 to 1896. He was president of the Baltimore and Ohio Railroad from 1896 to 1901.

== Early life ==
John Kissig Cowen was born on October 28, 1844, near Millersburg, Ohio. His parents were born in Pennsylvania and his father was a blacksmith who learned the practice in Rising Sun, Maryland. Cowen attended the public schools and the local academies, including Vermillion Institute, at Fredericksburg and Hayesville, Ohio. Cowen taught school from 1862 to 1863 in Millersburg.

In 1863, Cowen attended Jefferson College, but left due to illness. He graduated from Princeton College in 1866. At Princeton, he met Robert Garrett, whose friendship would be instrumental in Cowen's life. In 1866, he taught at a high school in Millersburg. He then attended the University of Michigan Law School for one year. He was admitted to the bar of Ohio in 1868.

== Career ==
Cowen commenced practice in Mansfield, Ohio, including service as prosecuting attorney of Holmes County. He practiced law there until 1872.

Cowen moved to Baltimore, Maryland, in February 1872, following a message from his friend Garrett. He was appointed counsel of the Baltimore and Ohio Railroad, serving in that role from 1872 to 1876. From 1876 to 1896 he served as the general counsel. He was elected as a Democrat to the Fifty-fourth Congress, representing the 4th district, succeeding Isidor Rayner. He served from March 4, 1895, to March 3, 1897, but was not a candidate for renomination in 1896. He resigned to accept a role with the Baltimore and Ohio Railroad. He was a member of the committee on banking and currency, and was working on a plan to reorganize the nation's treasury when he resigned.

In January 1896, Cowen was chosen to be president of the Baltimore and Ohio Railroad, succeeding Charles F. Mayer. He held the position until June 1901.

== Personal life ==
Cowen married Helen Woods. They had one daughter, Sara C.

In 1903, Cowen traveled to Mexico with Admiral Winfield Scott Schley, James K. Jones, Matthew Butler and Eugene Davis. Cowen died on April 25, 1904, at the home of his sister in Chicago, Illinois. He was interred in Oak Hill Cemetery in his hometown of Millersburg.

== See also ==
- List of railroad executives

U.S. House of Representatives
Preceded by Isidor Rayner	Member of the U.S. House of Representatives from Maryland's 4th congressional district 1895–1897	Succeeded by William Watson McIntire
