= George Hyde Fallon =

American politician (1902–1980)

George Fallon
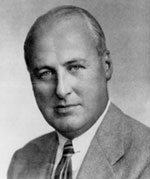

Member of the U.S. House of Representatives from Maryland's 4th district
- In office January 3, 1945 – January 3, 1971
- Preceded by: Daniel Ellison
- Succeeded by: Paul Sarbanes

Personal details
- Born: George Hyde Fallon; July 24, 1902 Baltimore, Maryland, U.S.
- Died: March 21, 1980 (aged 77) Baltimore, Maryland, U.S.
- Resting place: Green Mount Cemetery
- Party: Democratic
- Education: Calvert Business College; Johns Hopkins University

George Hyde Fallon (July 24, 1902 – March 21, 1980), a Democrat, was a U.S. congressman who represented the 4th congressional district of Maryland from January 3, 1945, to January 3, 1971. Until Steny Hoyer's reelection in 2007, Fallon held the position's longevity record.

== Biography ==
Growing up, Fallon attended public schools, Calvert Business College, and Johns Hopkins University. He engaged in the advertising sign business and made his entry into politics by becoming chairman of the Democratic state central committee of Baltimore, Maryland, in 1938.

He was elected to the Baltimore City Council from the third council district, serving from May 1939 to December 1944 when he resigned to take office as a Congressman. In 1944, he won election as a Democrat to the Seventy-ninth and to the twelve succeeding congresses, serving from January 3, 1945, to January 3, 1971. While in congress, Fallon was chairman of the Committee on Public Works from the 89th through 91st Congresses. Fallon was also one of the congressmen wounded during the 1954 United States Capitol shooting. Fallon did not sign the 1956 Southern Manifesto, and voted in favor of the Civil Rights Acts of 1957, 1960, 1964, and 1968, as well as the 24th Amendment to the U.S. Constitution and the Voting Rights Act of 1965. Fallon had a mostly voting liberal voting record during his time in Congress.

Fallon was an unsuccessful candidate for renomination in 1970 to the Ninety-second Congress after being labeled by conservationists as one of the dirty dozen for his record as the twelfth most anti-environmental congressman at that time. Fallon retired to Baltimore, where he died in 1980. He is interred in Green Mount Cemetery.

He was also the primary sponsor of the Federal Aid Highway Act of 1956.

In January 1971, Public Law 91-653 officially designated the Federal building in Baltimore as the "George H. Fallon Federal Office Building."

== See also ==
- List of members of the United States Congress killed or wounded in office

U.S. House of Representatives
Preceded by Daniel Ellison	Member of the U.S. House of Representatives from Maryland's 4th congressional district 1945–1971	Succeeded by Paul Sarbanes
Preceded by Charles A. Buckley	Chair of the House Public Works Committee; 1965–1971	Succeeded by John Blatnik
