= James William Denny =

American politician

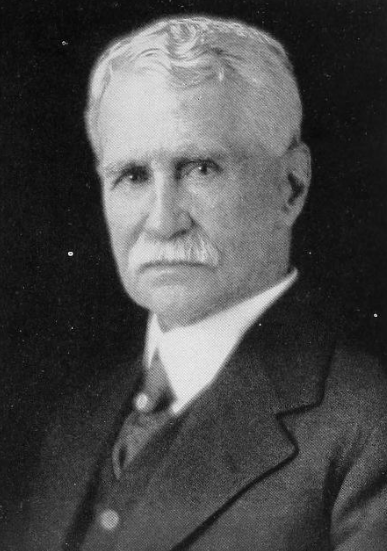

Member of the U.S. House of Representatives from Maryland's 4th district
- In office March 4, 1899 – March 3, 1901
- Preceded by: William W. McIntire
- Succeeded by: Charles Reginald Schirm
- In office March 4, 1903 – March 3, 1905
- Preceded by: Charles Reginald Schirm
- Succeeded by: John Gill Jr.

Member of the Maryland House of Delegates
- In office 1888–1890

Personal details
- Born: November 20, 1838 Frederick County, Virginia, U.S.
- Died: April 12, 1923 (aged 84) Baltimore, Maryland, U.S.
- Resting place: Loudon Park Cemetery
- Party: Democratic
- Education: University of Virginia at Charlottesville
- Occupation: Lawyer

Military service
- Allegiance: Confederate States of America
- Branch/service: Confederate States Army
- Unit: 39th Virginia Battalion of Cavalry
- Battles/wars: American Civil War

James William Denny (November 20, 1838 – April 12, 1923) was a U.S. representative from Maryland.

== Early life ==
James William Denny was born on November 20, 1838, in Frederick County, Virginia. Denny attended the academy of the Rev. William Johnson in Berryville, Virginia and graduated from the University of Virginia at Charlottesville.

== Career ==
He served as principal of the Osage Seminary of Osceola, Missouri. During the Civil War, he returned to his native state and enlisted in Company A, thirty-ninth Virginia Battalion of Cavalry in the Confederate States Army. He served until 1863 when he was detailed for service at General Robert E. Lee's headquarters, where he continued until the surrender at Appomattox Court House. After the war, he returned to Clarke County, Virginia, and graduated from Judge Parker's Law School in Winchester. He moved to Baltimore, Maryland in 1867. He was admitted to the bar in Baltimore in 1868, and commenced practice there.

Denny was elected to the first branch of the Baltimore City Council in 1881, was reelected in 1882, and later became its president. He also served in the Maryland House of Delegates from 1888 to 1890, as colonel on the staff of Gov. Elihu Emory Jackson and as member of the Baltimore School Board for eight years.

Denny was elected as a Democrat to the fifty-sixth congress (March 4, 1899 – March 3, 1901), but was an unsuccessful candidate for reelection in 1900 to the fifty-seventh congress. He later was elected to the fifty-eighth congress (March 4, 1903 – March 3, 1905). He engaged in the practice of law until his death.

== Personal life ==
Denny died on April 12, 1923, in Baltimore. He is interred in Loudon Park Cemetery.

U.S. House of Representatives
Preceded by William Watson McIntire	Member of the U.S. House of Representatives from Maryland's 4th congressional district 1899–1901	Succeeded by Charles Reginald Schirm
Preceded by Charles Reginald Schirm	Member of the U.S. House of Representatives from Maryland's 4th congressional district 1903–1905	Succeeded by John Gill Jr.
