= William Smith (Maryland politician) =

American politician (1728–1814)

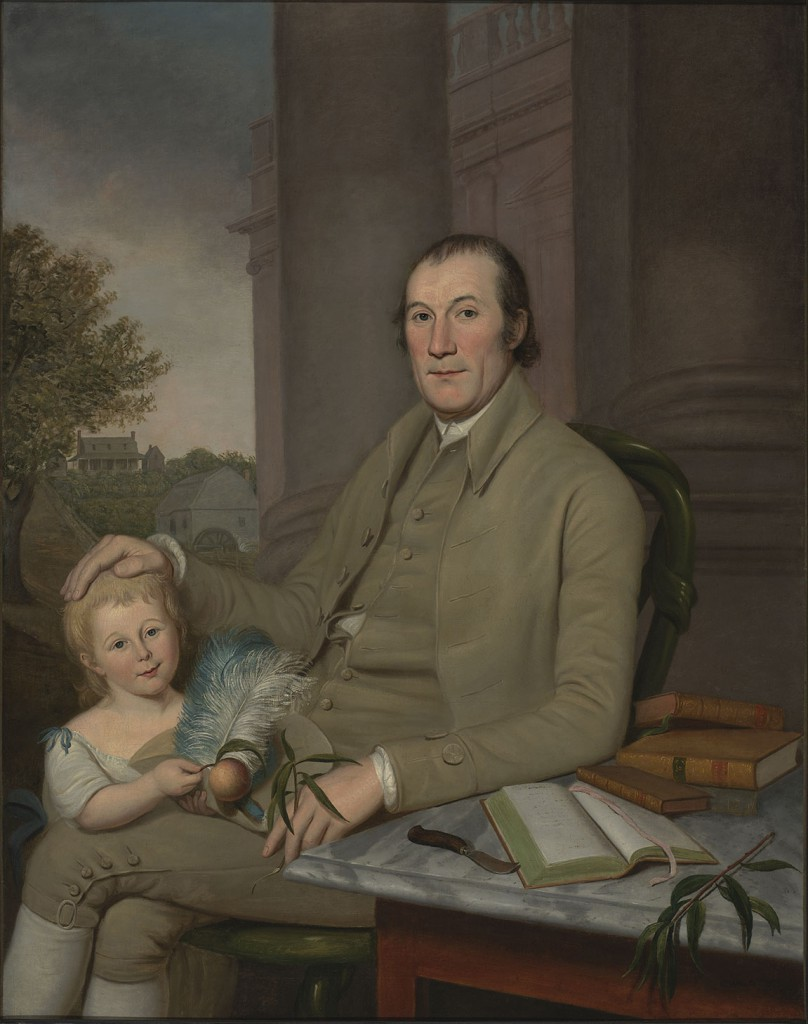
- Smith and grandson Robert Smith Williams, portrait by Charles Willson Peale

Member of the U.S. House of Representatives from Maryland's 4th district
- In office March 4, 1789 – March 3, 1791
- Preceded by: District established
- Succeeded by: Samuel Sterett

Personal details
- Born: April 12, 1728 Donegal Township, Province of Pennsylvania, British America
- Died: March 27, 1814 (aged 85) Baltimore, Maryland, U.S.
- Party: Anti-Administration

William Smith (April 12, 1728 – March 27, 1814) was an American politician and representative of the fourth congressional district of Maryland in the United States House of Representatives.

== Formative years and family ==
Born on April 12, 1728, in the Province of Pennsylvania in what is now Donegal Township in Lancaster County. His father was Samuel Smith (1695-1784) and the family included an elder brother, John Smith (1723-1794), whose sons Samuel and Robert would also become important politicians in Maryland. The Smith family moved to Baltimore, Maryland in 1761.

Smith's daughter, Mary Smith, later married General Otho Holland Williams, the founder of Williamsport, Maryland.

== Career ==
Appointed to the committee of correspondence in 1774 and to the committee of observation in 1775, Smith also served in the Revolutionary War as deputy adjutant general to Generals Horatio Gates and Nathanael Greene.

In 1777, Smith was appointed by the Continental Congress to the naval board. That same year, Smith was chosen as a Maryland delegate to the Continental Congress.

He subsequently pursued a career as a merchant, and was then elected to the 1st United States Congress, serving in that capacity from March 4, 1789, until March 3, 1791.

Smith was subsequently appointed as the first auditor of the United States Treasury, and served in that post from July 16, 1791, to November 27, 1791. He then returned to local politics and was elected to the Maryland Senate in 1801.

== Death and interment ==
Smith died in Baltimore and was interred in the Old Westminster Graveyard, as had been his father.

== Gallery ==
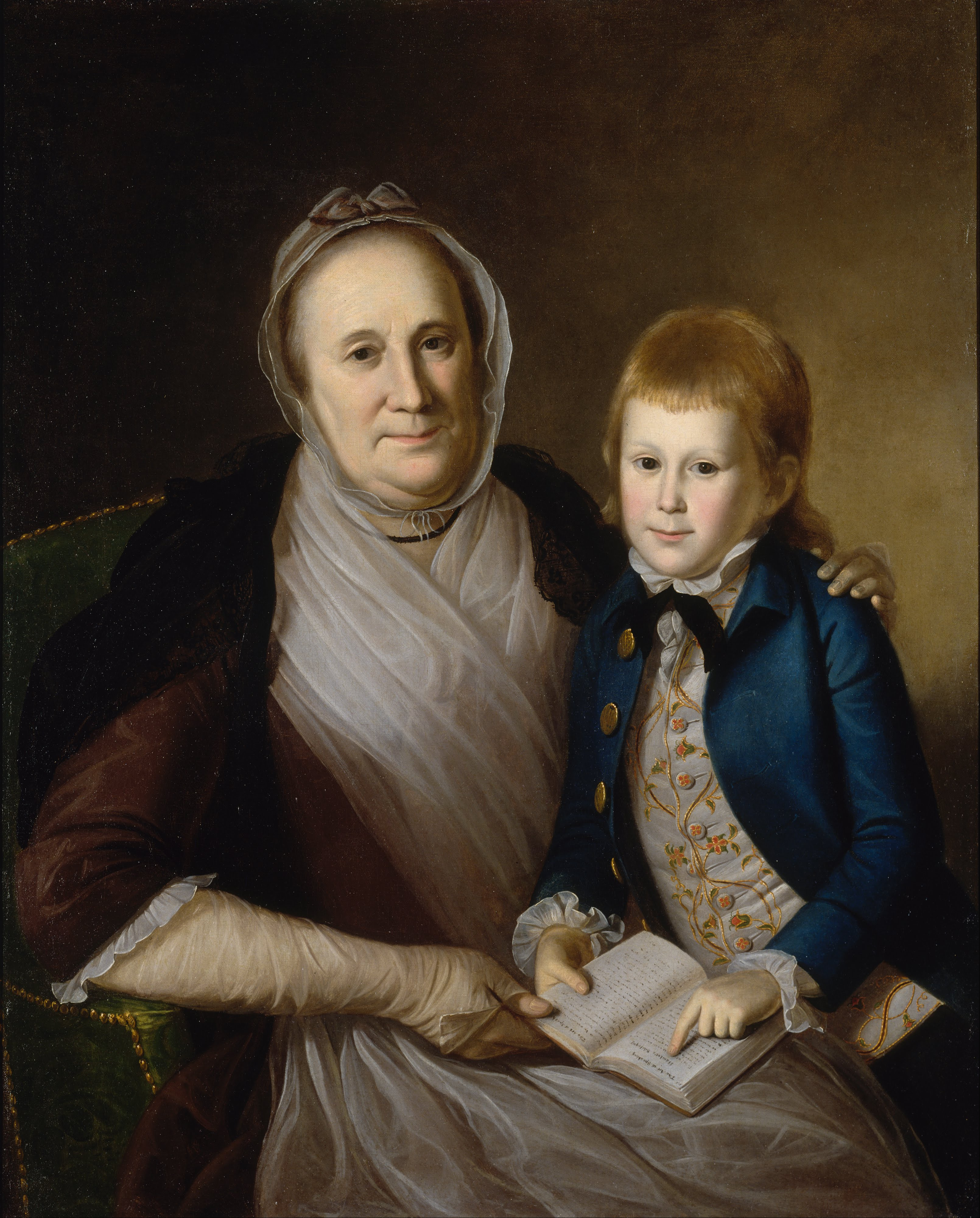
Mrs. James Smith and Grandson, a 1776 portrait by Charles Willson Peale of Smith's mother Mary and his son Campbell.

U.S. House of Representatives
Preceded by Seat created	Member of the U.S. House of Representatives from Maryland's 4th congressional district 1789–1791	Succeeded by Samuel Sterett
