= J. Charles Linthicum =

American politician (1867–1932)

John Charles Linthicum
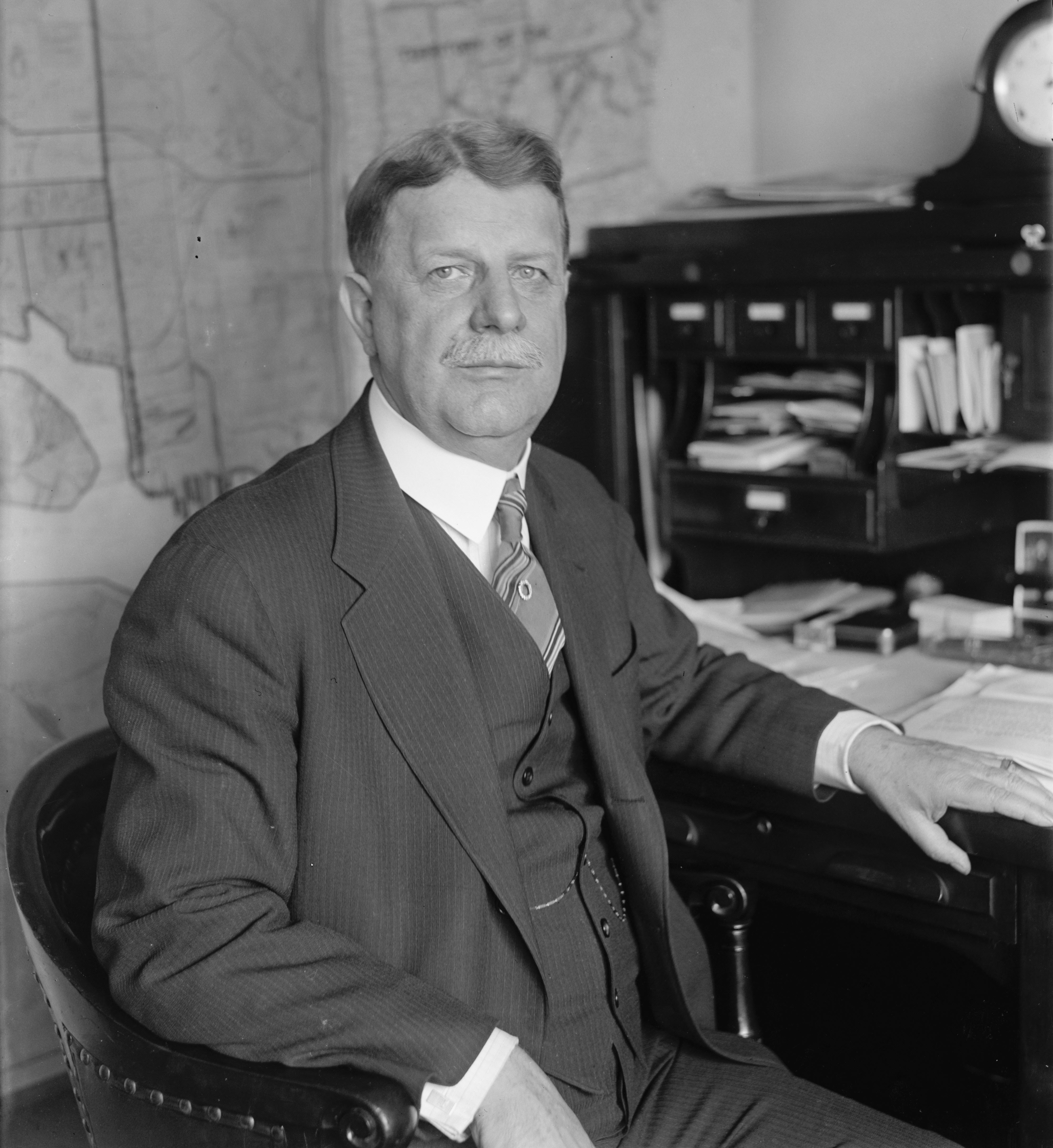

Member of the U.S. House of Representatives from Maryland's 4th district
- In office March 4, 1911 – October 5, 1932
- Preceded by: John Gill, Jr.
- Succeeded by: Ambrose J. Kennedy

Member of the Maryland Senate
- In office 1906-1909

Member of the Maryland House of Delegates from the 3rd district
- In office 1904–1906 Serving with Charles J. Bouchet, James A. Dawkins, James O. Durham, Charles W. Grant, George W. Moore
- Preceded by: New district
- Succeeded by: Charles J. Bouchet, James A. Dawkins, Harry E. Banks, Frederick T. Dorton, Martin Lehmayer, T. Leigh Marriott

Personal details
- Born: November 26, 1867 near Baltimore, Maryland, U.S.
- Died: October 5, 1932 (aged 64) Linthicum, Maryland, U.S.
- Resting place: Druid Ridge Cemetery
- Party: Democratic
- Spouse(s): Eugenia May Biden; Helen Aletta Perry

John Charles Linthicum (November 26, 1867–October 5, 1932) was a U.S. congressman from the 4th congressional district of Maryland, serving from 1911 to 1932.

== Biography ==
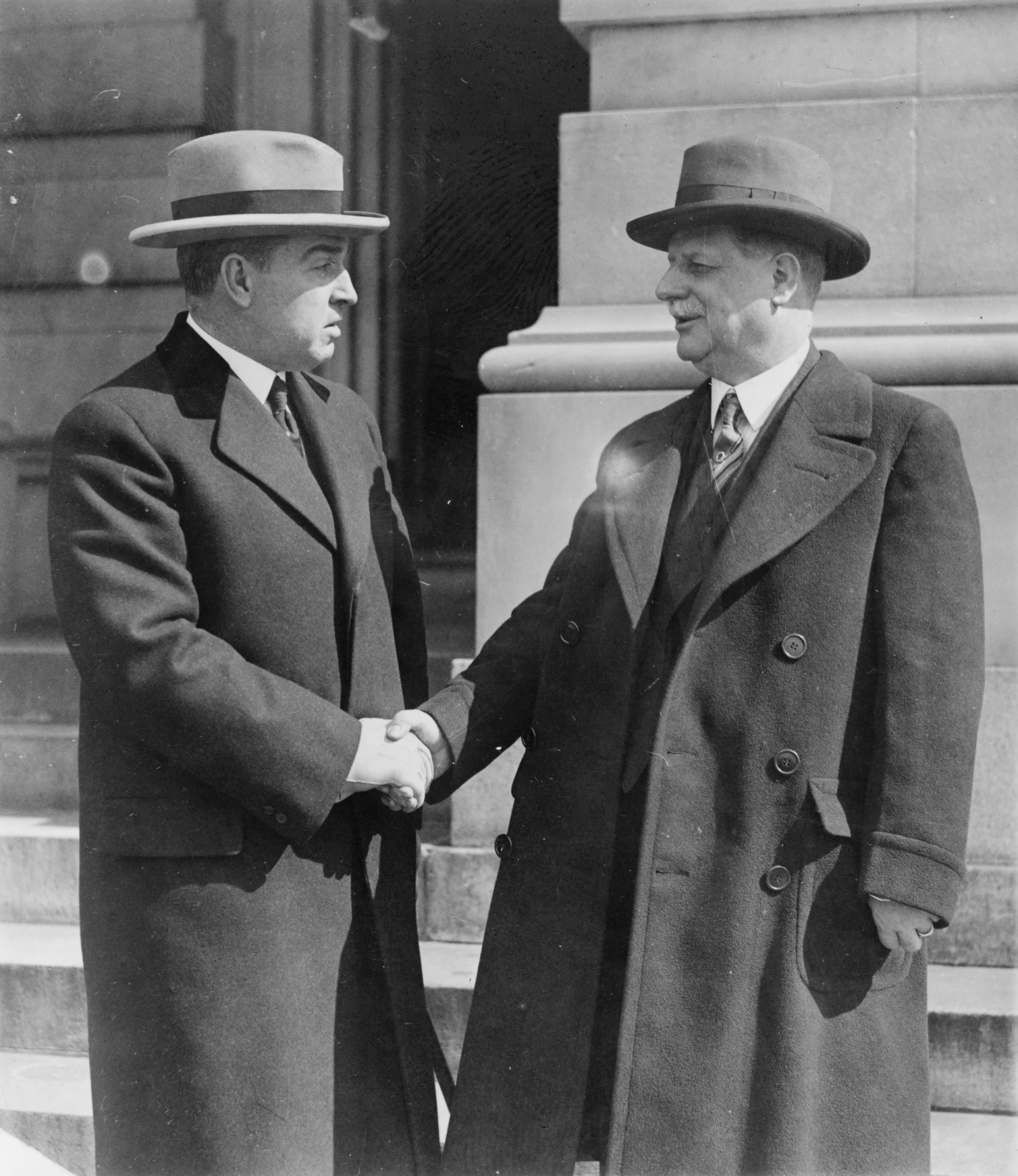
Linthicum (right) with colleague John Hill.

Linthicum was born on 26 November 1867 near Baltimore, Maryland, in the locality now known as Linthicum Heights, Anne Arundel County, the son of Sweetser Linthicum Sr. (1824–1905) and Laura Ellen Smith (1829–1910). He and his many siblings attended the public schools of Anne Arundel County and Baltimore.

He graduated from the Maryland State Normal School in Baltimore in 1886, and became principal of the Braddock School in Frederick County, Maryland, in 1887. He also taught in the schools of Anne Arundel County, and studied history and political science at Johns Hopkins University in Baltimore. He graduated from the law school at the University of Maryland School of Law in Baltimore in 1890, and was admitted to the bar and commenced practice in Baltimore in 1890.

In 1893 he married Eugenia May Biden but she died in 1897. In 1898, he married at Emmanuel Protestant Episcopal Church of Baltimore as his second wife Helen Aletta Perry (1868–1944), widow of wealthy jeweler Gilbert D. Clark (d. 8 Dec 1896) and daughter of a prominent medical doctor.

By 1900, his younger brother Seth Hance Linthicum was the junior partner in their growing law firm, while both were partners with their younger brother Wade Hampton Linthicum in the Linthicum Realty Company, and with their brother Dr. George Milton Linthicum in the Linthicum Heights Company.

Linthicum served as a member of the Maryland House of Delegates, representing district 3, from 1904 to 1906. He served in the Maryland State Senate from 1906 to 1909. He was an unsuccessful candidate for mayor of Baltimore in 1907, and was a judge advocate general on the staff of Maryland Governor Austin Lane Crothers from 1908 to 1912.

He was elected as a Democrat to the Sixty-second and to the ten succeeding Congresses and served from March 4, 1911, until his death. Linthicum's most important role in Congress was that of the leader of the Wets (those who advocated the repeal of alcohol prohibition), succeeding John Philip Hill in 1927. Working with Republican James M. Beck of Pennsylvania, Linthicum co-wrote and in 1932 introduced the Beck-Linthicum Bill which was designed to repeal the 18th Amendment. Although the bill failed, it is highly significant in that it forced the wet and dry members to go on record as such, which aided the Women's Organization for National Prohibition Reform and other repeal organizations. This resulted in the drys being voted out of office and the eventual repeal of prohibition.

Linthicum advocated for the United States to join the Permanent Court of International Justice.

In June 1917, John Charles Linthicum Jr., born John Charles Dillon, orphaned nephew of his wife who became their foster son, died while a student boarding at Tome School.

In 1918, Linthicum was motivated by his wife Helen, a noted "club woman", and by Ella Virginia Houck Holloway, to become the first to introduce a bill which would make the Star Spangled Banner the official national anthem of the United States, though it was not made so until 1931. During the Seventy-second Congress, he served as chairman of the U.S. House Committee on Foreign Affairs, and had been renominated to the Seventy-third Congress at the time of his death. While serving as chairman of the Committee on Foreign Affairs, Linthicum co-sponsored the Moses-Linthicum Act, achieved the "scheduling" of the foreign service and instituted the policy of U.S. government ownership of its embassies. Linthicum had also served as a delegate to the Democratic National Convention in 1924.

== Legacy ==
His home, Twin Oaks, was listed on the National Register of Historic Places in 1986.

Several memorials have been dedicated to John Charles Linthicum.

1. Grave Marker in Druid Ridge Park- By his wife Helen recognizing service to the U.S. State Department.
2. Stained Glass Window- Church of the Ephiphany Washington D.C.
3. Linthicum Memorial and Park, Linthicum, Maryland, commemorating his work on behalf of the National Anthem.

== See also ==
- List of members of the United States Congress who died in office (1900–1949)

== Notes ==
U.S. House of Representatives
Preceded by John Gill, Jr.	Member of the U.S. House of Representatives from Maryland's 4th congressional district 1911–1932	Succeeded by Ambrose J. Kennedy
