= George M. Gill =

American lawyer and politician (1803–1887)

- Born: George Murray Gill; February 15, 1803; Baltimore, Maryland, U.S.
- Died: November 18, 1887 (aged 84); Baltimore, Maryland, U.S.
- Resting place: Green Mount Cemetery
- Political party: Whig; Democratic
- Spouses: Ann W. McElderry (m. 1830, died) Ann McKim Bowley (m. 1837)
- Children: 9, including John Gill Jr.

George Murray Gill (February 15, 1803 – November 18, 1887) was an American attorney, businessman, and politician who represented John Merryman in the habeas corpus case Ex parte Merryman (1861).

== Early life ==
George Murray Gill was born on February 15, 1803, in Baltimore, Maryland, to John Gill. He graduated from St. Mary's Seminary in Baltimore, then studied law and was admitted to the bar in 1823.

== Career ==
Gill practiced law in Baltimore and Harford counties and then in the city of Baltimore. He was a member of the Whig Party until he became a Democrat in the 1850s serving on the Baltimore City Council.

Gill represented John Merryman in his habeas corpus case in 1861 after his detention due to Lincoln's suspension of habeas corpus. Later in life Gill served as a director of the Western Maryland Railroad and Northern Central Railroad and continued to practice law. He was a member of Franklin Street Presbyterian Church.

== Personal life ==
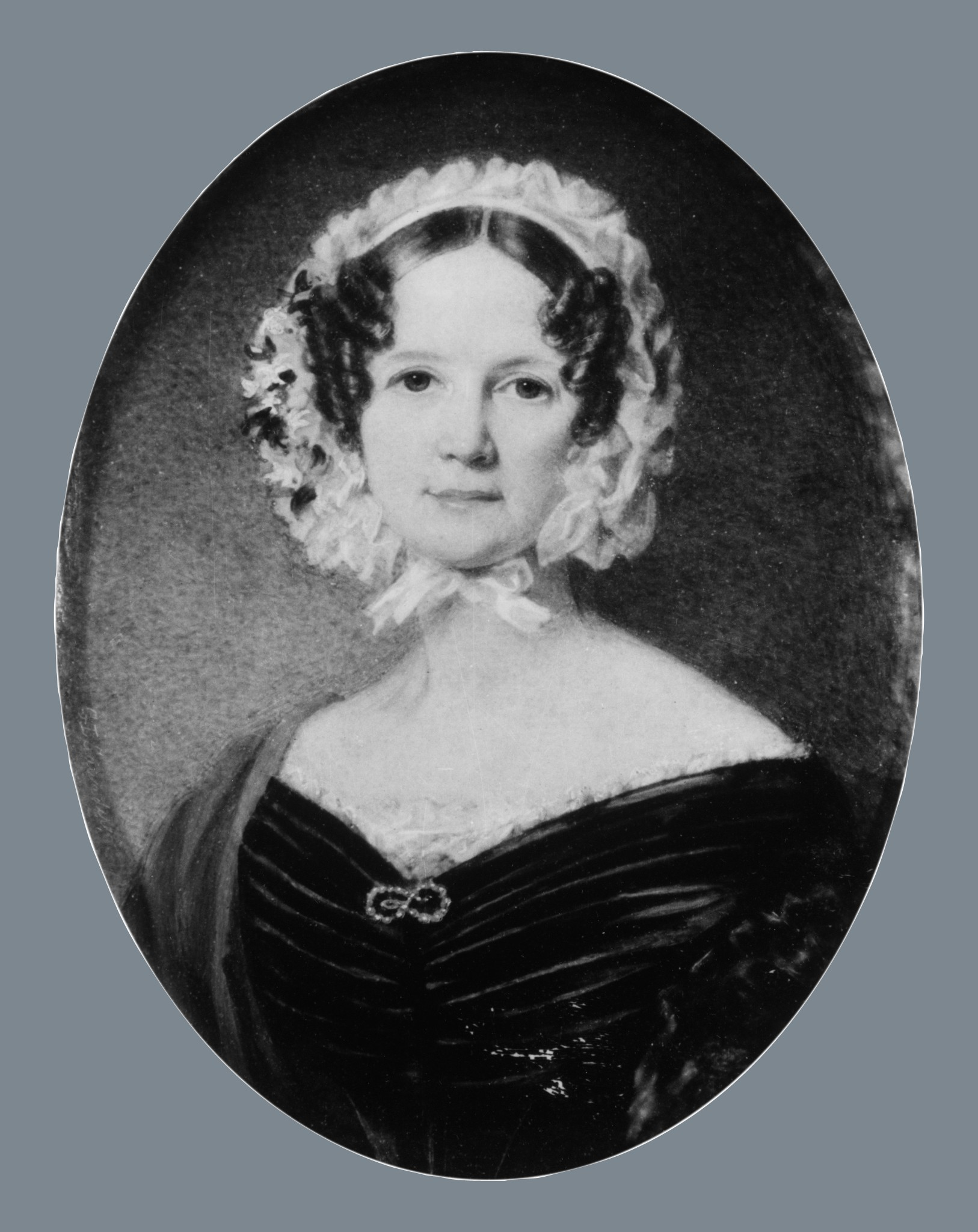
Portrait of Ann McKim Bowly (1841) by George Lethbridge Saunders

Gill married Ann W. McElderry in 1830. Together, they had two children, Elizabeth and Ann. She died. Gill married Ann McKim Bowly in 1837. Together, they had seven children: John Gill Jr., George, Mary, Esther, Anna, Theresa and Fannie.

== Death ==
Gill died on November 18, 1887, in Baltimore and was buried at Green Mount Cemetery.
