= George Lethbridge Saunders =

English painter

- Born: 1807; Bristol, England
- Died: 1863 (aged 55–56); Bristol, England
- Occupation: Painter

George Lethbridge Saunders (1807–1863) was an English painter.

== Biography ==
=== Early life ===
George Lethbridge Saunders was born in 1807 in Bristol, England.

=== Career ===
He became a renowned painter of portraits and miniatures in England, exhibiting at the Royal Academy of Arts from 1829 to 1839 and the Free Society of British Artists from 1851 to 1853. By 1840, he moved to the United States, where he exhibited his work at the Apollo Association in New York City and the Artists' Fund Society in Philadelphia from 1840 to 1843. He also worked in Boston, Baltimore, Richmond, Savannah, Columbia and Charleston. During his time in the American South, he did portraits of Confederate politicians and generals as well as members of wealthy families like John Carnan Ridgely (1790–1867) of the Hampton plantation or Charles S. Gilmore (1817–1866) of Baltimore. He returned to England in 1851.

His portrait of Confederate President Jefferson Davis (1808–1889) is exhibited at the National Portrait Gallery in Washington, D.C.. His portraits of composer Johann Baptist Cramer (1771–1858) and novelist Matthew Gregory Lewis (1775–1818) can be found in the Metropolitan Museum of Art in New York City. As for the National Portrait Gallery in London, it houses his portraits of the wives of lawyer George M. Gill (1803–1887) and merchant Israel Thorndike (1755–1832) as well as Confederate General Jubal Anderson Early (1816–1894). His portrait of Southern planter Alexander Telfair (1789–1832) is exhibited in the Telfair Museum of Art in Savannah, Georgia. As for his portrait of Benjamin Chew Wilcocks (1776–1845), it is exhibited in the Philadelphia Museum of Art in Philadelphia, Pennsylvania. Another painting, this time a Biblical scene entitled Adam Tempted by Eve, is exhibited in the Detroit Institute of Arts in Detroit, Michigan.

=== Death ===
He died in Bristol in 1863.

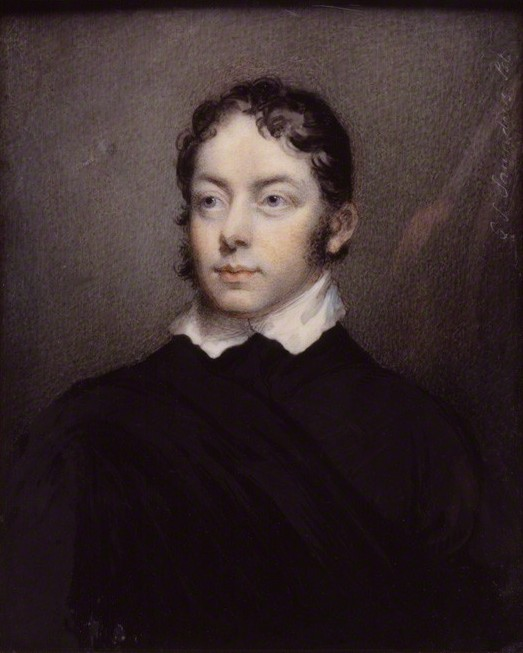
Portrait of Matthew Gregory Lewis by George Lethbridge Saunders in the National Portrait Gallery in London, 1800

== Selected paintings ==
- Matthew Gregory Lewis (National Portrait Gallery, London; 1800).
- Johann Baptist Cramer (National Portrait Gallery, London; 1827).
- Adam Tempted by Eve (Detroit Institute of Arts, Detroit, Michigan; 1836).
- Mrs. George M. Gill (Ann McKim Bowly) (Metropolitan Museum of Art, New York City; 1841).
- Portrait of Benjamin Chew Wilcocks (Philadelphia Museum of Art, Philadelphia, Pennsylvania; 1842).
- Mrs. Israel Thorndike (Sarah Dana) (Metropolitan Museum of Art, New York City; 1843).
- Jubal Anderson Early (Metropolitan Museum of Art, New York City; 1847-1848).
- Portrait of a Gentleman (Metropolitan Museum of Art, New York City; 1845-1850).
- Alexander Telfair (Telfair Museum of Art, Savannah, Georgia, 1848).
- Jefferson Davis (National Portrait Gallery, Washington, D.C.; 1949).
