= Charles Reginald Schirm =

American politician

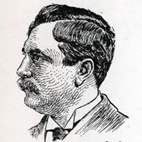

Member of the U.S. House of Representatives from Maryland's 4th district
- In office March 4, 1901 – March 3, 1903
- Preceded by: James William Denny
- Succeeded by: James William Denny

Member of the Maryland House of Delegates
- In office 1898–1900

Personal details
- Born: August 12, 1864 Baltimore, Maryland, U.S.
- Died: November 2, 1918 (aged 54) Baltimore, Maryland, U.S.
- Resting place: Loudon Park Cemetery, Baltimore, Maryland, U.S.
- Party: Republican
- Spouse: Annie Maude Charlton (m. 1891)
- Education: Washington & Jefferson College
- Profession: Politician, lawyer

Charles Reginald Schirm (August 12, 1864 – November 2, 1918) was a U.S. Representative from Maryland.

Born in Baltimore, Maryland to German immigrants, Schirm attended the public schools. He commenced, but did not complete, an apprenticeship in iron molding, and attended Washington & Jefferson College in Washington, Pennsylvania. He went on to teach school in Pennsylvania and Maryland. He studied law, was admitted to the Baltimore County bar in 1896, and practiced law.

He served as a member of the Maryland House of Delegates from 1898 to 1900, and as counsel to the board of police commissioners of the city of Baltimore in 1899 and 1900.

Schirm was elected as a Republican to the Fifty-seventh Congress (March 4, 1901 – March 3, 1903), but was an unsuccessful candidate for reelection in 1902 to the Fifty-eighth Congress. He later served as a delegate to the Bull Moose National Convention in 1912 and continued the practice of law in Baltimore until his death. He is interred in Loudon Park Cemetery.

== Personal life ==
On March 8, 1891, Schirm married Annie Maude Charlton in Lily Dale, New York.

U.S. House of Representatives
| Preceded by James William Denny | Member of the U.S. House of Representatives from Maryland's 4th congressional district 1901–1903 | Succeeded by James William Denny |
