= John Gill Jr. =

American politician and judge

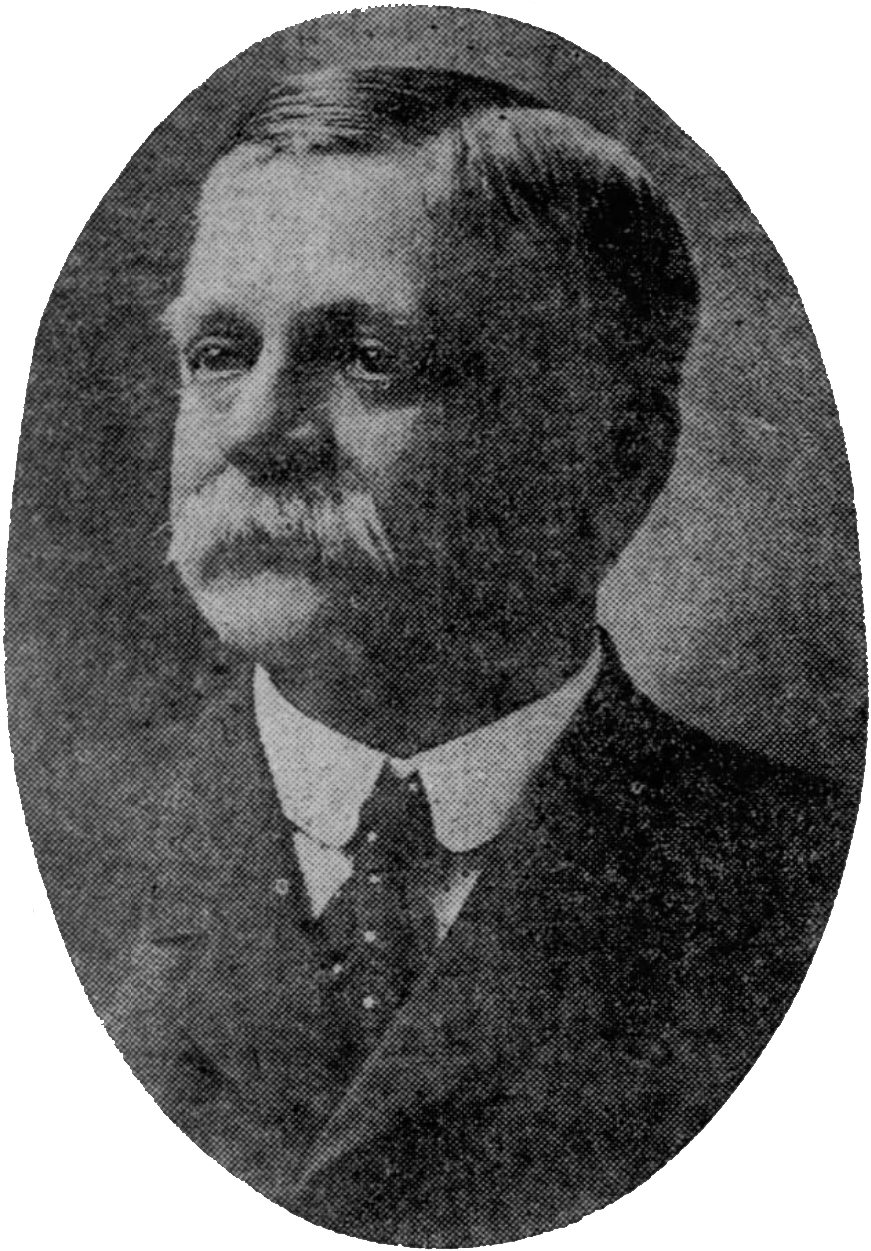
- Gill in 1911 newspaper

Member of the U.S. House of Representatives from Maryland's 4th district
- In office March 4, 1905 – March 3, 1911
- Preceded by: James William Denny
- Succeeded by: John Charles Linthicum

Member of Maryland State Senate
- In office 1882–1886, 1904–1905

Member of Maryland House of Delegates
- In office 1874–1877

Personal details
- Born: June 9, 1850 Baltimore, Maryland, U.S.
- Died: January 27, 1918 (aged 67) Baltimore, Maryland, U.S.
- Party: Democratic
- Spouse: Nannie Kremelberg
- Parent: George M. Gill (father)
- Education: University of Maryland at Baltimore

John Gill Jr. (June 9, 1850 – January 27, 1918) was a U.S. representative from Maryland. He also served as a judge in Baltimore and on the Maryland House of Delegates and Maryland State Senate.

== Early life ==
John Gill Jr. was born on June 9, 1850, in Baltimore, Maryland, to Ann McKim (née Bowly) and George M. Gill. Gill attended Hampden-Sydney College of Virginia, and also graduated from the University of Maryland at Baltimore in 1870. He studied law, was admitted to the bar in 1871, and commenced practice in Baltimore.

== Career ==
Gill was a partner in the firm of Gill, Preston & Field with Baltimore Mayor James H. Preston.

Gill served as member of the Maryland House of Delegates from 1874 to 1877, and as examiner of titles in the Baltimore city legal department from 1879 to 1884. He won election to the Maryland State Senate multiple times, and served from 1882 to 1886, and again in 1904 and 1905. He also served as delegate to the Democratic National Conventions in 1884, 1888, and 1892, and was a member of the Baltimore Police Department Board of Commissioners from 1888 to 1897.

Gill was elected as a Democrat to the Fifty-ninth, Sixtieth, and Sixty-first Congresses (March 4, 1905 – March 3, 1911), but was not a candidate for reelection in 1910. He served as judge of the appeal tax court of the city of Baltimore from 1912 to 1918, where he died.

== Personal life ==
Gill married Nannie Kremelberg, daughter of J.D. Kremelberg. Her father was a member of the Austrian Consulate in Baltimore.

== Death ==
Gill died in Baltimore on January 27, 1918. He was cremated.

U.S. House of Representatives
Preceded by James William Denny	Member of the U.S. House of Representatives from Maryland's 4th congressional district 1905–1911	Succeeded by John Charles Linthicum
