= John Ambrose Meyer =

American politician (1899–1969)

Member of the U.S. House of Representatives from Maryland's 4th district
- In office January 3, 1941 – January 3, 1943
- Preceded by: Ambrose Jerome Kennedy
- Succeeded by: Daniel Ellison

Personal details
- Born: May 15, 1899 Baltimore, Maryland, U.S.
- Died: October 2, 1969 (aged 70) Baltimore, Maryland, U.S.
- Resting place: Holy Cross Cemetery
- Party: Democratic
- Education: Loyola College in Maryland; University of Maryland School of Law
- Profession: Politician, lawyer

Military service
- Allegiance: United States
- Branch/service: United States Army
- Battles/wars: World War I

John Ambrose Meyer (May 15, 1899 – October 2, 1969) was a U.S. representative from Maryland.

== Biography ==
Born in Baltimore, Maryland, Meyer attended the grade schools and Loyola High School. During the First World War, he enlisted as a private in the Students' Army Training Corps at Georgetown University, Washington, D.C., and served until honorably discharged from the United States Army. He was graduated from Loyola College of Baltimore in 1921, and from the University of Maryland School of Law of Baltimore in 1922. He was admitted to the bar in 1921 and commenced practice in Baltimore. He served as associate judge of the traffic court of Baltimore from 1929 to 1935, and as special assistant city solicitor in 1939 and 1940.

Meyer was elected as a Democrat to the Seventy-seventh Congress (January 3, 1941 – January 3, 1943), but was an unsuccessful candidate for renomination in 1942. He served as district rent attorney for the Office of Price Administration during the Second World War. He engaged in the general practice of law in Baltimore, Maryland, until his death there on October 2, 1969. He is interred in Holy Cross Cemetery.

U.S. House of Representatives
Preceded by Ambrose Jerome Kennedy	Member of the U.S. House of Representatives from Maryland's 4th congressional district 1941–1943	Succeeded by Daniel Ellison
