= James O. Durham =

American politician (born 1864)

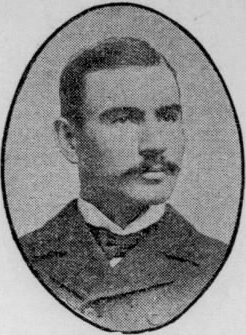
- Durham in a 1903 newspaper

Member of the Maryland House of Delegates from the 3rd district
- In office 1904–1906 Serving with Charles J. Bouchet, James A. Dawkins, Charles W. Grant, J. Charles Linthicum, George W. Moore
- Preceded by: New district
- Succeeded by: Charles J. Bouchet, James A. Dawkins, Harry E. Banks, Frederick T. Dorton, Martin Lehmayer, T. Leigh Marriott

Personal details
- Born: October 15, 1864 Baltimore County, Maryland, U.S.
- Party: Democratic
- Children: 1
- Occupation: Politician; plumber; steel worker

James O. Durham (born October 15, 1864) was an American politician from Maryland. He served in the Maryland House of Delegates from 1904 to 1906.

== Early life ==
James O. Durham was born on October 15, 1864, in Baltimore County, Maryland, to John L. Durham. His father was a miller. He attended public schools.

== Career ==
Durham worked as a plumber and gas fitter on Frederick Road in Baltimore. He was also a steel worker.

Durham was a Democrat. He served in the Maryland House of Delegates, representing the 3rd district, from 1904 to 1906.

== Personal life ==
Durham married. They had one daughter. He lived on Millington Avenue in Baltimore.
