= C. Markland Kelly =

American politician

C. Markland Kelly (January 14, 1893 – December 29, 1965) was President of the City Council for Baltimore, Maryland (1943–1951) and owner of Kelly Buick Sales Corporation.

== Biography ==
He was born in Baltimore, Maryland on January 14, 1893, the son of Caleb John Guyer and Mary Elisabeth (Stevens) Kelly of Talbot County, Maryland. His brother Dr. C.(Caleb) Guyer Kelly, also known as the "Father of African Baseball", was a Methodist Episcopal Church lay missionary to Tunis, Tunisia. Dr. Kelly is renowned for introducing Baseball to the continent of Africa in 1921. After completing his high school education at Baltimore's Polytechnic Institute, C.(Charles) Markland Kelly attended St. John's College, Annapolis, where he excelled in Lacrosse. After graduating his first public job was as a municipal mosquito inspector. In 1916, at the age of twenty-three, he entered the automobile business as a Flivver salesman. After two years as a Ford Motor Company representative, he became a Buick salesman. On December 1, 1928, he established a business of his own under the name of Kelly Buick Sales Corporation where he adopted the motto, "Selling Honestly and Servicing Sincerely". By 1935, his business developed into one of the foremost Buick dealers in the Central Atlantic States. Then in 1941 he was elected president of the Automobile Trade Association of Maryland where he served two terms.

Kelly's only son, C. Markland Kelly, Jr., enlisted as a Naval Air Cadet while attending the University of Maryland, College Park. After attending the aviation training school at the Jacksonville Naval Air Station in Florida, he received his wings and was commissioned in August, 1941. He then was assigned to active duty on the Aircraft Carrier USS Hornet (CV-8), which was being completed at Norfolk, Virginia. On June 4, 1942, attached to the USS Hornet (CV-8) during the Battle of Midway, he and his single-seated Grumman F4F Wildcat were lost in the Pacific Ocean. In 1945, to perpetuate his son's name, Kelly, Sr. established the Ensign C. Markland Kelly, Jr. Memorial Foundation. The foundation has become a respected local institution during its sixty-five years of activity. It initiated funding of the Lacrosse Hall of Fame Foundation and presents the Ensign C. Markland Kelly, Jr. Award annually to the top college Lacrosse goaltender. Additionally, the Foundation disburses hundreds of thousands of dollars to the American Legion, schools, colleges, hospitals, clinics, youth programs, and various civic and cultural institutions in the Baltimore area.

Appointed in 1935 by Baltimore Mayor Howard W. Jackson, Kelly, Sr. served for eight years on the Park Board, first as a member, then as president. In this period he also served as chairman of the Baltimore Stadium Committee. In 1943, on the death of Tom Conlon, he was elected by the members of the Baltimore City Council to complete Mr. Conlon's four-year term as Council President. In 1947, he was the Democratic nominee to succeed himself and amassed the largest popular vote of anyone on his ticket. He served the next four years as Vice Mayor, President of the City Council, and President of the Board of Estimates. Kelly held memberships in several social organizations. He was a member of the Masonic Order, Tall Cedars of Lebanon, Loyal Order of Moose, Boumi Temple Shrine, Knights Templar, Elks, Baltimore Athletic Club, Oriole Gun Club, Gibson Island Club, Maryland Yacht Club (Past Commodore 1937), and Annapolis Yacht club. After resigning the presidency of the City Council in 1951, Kelly gradually withdrew from activities and then died in his sleep at home on December 29, 1965.
