= Mountjoy Farm =

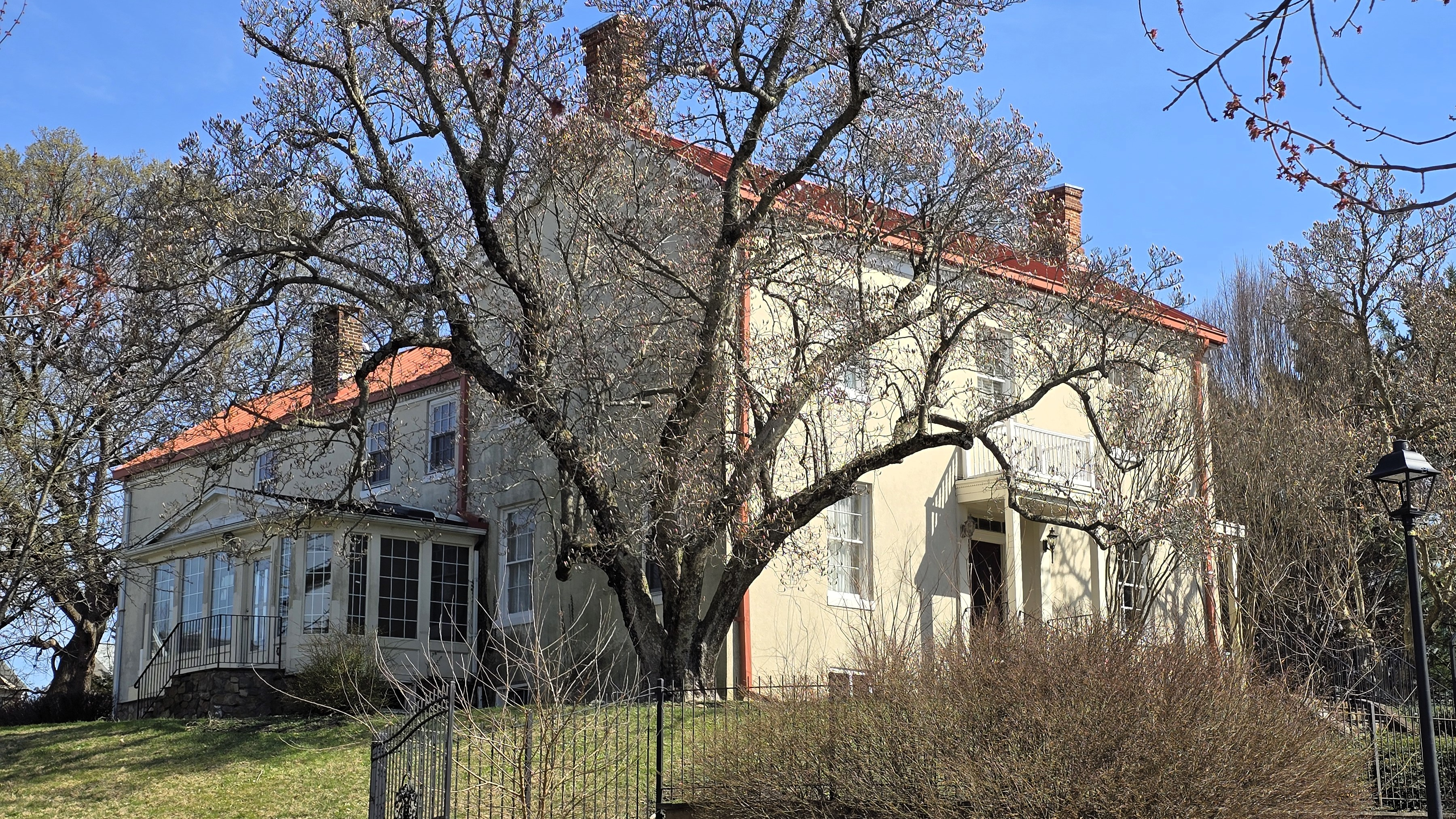
- Mount Joy in 2026

- Location within Maryland
- Interactive map of Mountjoy Farm
- 39°14′15.5″N 76°49′09″W
- Location: Ellicott City, Maryland

History
- Built: Early 19th century

Site notes
- Area: Ellicott City
- Architectural style: Greek Revival

Mount Joy (sometimes called Santa Fe) is a historic slave plantation in Ellicott City, Howard County, Maryland, which has a current address of 5000 Executive Park Drive.

The farm is located on the original land grant named Chews Resolution Manor. In 1810, Dr. Arthur Pue owned land around modern Route 100. Pue was the family doctor for the Gorman family, who Senator Arthur Pue Gorman is named after. The Pue family farmed the property with 19 slaves. In 1851, Samuel Wethered Jr. purchased 206 acres of farmland, creating "Santa Fe" from Dr. Pue. In 1912, 193 acres of the property was purchased by the Buck Family. On October 10, 1980, the estate was purchased by K&M Development Corporation (Brantly Development Group Corporation) for $532,000. In 2003, Winchester Homes purchased the site.

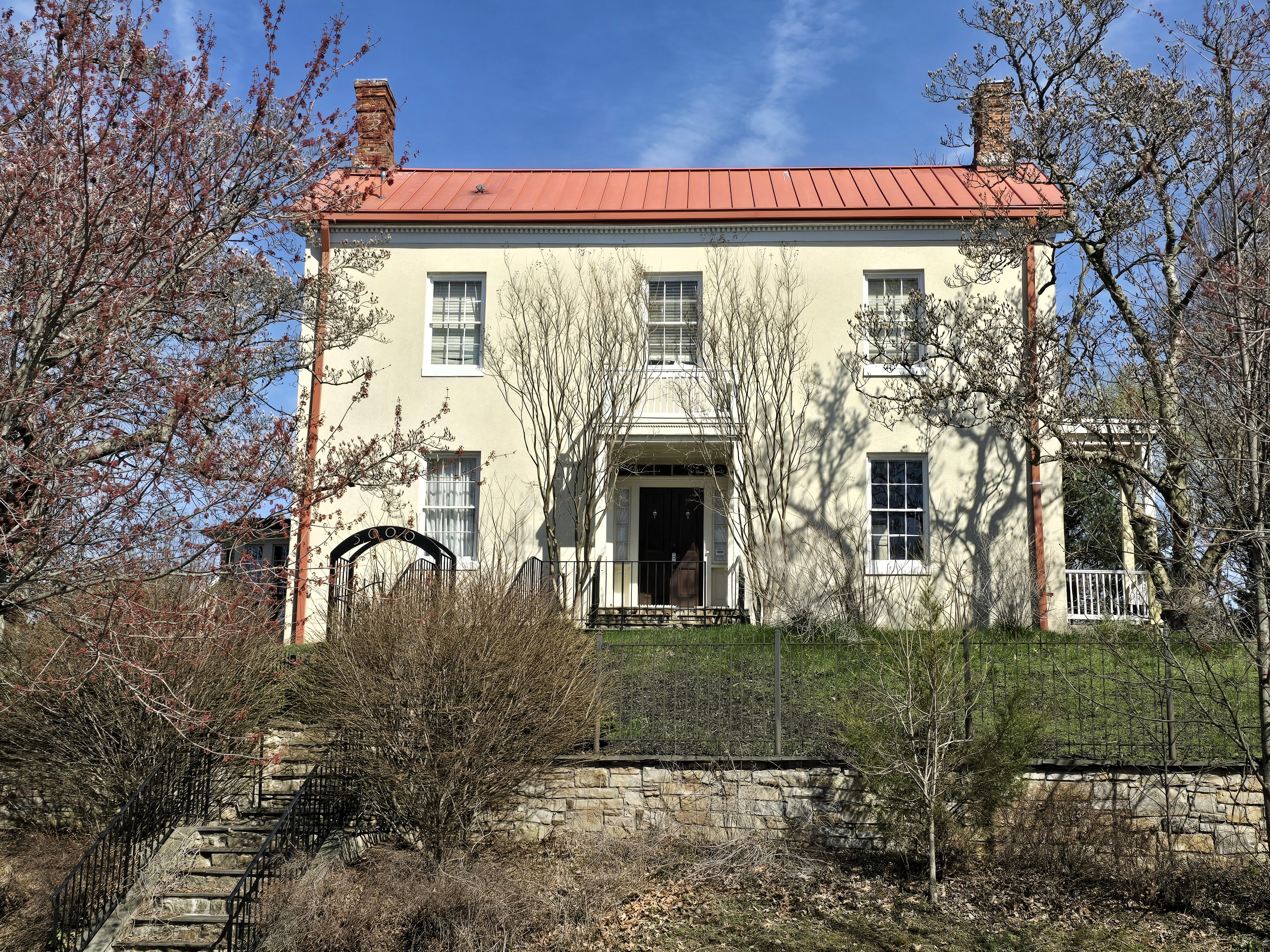
Front view

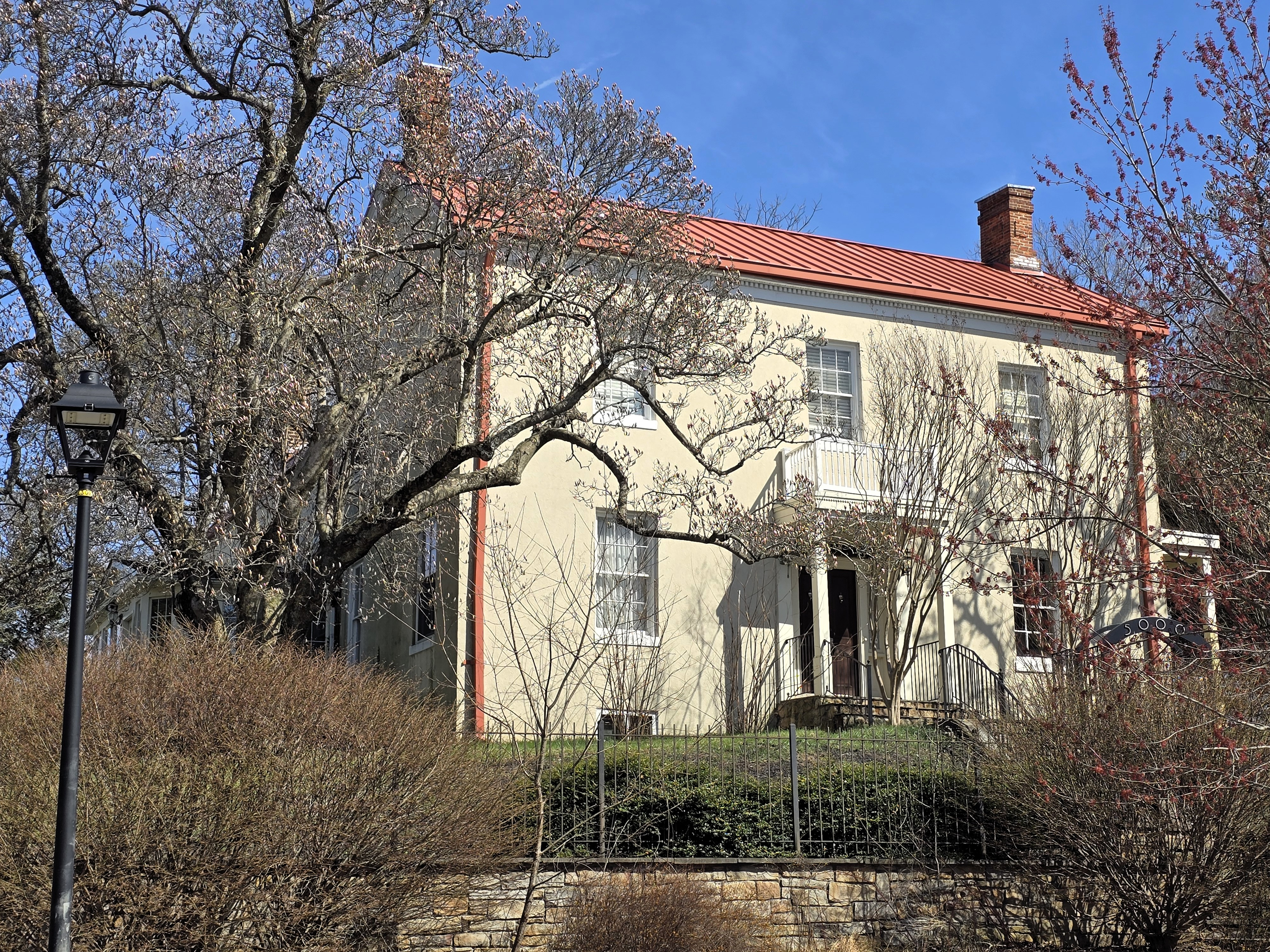
Partial side view

The main farm building is an L-shaped layout built of brick with a stone foundation, built about 1851. In 2003 the remaining 86 acres of the site was subdivided and outbuilding were demolished for a Winchester Homes Subdivision, leaving the farmhouse remaining. A barn was offered to the Howard County Conservancy to relocate off the historic setting.

== Outbuildings ==
- Dairy barn – Built before 1798, moved to a stone foundation between 1815 and 1840. Moved to Woodstock, Maryland, in 2003.
- Stone kitchen – two-story. Collapsed in the winter of 2002.
- Log smokehouse
- Frame garage
- Bank barn – A good condition building, demolished by Winchester Homes.
- Granary – A good condition building, demolished by Winchester Homes.
- Chicken coop
- Tenant houses (2) – Developer Winchester homes concluded that the wooden lath holding plaster was circular-sawn, so the entire house was newer than 1850, and was not worth preservation, although the date of the plaster installation was undocumented.

== See also ==
- List of Howard County properties in the Maryland Historical Trust
- Wheatfield (Ellicott City, Maryland)
- Bethesda (Ellicott City, Maryland)
