= Brother's Partnership =

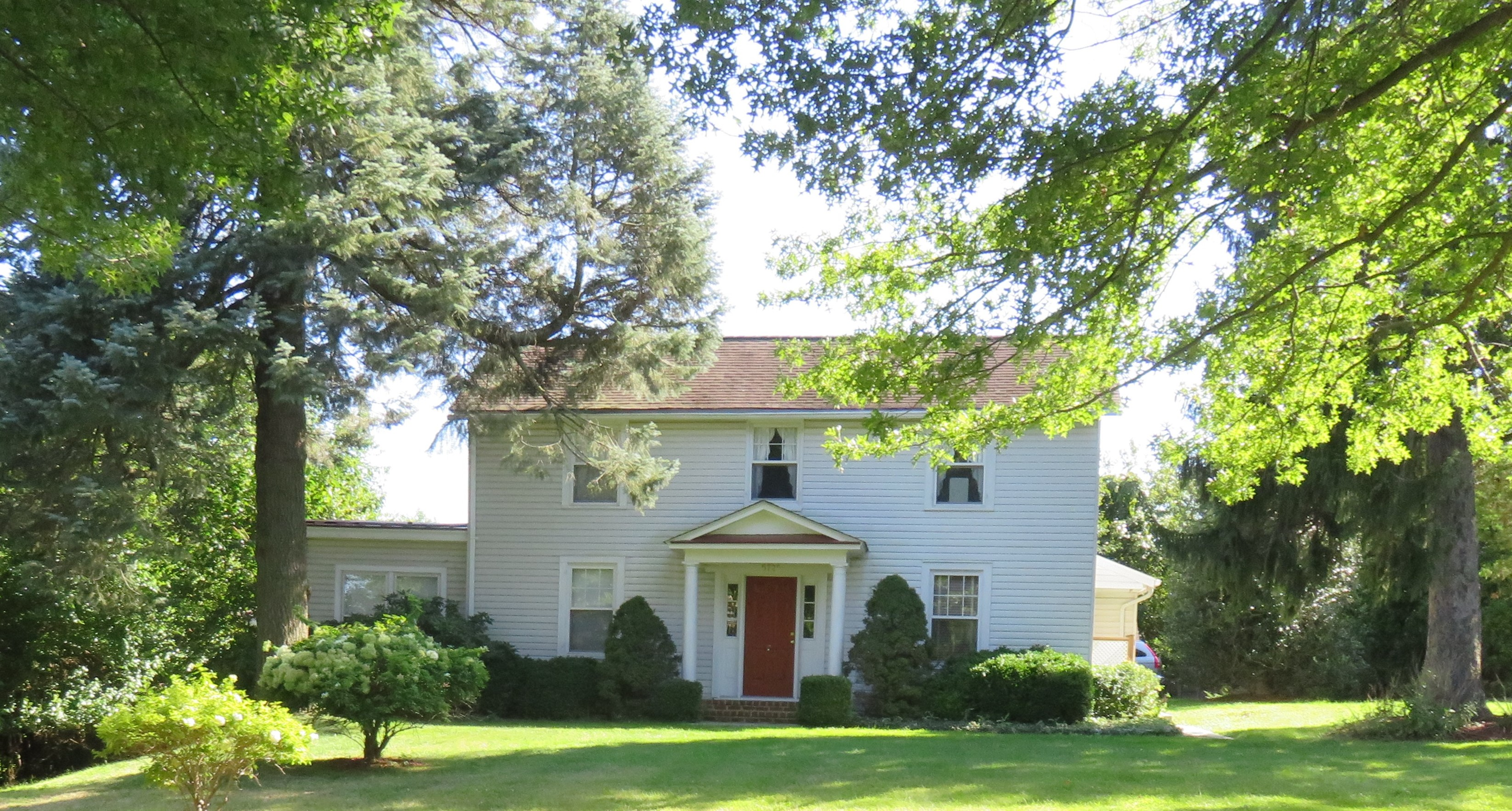
- Brother's Partnership in 2015

- Location within Maryland
- 39°12′46″N 76°48′11″W
- Location: Ellicott City, Maryland

History
- Built: Early 19th century

Site notes
- Area: Ellicott City

Brother's Partnership (also called Peter Harmon House) is a historic house in Ellicott City, Howard County, Maryland.

The house is located on a 600-acre tract patented in 1734 by Joshua Dorsey named "Brother's Partnership". The house built on the property is a wooden structure with L-shaped additions. James and Harriet Shipley sold the 66-acre property to Peter A. Harmon and the neighboring Curtis-Shipley Farmstead in 1874. In 1890 a kitchen addition was built onto the house. In 1927 a major restoration was completed. The property has been subdivided with no visible signs of the original farm. The house is surrounded by modern buildings in a residential cul-de-sac.

== See also ==
- List of Howard County properties in the Maryland Historical Trust
- Curtis-Shipley Farmstead
- Long Reach, Columbia, Maryland
- Wheatfield (Ellicott City, Maryland)
- Bethesda (Ellicott City, Maryland)
