= Curtis-Shipley Farmstead =

Historic house in Maryland, United States

- U.S. National Register of Historic Places
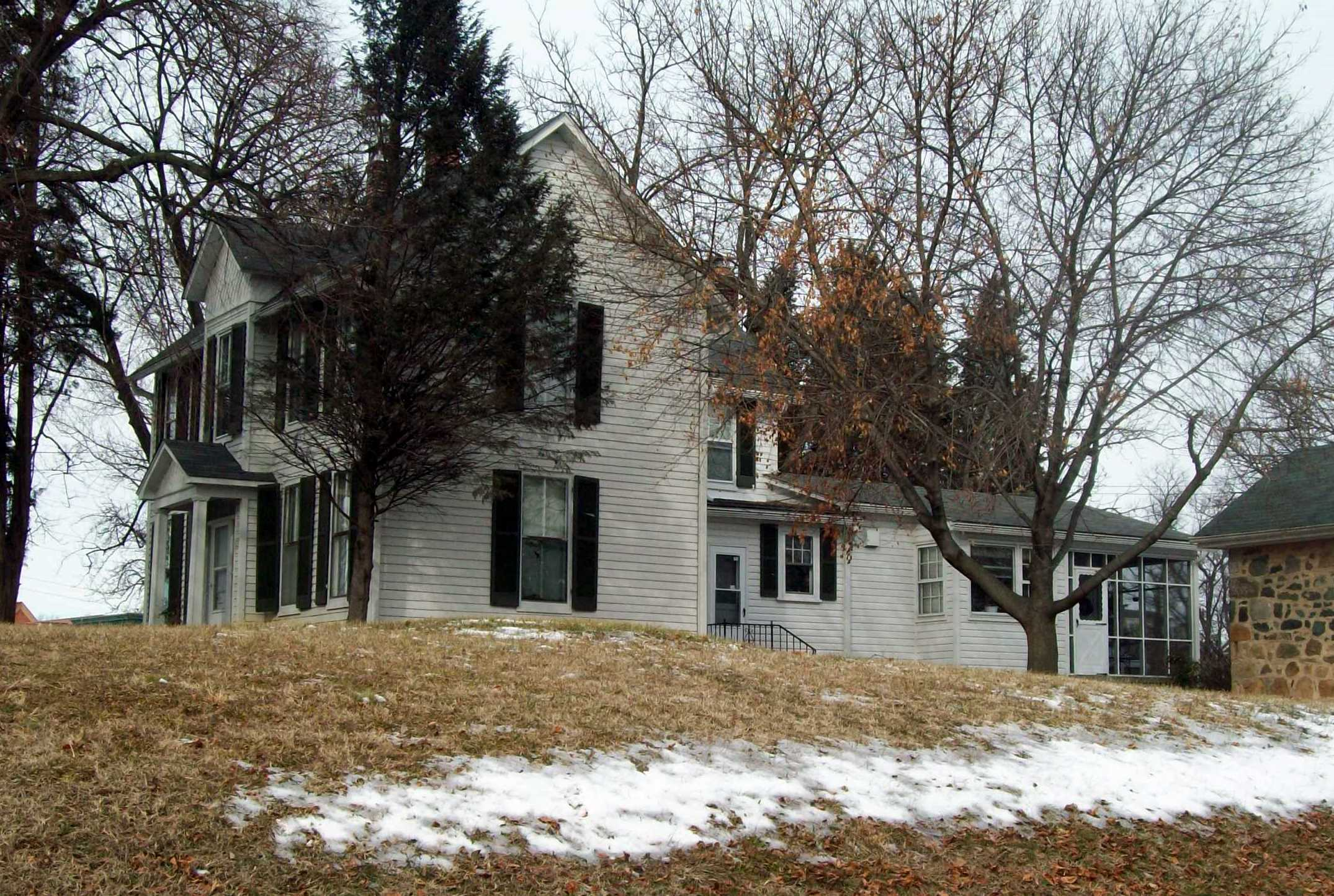
- Curtis-Shipley Farmstead, January 2011

- Location within Maryland Location within the United States
- Location: 5771 Waterloo Rd., Ellicott City, Maryland
- Coordinates: 39°12′53″N 76°48′3″W
- Area: 7.5 acres (3.0 ha)
- Built: c. 1875, 1891
- Architectural style: Gothic
- NRHP reference No.: 06001127
- Added to NRHP: December 12, 2006

The Curtis—Shipley Farmstead is a historic home located at Ellicott City, Howard County, Maryland, United States. It is located on the first land grant in modern Howard County, then Anne Arundel County, to the English settler Adam Shipley in 1688 who settled properties in Maryland as early as 1675. The 500-acre estate was called "Adam the First".

In 1874, the property was sold with buildings to Peter A. Harmon. A two-story Gothic Revival frame house built with an addition built by John and Lousia Curtis in 1891. Southeast of the main house is a gable-front frame garage, a one-story shed-roofed chicken house, a hog barn, a frame board-and-batten granary, and a board-and-batten bank barn with an unusually deep forebay. The property also contains Shipley and Brown family cemetery.

William Smallwood in acquired the property and in 1883 the property was acquired by James A. Curtis, who willed it to his son Robert Curtis who in turn willed it his sons Robert Jr. and Glenn.

In 1958 the existing porch was remodeled and converted into a full kitchen and indoor plumbing was added at that time. In 1992, the property boundaries were redefined by the Maryland State Highway Administration to accommodate the Route 100 construction through the historic farm. In 2002 56-acres was sold and subdivided to Buzzuto Homes for a development "Shipley's Grant" which surrounds the historic home now.

The Curtis-Shipley Farmstead was listed on the National Register of Historic Places in 2006.

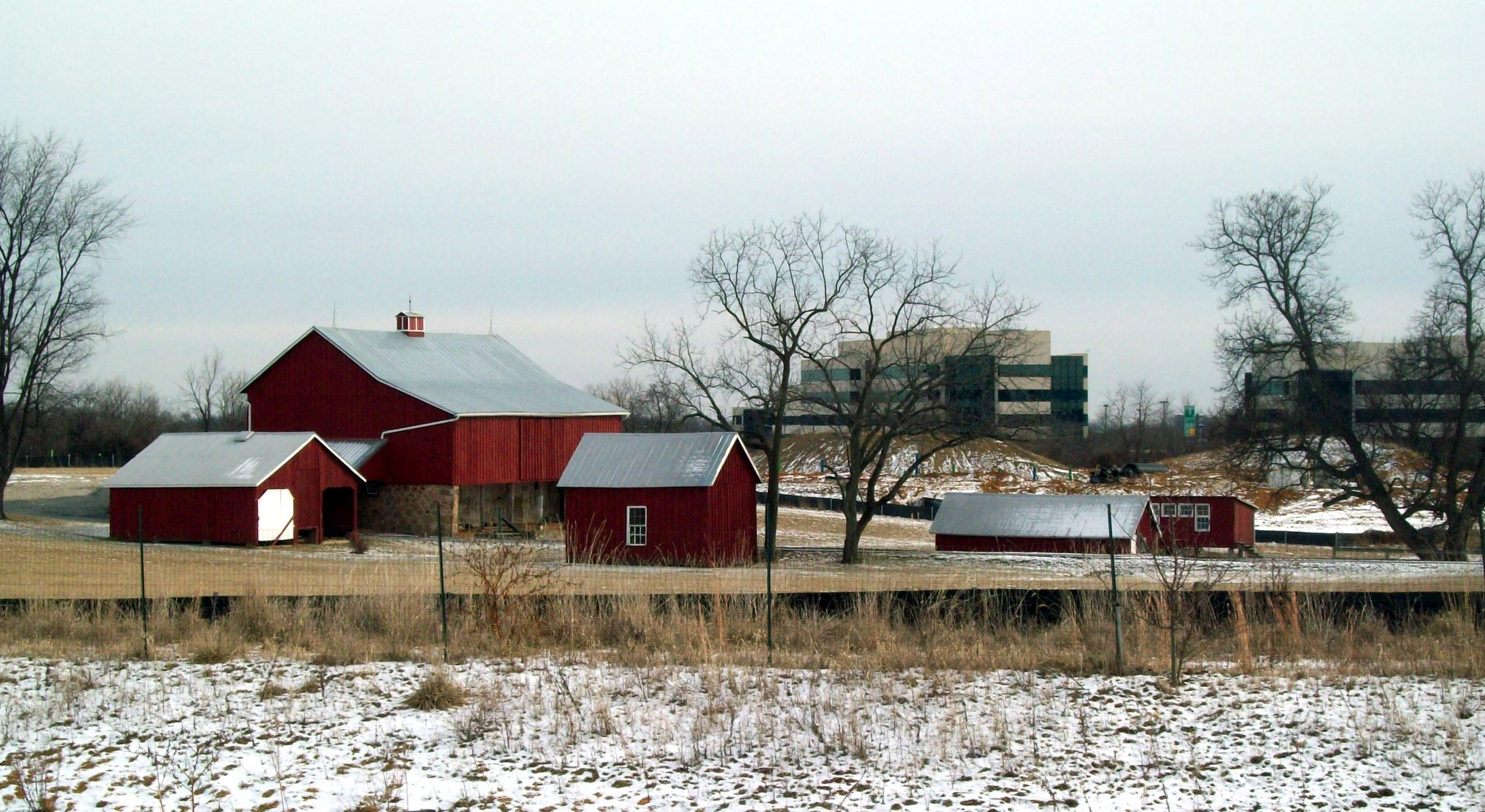
Curtis-Shipley Farmstead Outbuildings, January 2011

== See also ==
- Shipley's Adventure (Cooksville, Maryland)
- Bellow's Spring Methodist Church
- Brothers Partnership
