= Howard County Conservancy =

Land trust and nature center in Maryland, United States

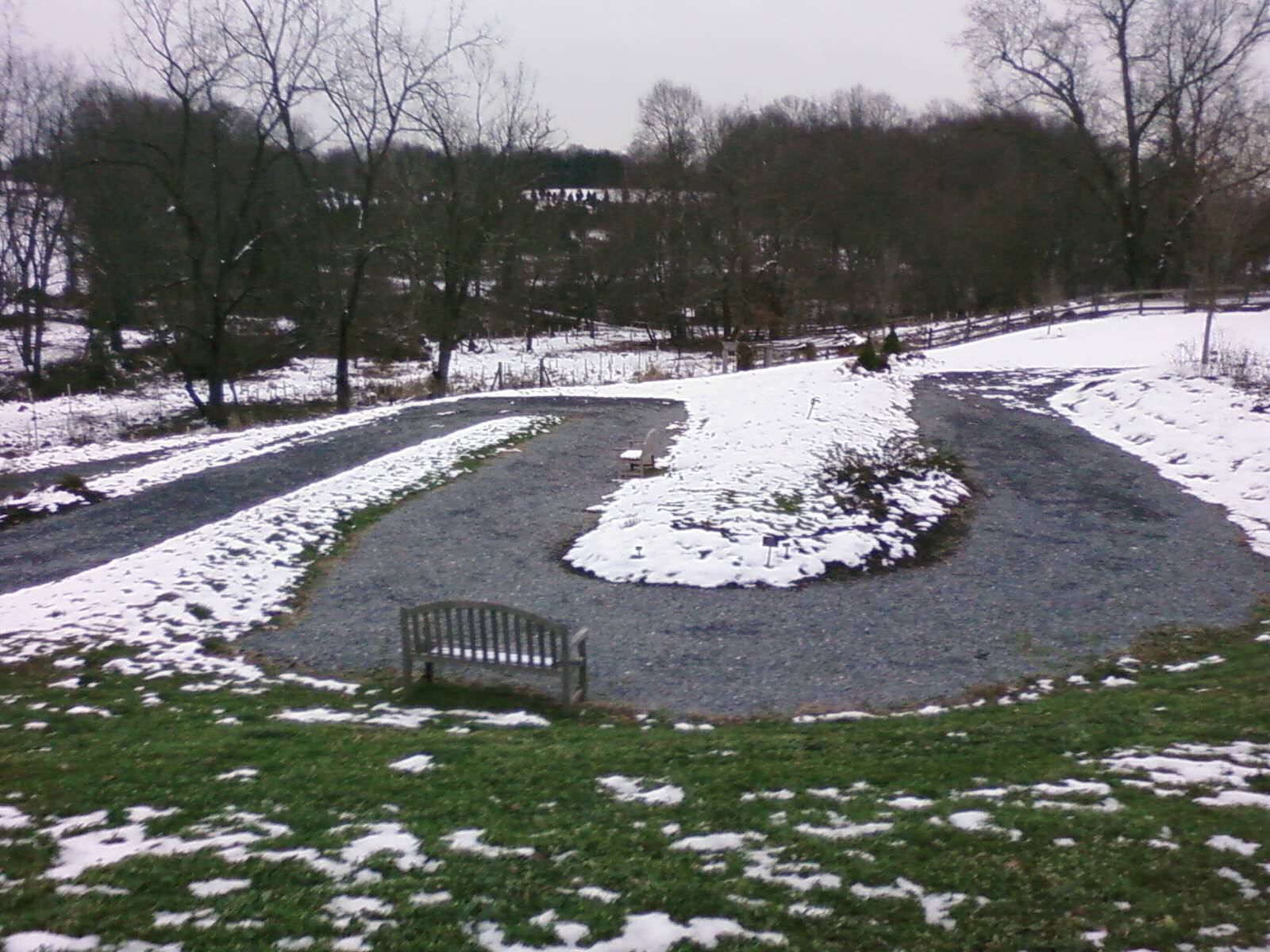
- Interactive map of Howard County Conservancy
- Type: Non-profit land trust, nature center
- Location: 10520 Old Frederick Road; Woodstock, Maryland
- Coordinates: 39°18′56″N 76°52′27″W
- Area: 232 acres (0.94 km^{2})
- Created: 1990
- Operator: Howard County, Maryland
- Website: hcconservancy.org

The Howard County Conservancy is a non-profit land trust that operates a nature center in Woodstock, Maryland. Founded in 1990, the center is located at the historic 300-year-old, 232-acre (0.94 km^{2}) Mt. Pleasant Farm, and also maintains an additional nature center at the nearby Belmont Manor.

== History ==
The center was founded in 1990 as a private land trust with the goal of protecting and preserving farmland and historic sites in Howard County. The conservancy currently also manages legal easements on an additional 1,600 acres of land. In 2014, the conservancy started a second nature center at Belmont Manor.

=== Mt. Pleasant Farm Center ===
The Mt. Pleasant farm dates back to 1692 when Patuxent Ranger Thomas Browne II built a log house on a land grant "Ranters Ridge". Owners and descendants Ruth and Francis Brown died in 1990 and 1992 respectively requesting their estate be preserved and used for educational purposes. James Eacker, George Reynolds, Joyce Kelly and Senator James A. Clark, Jr. completed tasks to acquire the farm and have the state and county pay estate expenses.

In 1997, the center hired its first full-time director.

In 2005 the Gudelsky Environmental Education Center opened.

In 2008, the center started an exhibit on solar energy, promoting it as a way of reducing energy costs.

In 2010, the center obtained an owl as part of a program to teach children about environmental threats to the owl species.

A historic barn from Mt. Joy in Ellicott City has been relocated to the site.

== See also ==
- List of Howard County properties in the Maryland Historical Trust
- Belmont Estate
- James and Anne Robinson Nature Center

== Gallery ==
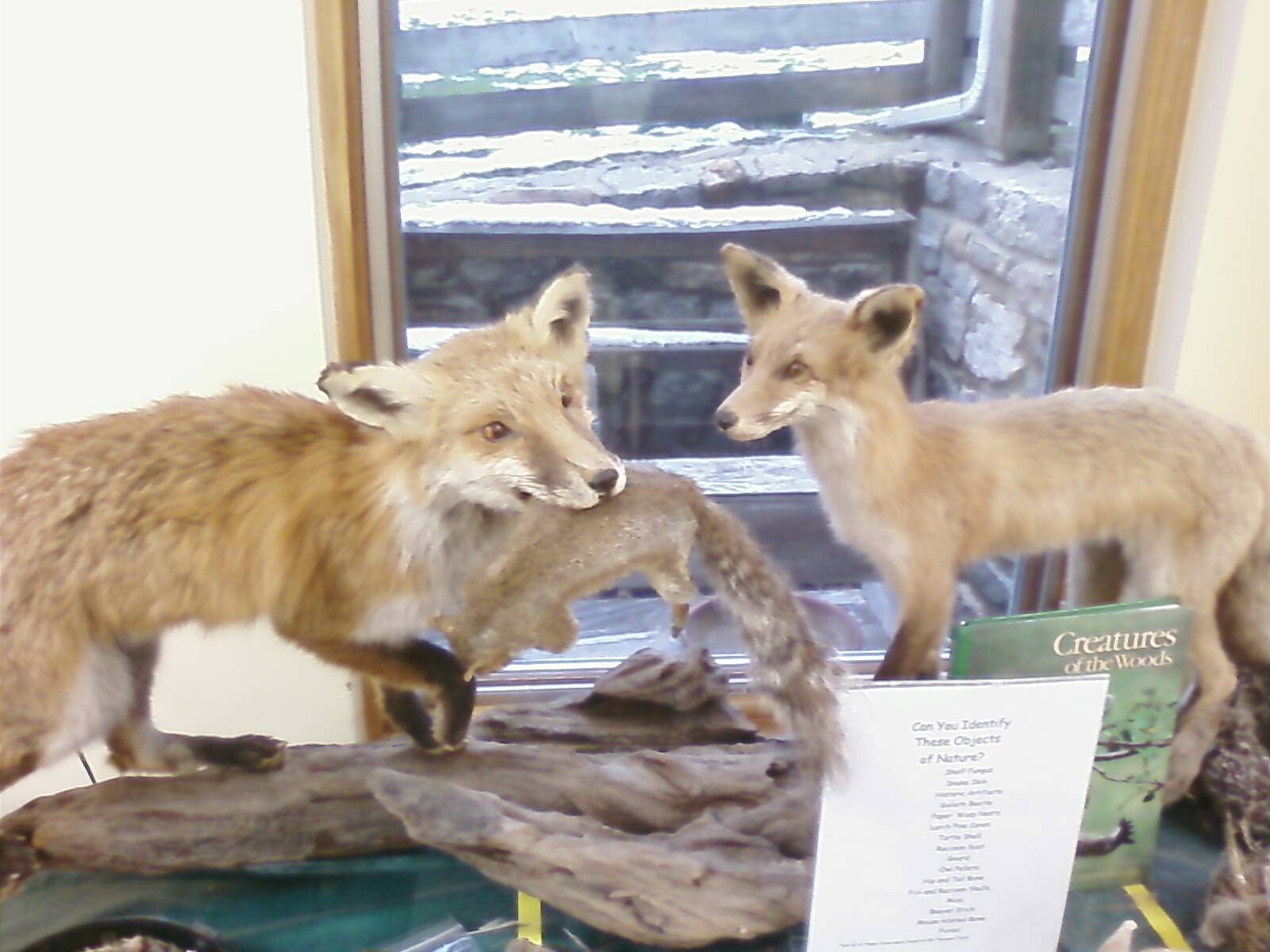
Stuffed foxes on display

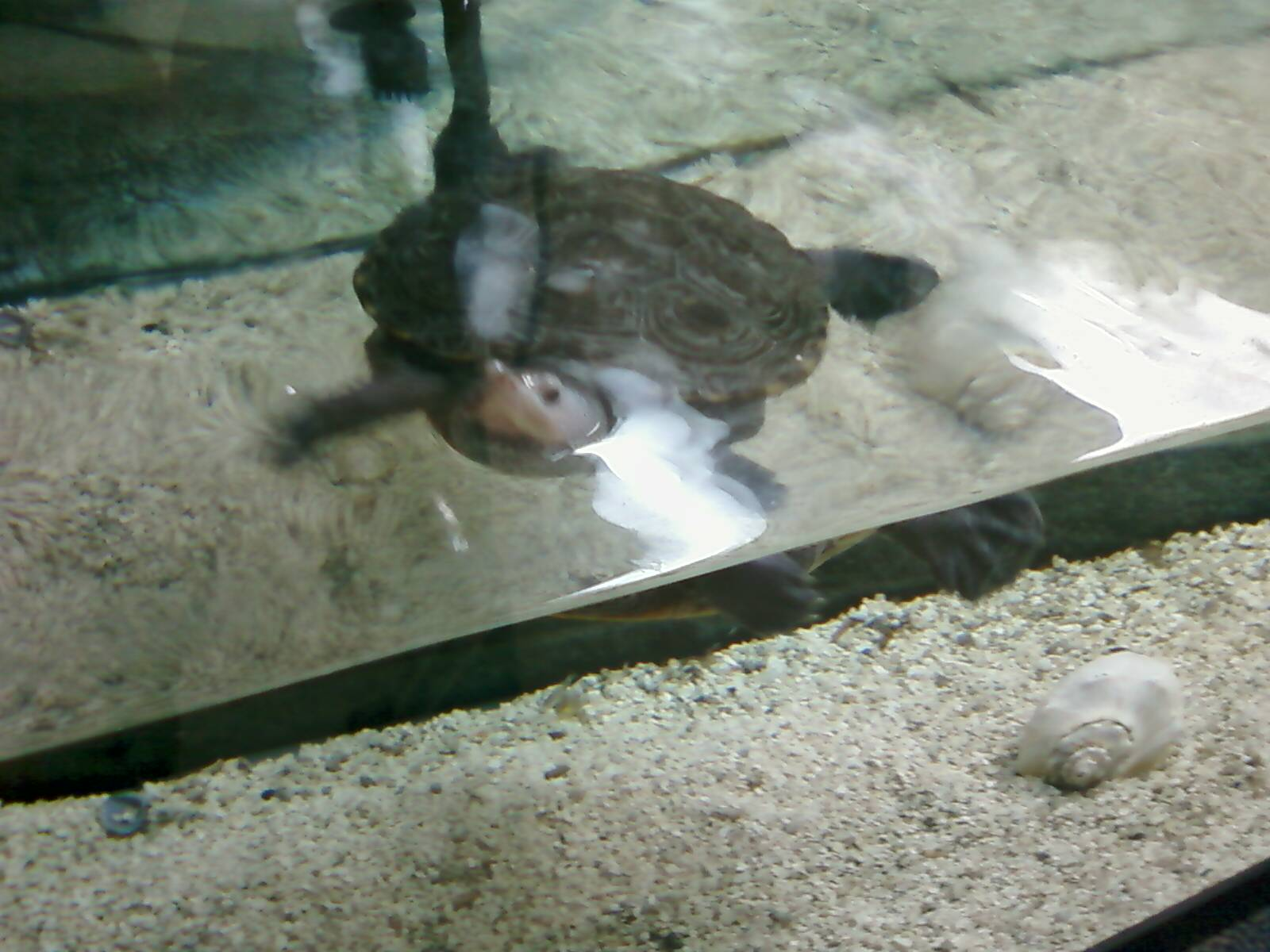
Turtle

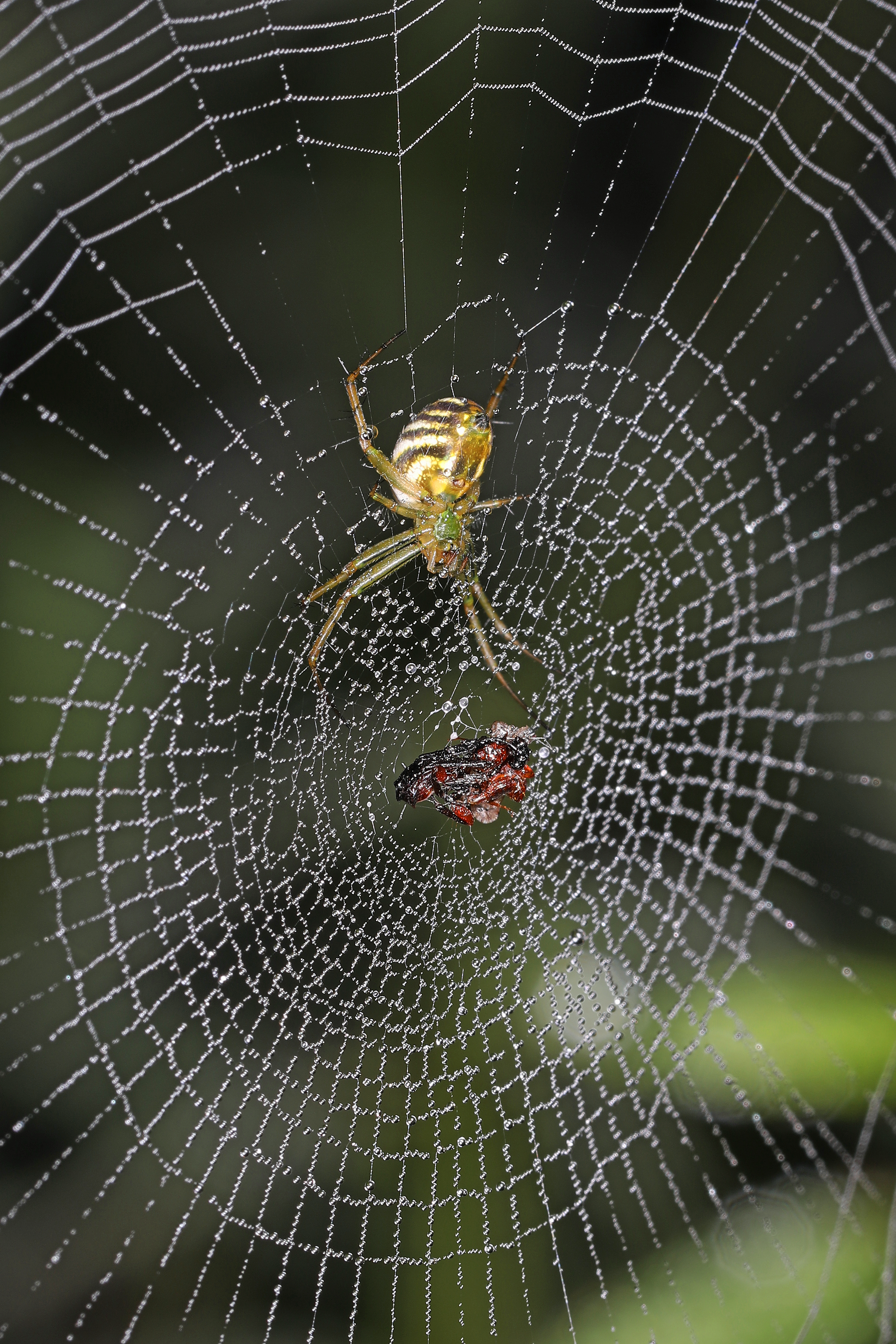
Mangora gibberosa
