= Mt. Pleasant (Woodstock, Maryland) =

Historic home and farm

Mt Pleasant
- Location within Maryland
- 39°31′51″N 76°52′30″W
- Location: Woodstock, Maryland

History
- Built: abt 1695

Site notes
- Architectural styles: Log, Frame

Mt Pleasant is a historic home and farm located in Woodstock, Howard County, Maryland. The land grant of the property was surveyed by Patuxent Ranger Thomas Browne as "Ranter's Ridge" in 1692. The farm house is built around an original log cabin. In 1838 Samuel Brown (1810-1880) aggregates properties into a 232-acre farm. This included 192 acres of the Hammonds Ridge tract from Thomas Herbert and in 1859 an additional 40 acres from his brother John from the Good Fellowship tract. During this time a second story to the log cabin and an addition on the north side was constructed. In addition to farming Samuel Brown was elected to three consecutive terms as commissioner of the Howard District of Anne Arundel County starting in 1846.

During the Civil War the farm was the hiding place of 1st Maryland Infantry, CSA General Bradley Tyler Johnson, and munitions storage for the nearby Doughoregan Manor.

In 1993, the farm became the home of the Howard County Conservancy, a private land trust.

== See also ==
- List of Howard County properties in the Maryland Historical Trust
