= Jonestown, Howard County, Maryland =

Unincorporated community in Maryland, U.S.

Coordinates: 39°13′19″N 76°48′27″W

Jonestown is an unincorporated community in Howard County, Maryland, United States.

The Jonestown area was a historic African American community near Ellicott City that was centered on the crossroads where Howard High School is presently located. The town's identity has been mostly absorbed into Ellicott City and Columbia's Long Reach village.

== History ==
Jonestown appeared on Martenet's 1860 map of Howard County, George Kaiser's 1863 map of Baltimore County, and Martenet's 1865 map of Maryland.

== See also ==
- Bellow's Spring Methodist Church
- Long Reach, Columbia, Maryland
