= Bellow's Spring Methodist Church =

- Mt. Pisgah AME Church
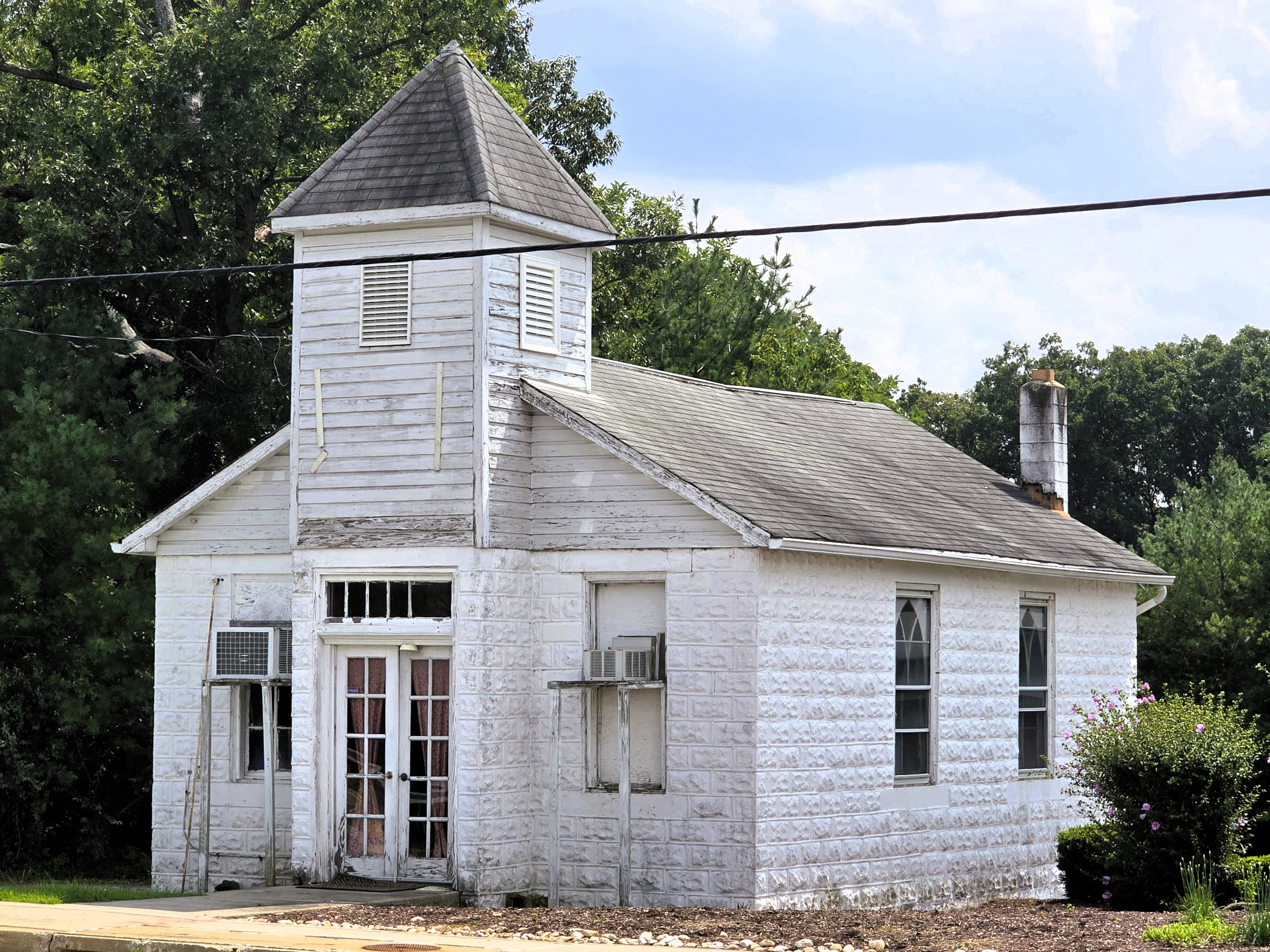
- Bellow's Spring Methodist Church (Mt. Pisgah AME Church) in 2026

- Location within Maryland
- 39°13′24″N 76°48′37″W
- Location: Ellicott City, Maryland
- Region: Howard County, Maryland

History
- Built: Early 19th century

Site notes
- Architectural style: Gothic Revival
- Owner: Gyung Hyang Garden Presbyterian Church

Bellow's Spring Methodist Church (also called Mt. Pisgah AME Church) is a historic church in Ellicott City, Howard County, Maryland.

The church was built between Rufus Thompson's farm and Thomas Christian's farm (also known as Bellow's Spring Farm) in the African American community of Jonestown. In 1899 the building was relocated to its present location along Route 108, taking the name Mt. Pisgah AME Church in 1901.

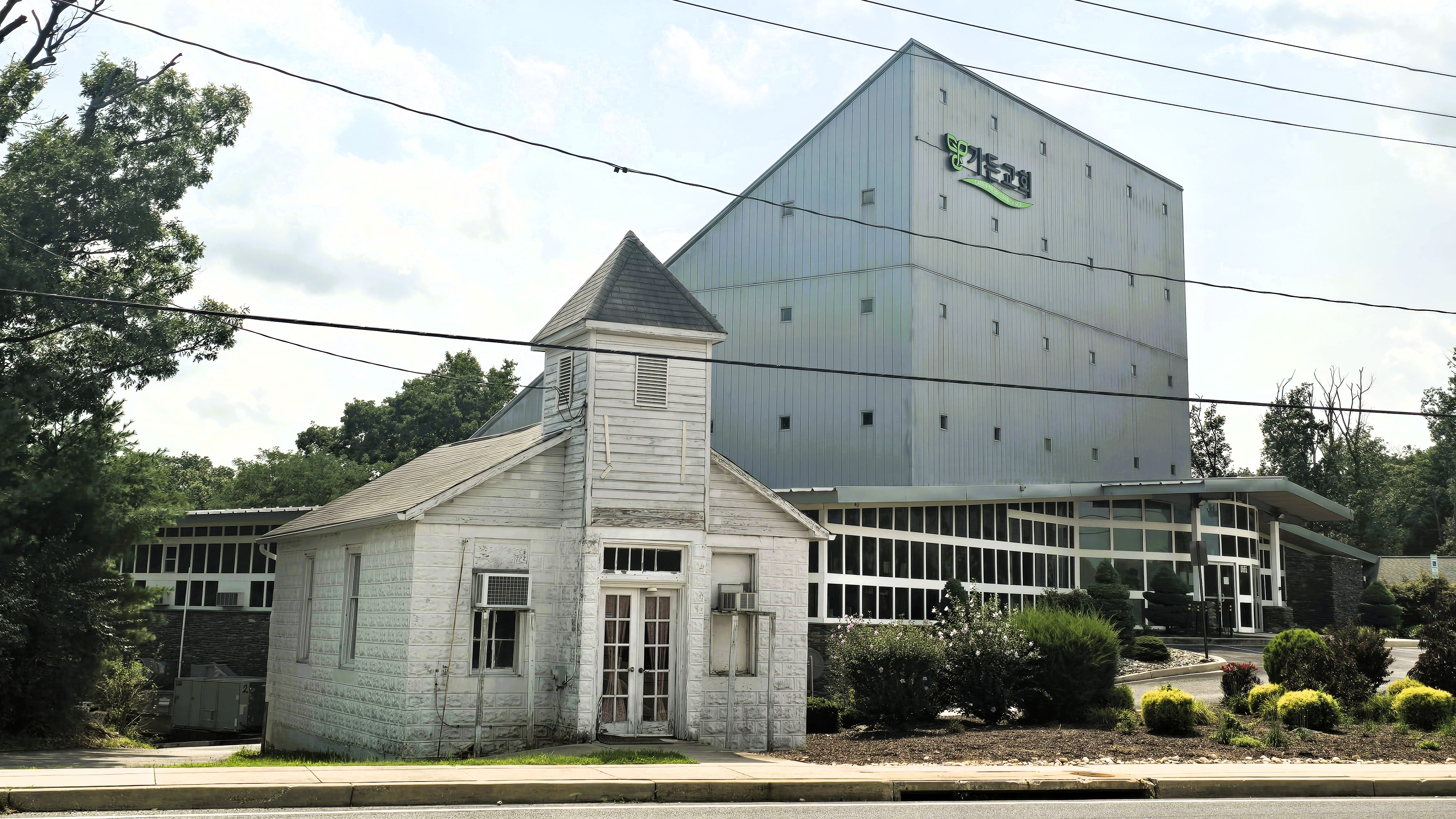
Bellow's Spring Methodist Church (foreground), Gyung Hyang Garden Presbyterian Church (background)

The 19th century church is dwarfed by the modern Gyung Hyang Garden Presbyterian Church constructed adjacent to the building.

== See also ==
- List of Howard County properties in the Maryland Historical Trust
- Long Reach, Columbia, Maryland
- Wheatfield (Ellicott City, Maryland)
- Bethesda (Ellicott City, Maryland)
- AME Church
