= Long Reach, Columbia, Maryland =

Coordinates: 39°12′29″N 76°48′46″W

Long Reach
- Village
- Long Reach Village
- Interactive map of Long Reach
- Country: United States
- State: Maryland
- City: Columbia
- Established: 1971
- Named after: Land grant of Edward Dorsey in 1696

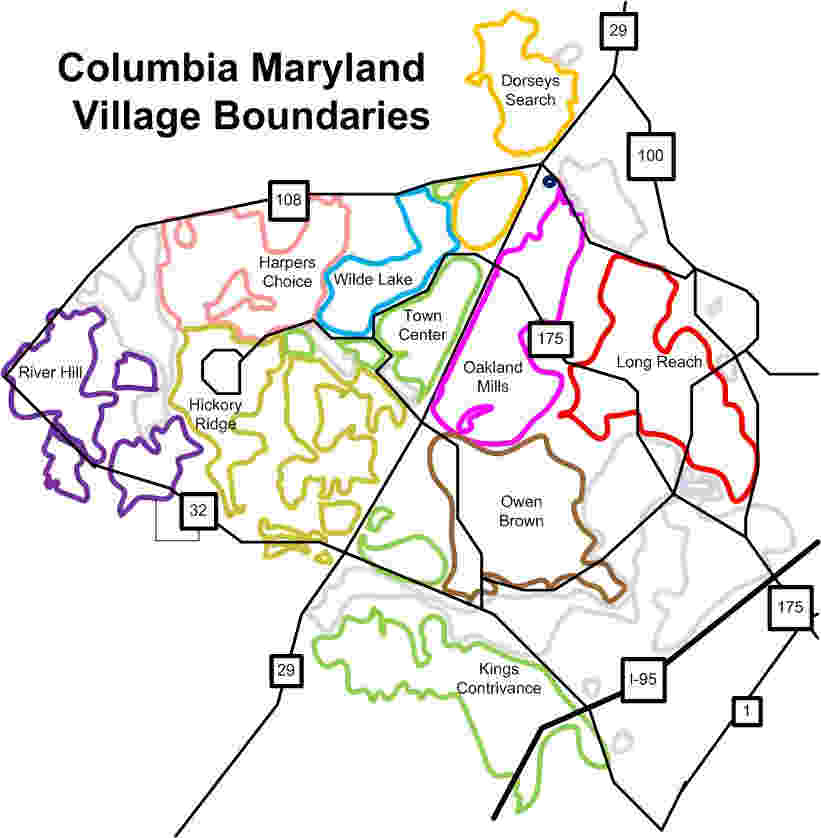
Villages of Columbia

Long Reach, one of ten villages composing Columbia, Maryland, United States, is found in the northeast part of Columbia along Maryland Route 108. Started in 1971, it is one of the oldest villages, and comprises four neighborhoods: Jeffers Hill, Kendall Ridge, Locust Park, and Phelps Luck. The village, with an approximate population of 15,600, is governed by five elected village board members through "Long Reach Community Association, Inc." The Village Office is located in Stonehouse, the community center, which opened in 1974.

== History ==
The village derives its name from a 448-acre (181 ha) land grant named Long Reach, patented to and surveyed by Major Edward Dorsey in 1696 next to Dorseys Search. Dorsey had built a small stone summer home named "Bethesda" on the site in 1682 passing it to Caleb Dorsey of Belmont. The property was divided between his three sons "John of Col Edward", Benjamin and "Nicholas of Long Reach" Dorsey in 1705. John's son Samuel inherited Dorsey's search in 1761. In 1782 John Lawrance Dorsey inherited the land. It was resurveyed as "Chew's Resolution".

In 1769, the "Bethesda Old Place Farm" home was expanded on the property and run as a tobacco-producing plantation with 26 slave workers. Mary Dorsey Pue inherited Belmont in 1771, and her husband Doctor Micheal Pue was appointed to run the county in 1775 (Anne Arundel). The estate was expanded again in 1830, struck by a tornado in 1858, and stayed in the Pue family until 1859. By 1943, the property had been subdivided to 237 remaining acres. In 1954, the Columbia Hills Corporation developed the land leaving just 7.3 acres surrounding the house. Howard Research and Development purchased most of the original Long Reach property between 1963 and 1966 for the development of Columbia.

In addition to the Long Reach grant, the 100-acre Brunner family farm, and a 200-acre apple orchard owned by Donald and Ethel Sewell since 1943, occupied the eastern section of Long Reach village. 28 acres were sold to Howard Research and Development in 1963. The apple orchard remained in operation until 1983 when it was sold for development because of liability from trespassers and drug use, leaving only street names named after varieties of apples.

The crossroads of modern Waterloo Road and Old Montgomery Road formed the Pfeffer's Corner area which hosted a blacksmith, general store and schoolhouse predating the Civil War. German prisoners of war would be delivered to site daily from Fort Meade through WWII to be used as farmhands by local residents.

== Names ==
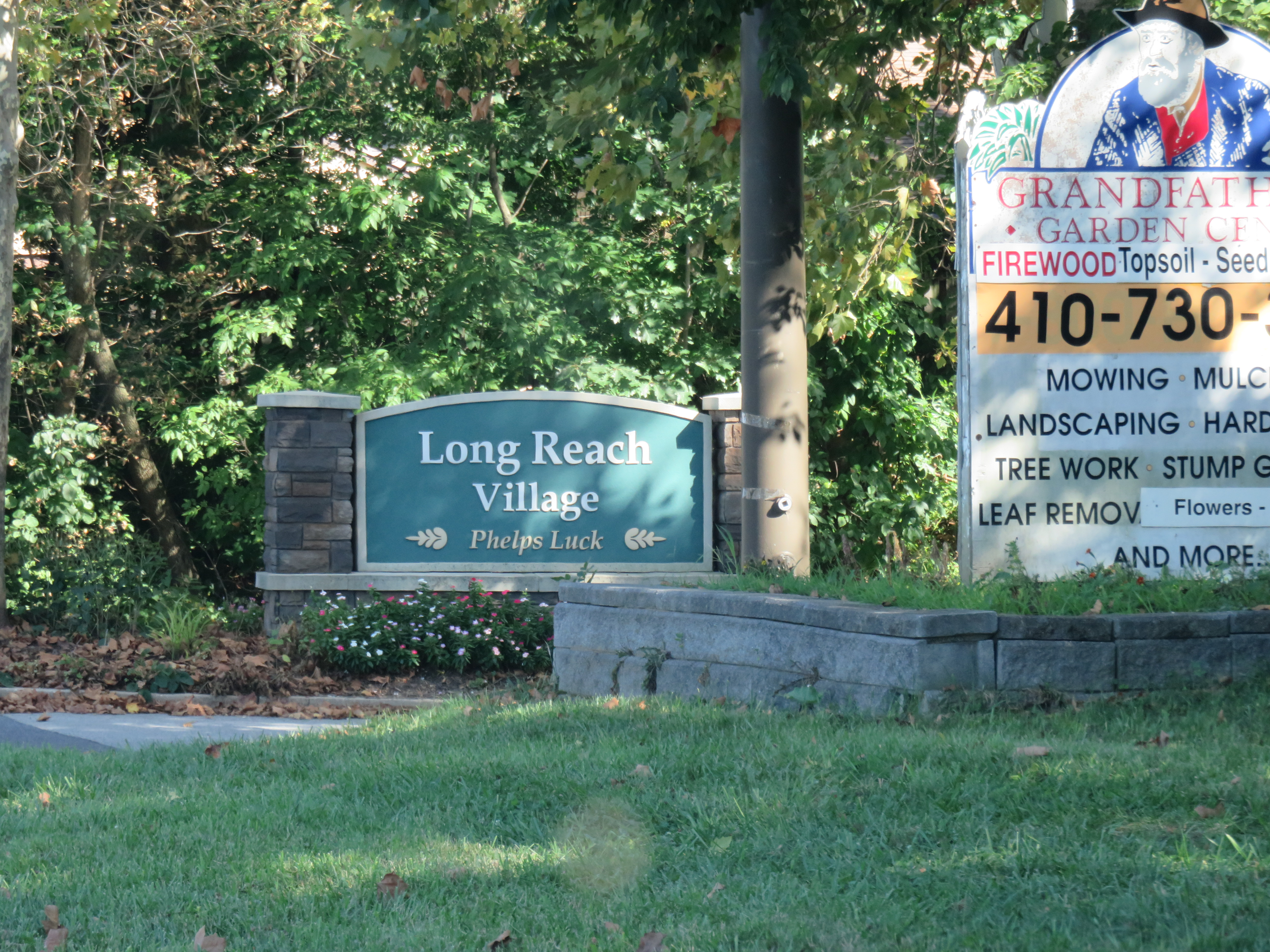
Long Reach Village – Phelps Luck

Many of the village's streets take their names from the works of the American poet Robinson Jeffers, after whom the Jeffers Hill neighborhood is named.

- Phelps Luck is named for the land grant, Phelps His Luck, patented to Walter Phelps in 1695.
- Locust Park is named for the land grant Locust Thickett, patented to Richard Owings in 1688. The 384-acre parcel was passed on by Joshua Dorsey (1686–1747) in 1747.
- Kendall Ridge is from the 500-acre land grant, Kendall's Delight, and the 400-acre Kendall's Enlargement patented to Daniel Kendall in 1701.
- Jackson Pond – Originally named Hittman pond, after a water study on stormwater reuse performed by Hittman Associates, it was renamed after citizen activist Howard Jackson.

== Services ==
The 84,000-square-foot (7,800 m^{2}) Long Reach Village Center was designed in 1971 by Kent Cooper and Associates and opened in 1974. It featured 19 stores, including a grocery store, Pappy's restaurant, a gas station, and The Columbia Art Center which provides classes in ceramics, drawing and painting, and other art forms, and gives exhibitions.

The inward-facing village center concept was centrally managed by the Rouse Company, limiting ownership diversification. By the 1980s, high rents and larger teenager and crime incidents led to a decline in business. With 17 percent of Long Reach developed as subsidized housing, a secondary goal of the developer was to place the village center close to residents who may not be able to afford transportation and want to walk to the center, with an unintended effect of becoming community open space for residents not shopping. In later years, a storefront police station was operated from the center.

== Renovation of village center ==
On January 7, 2014, Howard County announced to the Long Reach Village board that it would purchase the majority of the holdings from America's Realty affiliate Long Reach Village Associates LLC, pending sales negotiations and related legislation. Celebration Church planned to occupy the former Safeway and Family Market space at the center. The project is managed by the county director of downtown redevelopment, who said the county has suggested relocating its arts council from Ellicott City to the village center. On March 3, 2014, the county declared the area a blighted zone. Howard County purchased portions of the property for $5 million, offering to sell the Safeway space to Celebration Church for $2.5 million. The deal fell through as different legislation packages proposed giving or charging the church an additional $1 million for parking rights. On May 28, 2015, the County held its first "ReImagine Long Reach" meeting. The purpose of the meeting was to consider options for the Village Center's renovation, and evaluate case studies where other village centers had been renovated (such as the Wilde Lake Village Center), as well as consider possibilities for the arts.

== Education ==
- Howard High School
- Long Reach High School
- Oakland Mills High School
- Bonnie Branch Middle School
- Oakland Mills Middle School
- Mayfield Woods Middle School
- Phelps Luck Elementary School
- Jeffers Hill Elementary School

== See also ==
- Bellow's Spring Methodist Church
- Chews Resolution Manor
