= Thomas Browne II =

- Born: before 1648
- Died: 1715
- Spouse: Catherine Summerland
- Children: Joshua Browne Sr. (1698–1774), Hannah Browne, John Browne, Valentine Browne Sr. (1692–1770)
- Parent(s): Thomas Browne, William Hopkins (stepfather)
- Relatives: John Browne (uncle)

Thomas Browne II (before 1648–1715) was an early settler of Maryland.

== Early life ==
Thomas Browne II was an early settler of Anne Arundel County, Maryland, in regions now part of Howard County, Maryland. He was frequently referred to as "Thomas Browne, the Patuxent Ranger" for settling lands West of the Chesapeake Bay along the Patuxent River.

Browne's uncle, John Browne, who was involved in the Battle of the Severn, left his estate property to Thomas Browne II in a 1668 will. The first such property granted to him was "Browne's Peace" of Anne Arundel in 1676.

Thomas was commissioned to explore from the Snowden plantation westward upstream to the limits of the Patuxent River. His plantations formed the southern boundaries of Charles Carroll the Settler's Doughoregan Manor.

Some of the early land grants Browne patented include Friendship, Increase, Browne's Folly, Browne's Chance, Addition, Browne's Adventure, Diamond, Browne's Forest, Browne's Increase, Ranter's Ridge, and Clink.
