= Bethesda (Ellicott City, Maryland) =

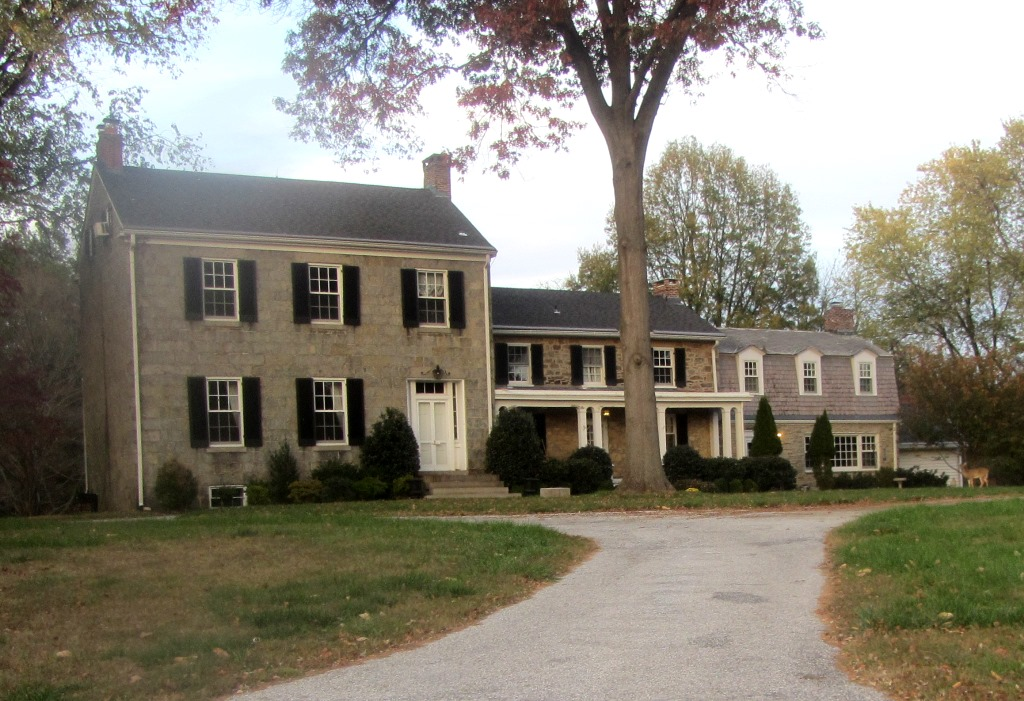
- Bethesda

- Location within Maryland
- 39.24489608643542°N 76.82943860737979°W
- Nearest city: Ellicott City, Maryland

History
- Built: circa 1682

Site notes
- Architectural style: Georgian

Bethesda is located in Ellicott City, Maryland within Howard County, Maryland, United States. The home is sometimes mistakenly referred to as "Dower House" because a small dower house exists on the property. A "dower" is a widow's share for life of her husband's estate, so a dower house is where a widowed mother would live when her son and his family inherited and moved into the main house.

The foundation of the original house was found using ground penetrating radar to the west of the existing structure. The center portion of the existing house is the oldest; dendrochronology revealed that the trees for the wood in that portion of the house were felled the winter of 1827–1828. Dendrochronology also revealed that the large granite section of the house to the west was added in 1841. The east section was added in 1960 by owner John M. DeBoy. While the house looks wide from the street, it is only one room deep. Outbuildings include a smoke house, a carriage house, and the stone "Dower House" which may have been built in the early 1830s to serve as a summer kitchen.

Bethesda rests on a collection of surveyed properties totaling 1000 acres named "Long Reach", "Chews Resolution Manor", "Search Enlarged", "Search", and "Dorsey's Search" (448 Acres). The land grant was given to Maj Edward Dorsey (1646–1705) in 1682. When Edward Dorsey died, he willed the land to his nephew, Caleb Dorsey of "Belmont" in Elkridge, Maryland. Caleb gave the land to his daughter, Mary, when she married Michael Pue, an Irish doctor. They are the first people known to live on the property, and they lived there in 1790 when the newly formed United States of America conducted its first tax assessment. In 1769, the "Bethesda Old Place Farm" home was expanded on the property and run as a tobacco-producing plantation with 26 slave workers. Two successive generations of Pues also lived there. The property was struck by a tornado in 1858, and stayed in the Pue family until 1859. It was purchased by Thomas Lishear, a sea captain. He had three daughters who never married, and they lived in the house until their deaths. The house was later owned by Dr. George B. Sybert. By 1943, the property had been subdivided to 237 remaining acres. In 1954, the Columbia Hills Corporation developed the land leaving just 8.3 acres surrounding the house. By 1965, the land was subdivided down to three acres. Howard Research and Development purchased most of the original Long Reach property between 1963 and 1966 for the development of Columbia.

== See also ==
- List of Howard County properties in the Maryland Historical Trust
- Long Reach, Columbia, Maryland
