= Wheatfield (Ellicott City, Maryland) =

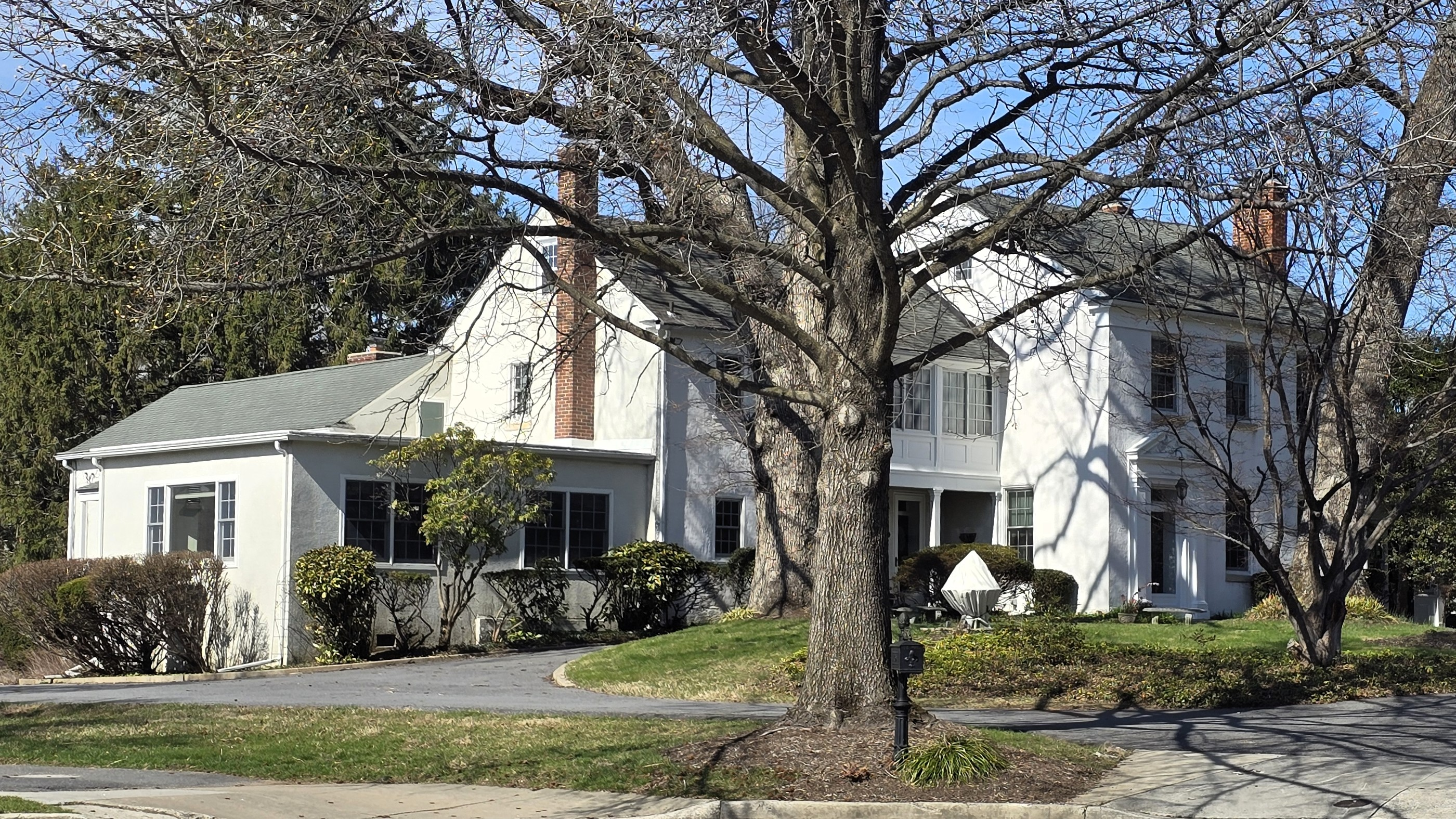
- March 2026

- Location within Maryland
- Interactive map of Wheatfield
- 39°14′37″N 76°48′17.3″W
- Location: 4634 Chatsworth Way, Ellicott City, Maryland

History
- Built: 1802

Site notes
- Architectural style: Stone

Wheatfield, also known by Wheatfields, Resolution Manor, or Wheatfield Farm is a historic home located south of Ellicott City, Howard County, Maryland.

Wheatfield started on land patented to Samuel Chew in 1695 as Chews Resolution Manor and Chews Vineyard. Caleb Dorsey inherited the land in 1718. In 1850 the 202-acre farm was purchased for $9,000 by James Clark. One son, James Clark Jr. left the farm to join the Confederate Army of Northern Virginia, surviving prison camp to return as a cattle broker. His other son John Lawrence Clark (1855-) was born at Wheatfield. He maintained the farm raising a family that would be closely associated with Howard County business and politics. The Wheatfield manor house is built in progressively smaller sections in the "Telescope style" starting in 1802. A water table runs along the foundation of the property. The farm was sold to the Widdup family in 1950 for $50,000. In 1977 the property was owned by the Doll family, who had subdivided the land to 11 acres. The manor house still stands, as of a Howard County Historical Society tour in December 2016, amidst a residential housing development of the same name.

== See also ==
- List of Howard County properties in the Maryland Historical Trust
- Clark's Elioak Farm
- Fairfield Farm
- MacAlpine
