= Chews Resolution Manor =

Historic site in Ellicott City, Maryland, US

Chews Resolution Manor - Avoca
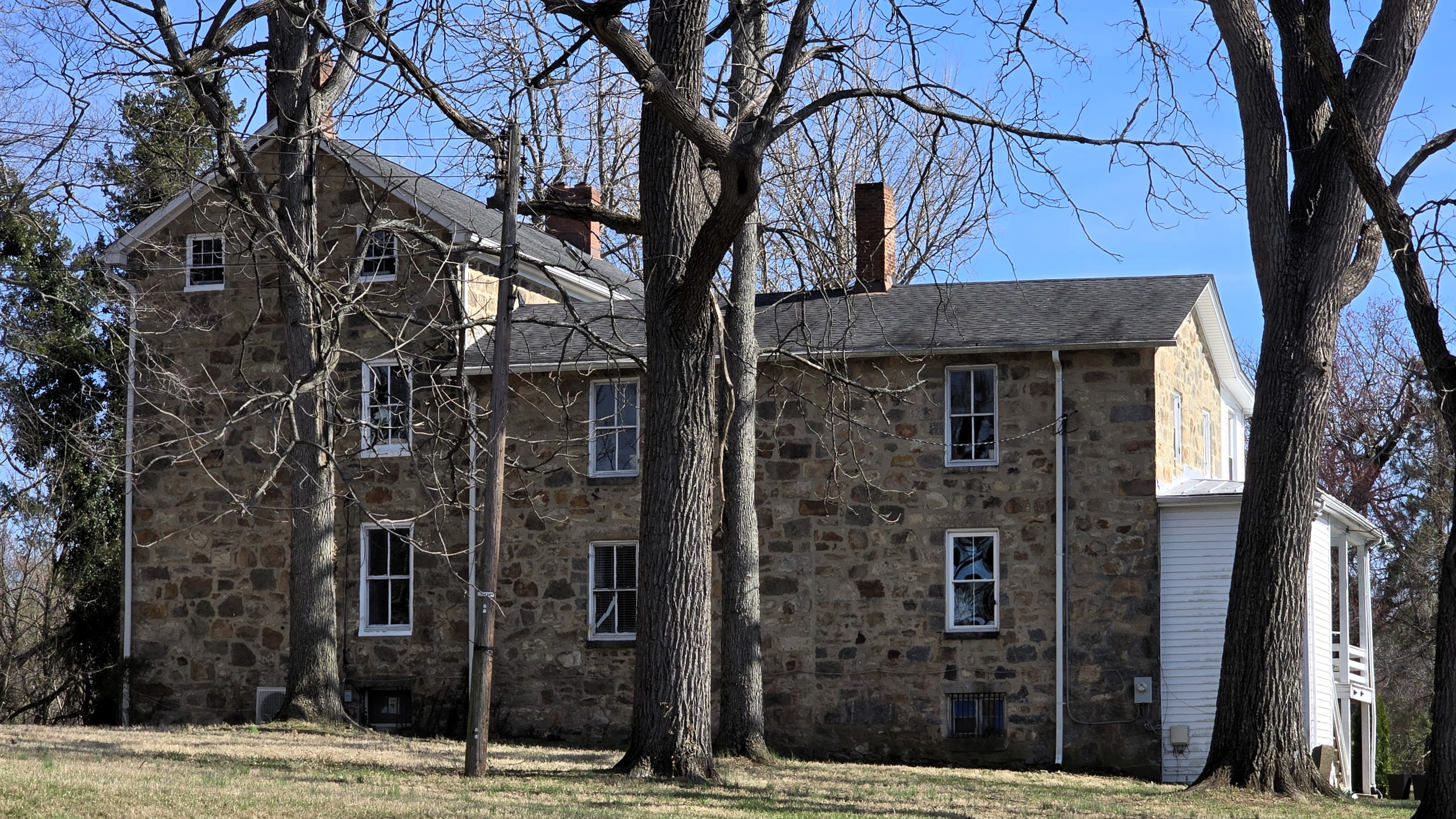
- View of the north side and rear in March 2026

- Location within Maryland
- Interactive map of Chews Resolution Manor - Avoca
- 39°14′18″N 76°48′09″W
- Location: Avoca Ave., Ellicott City, Maryland

History
- Built: Before 1718

Site notes
- Architectural style: Stone

Chews Resolution Manor, also known as Avoca, Resolution Manor, is a historic home and slave plantation located south of Ellicott City, Howard County, Maryland.

Avoca was patented by Samuel Chew in 1695 as "Chews Resolution Manor" and "Chews Vineyard". In 1877, the property was listed as part of the prominent Dr. Michael Pue's estate of 176-acres sold to Alfred W. Thoms. The land at the time was described as being "on the road from the Columbia Turnpike to Elkridge Landing and to Waterloo at the terminus of the 'New Cut Road' ... The neighborhood is noted for the salubrity of its climate, the beauty of its scenery, and the culture and elegance of its residents. Mrs. Comfort W. Dorsey, Messrs. James Clark, John C. White, Henry Winter, I. Monroe Mercer and Captain Jonett U.S. Navy, are among the nearest neighbors. ... The Dwelling is of Granite ... The Barn is immense."

As of 2025, it remains privately owned.

== See also ==
- List of Howard County properties in the Maryland Historical Trust
- Clark's Elioak Farm
- Fairfield Farm
- MacAlpine
