= Rose Zetzer =

American lawyer

- Zetzer in 1950
- Born: January 13, 1904; Baltimore, Maryland
- Died: April 5, 1998 (aged 94); Baltimore, Maryland
- Occupation: Attorney

Rose S. Zetzer (January 13, 1904 – April 5, 1998) was an American lawyer. She was the founder of Maryland's first all-female law firm.

== Early life and education ==
Zetzer was born in East Baltimore, Maryland in 1904, to Russian immigrants Jacob, a butcher and Balia Zetzer. She was the eldest of three siblings. Her decision to become an attorney came after a discussion in the 8th grade about whether women should have the right to vote. She attended Eastern High School, where she was trained as a stenographer, and received her undergraduate degree from Johns Hopkins University. She then pursued a law degree from University of Maryland Law School and began practicing law immediately after her graduation in 1925.

== Career ==
Zetzer's first client paid her in candy, the second in "hose" due to a societal reluctance to give women money. She first attempted to join the Maryland State Bar Association in 1927, but was repeatedly rejected due to her sex. She was finally admitted in 1946, becoming the bar's first female member 21 years after she had begun practicing law.

Zetzer helped found the Women's Bar Association in 1927 and served as its president for several years. She was also vice-president of the National Association of Women Lawyers. She was the first woman to serve on the board of the Legal Aid Bureau, and along with her work on women's rights, focused on legal aid for people who couldn't afford representation and Jewish organizations like Hadassah and the Jewish Big Brother League. She, along with Jeanette Wolman, would march with the Suffragettes.

In 1940 Zetzer formed Maryland's first all female law-firm, Zetzer, Carton, Friedler & Parke. She had worked alone until then, because no firm would hire her as a lawyer in Maryland. She and Anna Carton established their own all-female firm, with the other two partners joining them later. She was friends and colleagues with another University of Maryland graduate and lawyer for women's rights, Marjorie Cook.

During this time, women had no right to sit on juries, even after they had gained the right to vote with the passage of the Nineteenth Amendment to the U.S. Constitution in 1920. The decision was left to states, and most, including Maryland, did not allow women to participate. Zetzer campaigned continuously for women to gain this right, arguing against excuses like the courtroom topics being too improper for women to hear, or the lack of appropriate bathrooms in Baltimore City courthouses. In 1947, due to the efforts of her and other activists, a partial women's jury service bill passed in the Maryland General Assembly. She argued to repeal laws that discriminated against women, and lobbied the U.S. Congress to establish the right of married women to work and pass the Equal Rights Amendment.

A Jewish woman, Zetzer applied to become the first female assistant in the State's attorney's office of Baltimore City in the 1950s, but was ultimately denied the position "as a matter of religion".

== Later life and death ==
Zetzer was inducted into the Baltimore City Hall of Fame in 1990. She retired in the early 1990s, and died of heart failure on April 5, 1998.

The University of Maryland Law School established a fellowship in her honor: the Rose Zetzer Fellowship Program. It promotes leadership and equality for women in law, and rewards students who are educated on women's policy issues.
