= Mabel Hubbard =

Mabel Hubbard may refer to:

- Mabel Gardiner Hubbard (1857–1923), American businesswoman
- Mabel Houze Hubbard (1936–2006), American judge
