= Maureen Black =

American pediatric psychologist

- Born: Maureen McEvoy; 1945 (age 80–81); Tacoma, Washington, U.S.
- Education: Pennsylvania State University; University of Southern California; Emory University
- Spouse: Robert Edward Black
- Children: 2
- Awards: Maryland Women's Hall of Fame (2012)
- Scientific career
- Fields: Pediatric psychology, early childhood development, nutrition
- Workplaces: University of Maryland School of Medicine

Maureen McEvoy Black (born 1945) is an American pediatric psychologist and expert in early childhood development. She specializes in growth and nutrition. Black was the John A. Scholl MD and Mary Louise Scholl MD Endowed Professor at the University of Maryland School of Medicine from 2003 to 2021.

== Life ==
Black was born in 1945 in Tacoma, Washington and raised in Altoona, Pennsylvania. In 1967, she earned a B.A. in mathematics and computer science from Pennsylvania State University. She was a systems analyst at IBM in New York, Philadelphia, London, and Los Angeles.

In 1973, she earned an M.A. in occupational therapy and psychology at the University of Southern California. Black completed a Ph.D. in psychology at Emory University in 1977. Her dissertation was titled, The relationship between teaching methods and the development of organizational skills in young children. Howard A. Rollins was the director of her Black's thesis. She helped undernourished children while living in Bangladesh and Peru for a number of years. Black completed a fellowship in developmental disabilities at the University of California, Los Angeles neuropsychiatric institute.

She is a pediatric psychologist and early childhood development expert. Black joined the department of pediatrics at the University of Maryland School of Medicine. She served as chief of its division of growth and nutrition. From 2003 to 2021, Black was the John A. Scholl MD and Mary Louise Scholl MD Endowed Professor. In 2012, she was inducted into the Maryland Women's Hall of Fame. She is an adjunct professor at the Johns Hopkins Bloomberg School of Public Health and the University of Maryland, Baltimore County. She is a fellow of the American Psychological Association.

As of 2012, Black lived in Anne Arundel County, Maryland with her husband, Robert Edward Black. They have two daughters.
