= Sonia Pressman Fuentes =

American writer and lawyer (1928-2026)

Sonia P. Fuentes
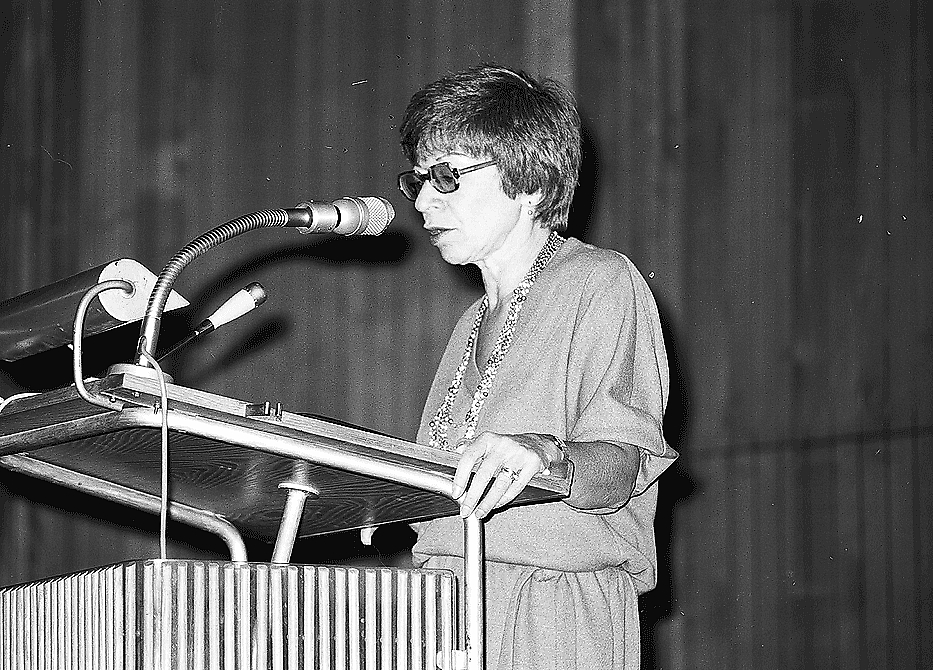
- Born: Sonia Pressman; May 30, 1928; Berlin, Germany
- Died: December 20, 2025 (aged 97); Sarasota, Florida, United States of America
- Education: Cornell University (BA); University of Miami (LLB)
- Occupations: Lawyer, writer

Sonia Pressman Fuentes (May 30, 1928 – December 20, 2025) was a Polish-Jewish American author, speaker, feminist leader, and lawyer.

== Early years and education ==
Fuentes was born in Berlin, Germany, to Polish-Jewish parents with whom she came to the U.S. to escape the Holocaust. She graduated from Cornell University and the University of Miami School of Law.

In early 1970s, she married Roberto Fuentes, a Chief of the Biostatistics Division with the District of Columbia Department of Human Resources. They had one daughter, Zia Fuentes Jones, born in 1972.

== Career ==
In the U.S., she became one of the founders of the second wave of the women's movement. She was a co-founder of the National Organization for Women (NOW) and Federally Employed Women (FEW), and she was one of the first woman lawyers in the Equal Employment Opportunity Commission (EEOC). She contributed to several early sexual discrimination cases by connecting complainants with feminist lawyers outside the EEOC.

Fuentes was the author of a memoir, Eat First—You Don't Know What They'll Give You, The Adventures of an Immigrant Family and Their Feminist Daughter (1999). Her articles on women's rights and other subjects have been published in newspapers, magazines, and journals in the U.S. and other countries.

She was a member of the Maryland Women's Hall of Fame. Since 1994, she resided in Sarasota, Florida.

Her papers are archived in the Schlesinger Library at Harvard University.

== Later life and death ==
Fuentes died on December 20, 2025, at the age of 97.

== Awards ==
- Foremother Award from the National Center for Health Research.
