= Brigid Leventhal =

British-American pediatric oncologist

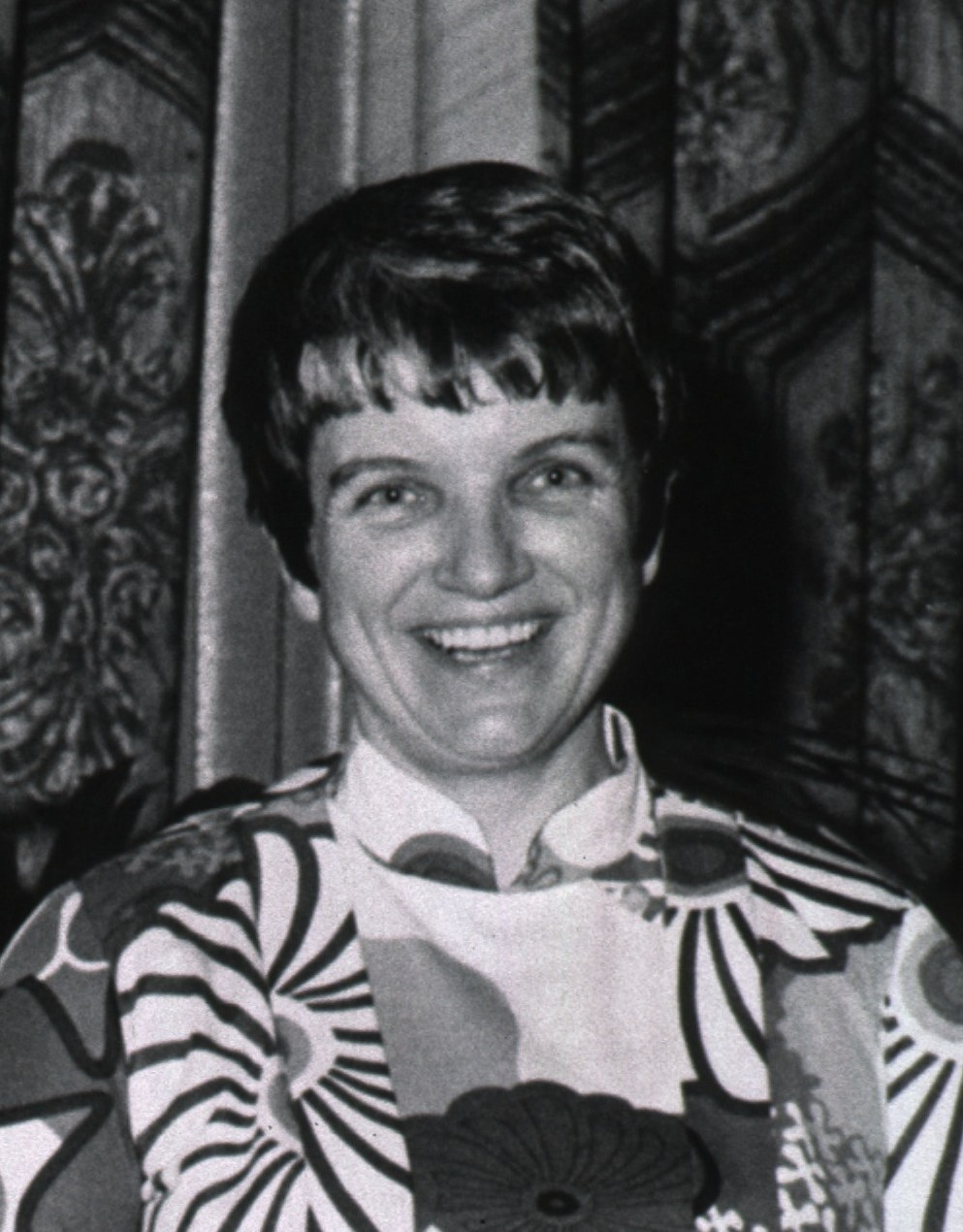
Brigid Leventhal

Brigid Gray Leventhal (August 31, 1935 – February 6, 1994) was a British-American pediatric oncologist. She was the first director of the Pediatric Oncology Division at Johns Hopkins University, a position she held from 1976 to 1984. She was inducted into the Maryland Women's Hall of Fame in 1996.

== Early life ==
Leventhal was born Brigid Gray in 1935 in London. Her family migrated to Los Angeles in 1940 to escape the Blitz. After graduating from Hollywood High School in 1950, she studied for a year at a Swiss boarding school before enrolling at UCLA. She graduated in psychology from UCLA in 1955 and began to study medicine there before transferring to Harvard Medical School. When she graduated from Harvard in 1960, she was one of only six women in her graduating class.

== Career ==
After completing medical school, Leventhal was an intern and pediatric resident at Massachusetts General Hospital. She served as a resident at Boston City Hospital for one year and completed a one-year fellowship in hematology at St. Elizabeth's Medical Center. In 1964, she moved to Bethesda, Maryland, to work at the National Cancer Institute. At the NCI, she sat on the Recombinant DNA Advisory Committee and a subcommittee on human gene therapy; she headed the Chemoimmunotherapy Section from 1973 to 1976. Leventhal was hired by Johns Hopkins University in 1976 as a professor of pediatrics and oncology and the first director of Johns Hopkins' Pediatric Oncology Division. While developing new treatments for childhood cancers, she established the inpatient unit and outpatient clinics for pediatric oncology patients. She stepped down as head of the Pediatric Oncology Division in 1984. During her career, Leventhal published 135 research papers, 52 book chapters, and a textbook titled Research Methods in Clinical Oncology.

Leventhal died of cancer in 1994 in Columbia, Maryland.

== Honors ==
Leventhal received the Federal Women's Award in 1974 and was named Outstanding Career Woman in 1979 by the National Council of Women. In 1992, Baltimore Mayor Kurt Schmoke designated July 29 as Brigid G. Leventhal Day in Baltimore. Leventhal was posthumously inducted into the Maryland Women's Hall of Fame in 1996.
