= Edyth Schoenrich =

American physician and academic (1919–2020)

- Born: Edyth Maud Hull; September 9, 1919; Cleveland, Ohio, U.S.
- Died: September 12, 2020 (aged 101); Ruxton, Maryland, U.S.
- Occupations: Educator; physician
- Spouse: Carlos Schoenrich (m. 1942; died 2002)
- Children: 2
- Awards: Maryland Women's Hall of Fame

Academic background
- Education: Duke University (BA); University of Chicago School of Medicine (MD); Johns Hopkins Bloomberg School of Public Health (MPH)

Edyth Schoenrich (née Hull; September 9, 1919 – September 12, 2020) was a doctor and professor at the Johns Hopkins Bloomberg School of Public Health.

== Early life ==
Edyth Maud Hull was born on September 9, 1919, in Cleveland, Ohio, to Maud Mabel (née Kelly) and Edwin John Hull, a chemical engineer. She grew up in a multi-generational home known as the Fairmont House. She graduated from a Cleveland high school. She received a B.A. from Duke University in 1941 and then did graduate work in psychology there. One of only three female students, she received a M.D. from the University of Chicago School of Medicine in 1947.

She completed an internal medicine internship and residency at the Johns Hopkins Hospital from 1948 to 1952 and served as chief resident from 1951 to 1952. She was one of the first to enroll part-time in a Master of Public Health program at the Johns Hopkins Bloomberg School of Public Health. She received the M.P.H. in 1971.

== Personal life ==
She married Carlos Schoenrich in 1942. They met as graduate students at Duke University. He died in 2002. Together, they had two children: Lola and Olaf.

In the 1980s, she took up the hobby of hot air ballooning. She was an avid gardener and opera fan.

== Career ==
Schoenrich joined the Department of Medicine as an instructor of medicine at the Johns Hopkins School of Medicine in 1953. She was on staff at the Baltimore City Hospital from 1963 to 1966 and was an advocate for comprehensive care for severely ill patients with long hospitalizations.

In 1964, Schoenrich while working at the Maryland State Department of Health and Mental Hygiene, she started teaching at the Bloomberg School of Public Health as an associate professor. In 1966, she was promoted to an assistant professor.

In 1971, she was the first woman appointed to the American Board of Preventive Medicine. In the same year, she was appointed Director of the Administration of the Chronically Ill and Aging, part of Maryland's Department of Health and Mental Hygiene. At that time, she was already in charge of all state programs for disease control and prevention, two tuberculosis hospitals, and three hospitals for chronic disease and rehabilitation. She was promoted to professor in 1974 and directed the Division of Public Health Administration until 1977. She was the seventh women in the School's history to become a full professor.

In 1977, Schoenrich was appointed by D.A. Henderson as the first female associate dean at Johns Hopkins University when the Bloomberg School named her Associate Dean of Academic Affairs. She held this role until 1986. She was also the director of Part-time Professional Programs. She helped modernize the School's programs, its clinical and practice experience, and the transformation of the General Preventive Medicine Residency. From 1986 to 2018, she served as the associate chair of the Master of Public Health program.

== Death ==
Schoenrich died on September 12, 2020, from congestive heart failure at her home in Ruxton, Maryland. She was 101 years old.

== Awards ==
- 2005, Maryland Women's Hall of Fame inductee
- 2007, Excellence in Teaching Award, Johns Hopkins University’s Alumni Association
- Ernest Lyman Stebbins Medal, Johns Hopkins
- Golden Apple teaching award, Johns Hopkins

In 1996, the Bloomberg School established the Edyth Schoenrich Professorship in Preventive Medicine and the Edyth Schoenrich Scholarship to honor her work and legacy.
