= Evelyn O. A. Darden =

American civil rights lawyer

- Born: Annapolis, Maryland, U.S.
- Education: Morgan State University; University of Maryland, Baltimore
- Children: 1
- Awards: Maryland Women's Hall of Fame (2020)

Evelyn O. A. Darden is an American civil rights lawyer and former prosecutor who served as an assistant attorney general for the State of Maryland. She was one of the first African American women to hold that position and later established Addison-Darden, the first Black mother-son law firm in Maryland. Darden received the 2003 Maryland Trial Lawyer of the Year Award for her role in a class-action juvenile abuse lawsuit against the state and was inducted into the Maryland Women's Hall of Fame in 2020.

== Early life and education ==
Darden is a native of Annapolis, Maryland, and grew up in the small African American community of Browns Woods. She was homeschooled by her mother at the ages of four and five. Her mother, who later served as a pastor at All Fellows United Methodist Church, had been unable to attend high school herself because no transportation was provided for Black students in Anne Arundel County at the time. Darden's grandmother, Beulah, served as an early inspiration for her interest in advocacy.

Darden attended Wiley H. Bates High School, where she was a majorette. Darden taught science for five years at Lemmel Junior High School. She is a graduate of Morgan State University and the University of Maryland Francis King Carey School of Law. During law school, Darden considered quitting but was persuaded to remain by professor Chandler, one of only two African American professors at the school. She also completed the Harvard Law School Institute for Lawyers, focusing on class action torts and Constitutional law. Darden became the eleventh African American woman admitted to the Maryland Bar.

== Career ==
Darden's legal career began in 1976 at the firm Johnson and Smith under the mentorship of civil rights lawyer Kenneth L. Johnson. She worked as an associate at the firm and later as a supervisory trial attorney for the Baltimore District Office of the U.S. Equal Employment Opportunity Commission (EEOC). In these roles, she handled Title VII class action cases against Fortune 500 companies.

Darden was among the first African American women to serve as an assistant attorney general for the State of Maryland. In January 1983, she joined the Baltimore City State's Attorney's Office under Kurt Schmoke, where she was assigned to the special narcotics and homicide units. On April 1, 1988, she founded Addison-Darden, which became the first Black mother-son law firm in Maryland after her son, Skip Darden, joined the practice.

Her private practice experience included a five-year partnership with trial attorney Johnnie Cochran. In 2002, Cochran nominated her for the National Trial Lawyer of the Year for Public Justice Award. Darden served two terms on the board of governors for the Maryland Trial Attorneys, where she lobbied for the repeal of the Parent-Child Immunity Law in Maryland.

Darden received the Maryland Trial Lawyer of the Year Award for securing a $4.5 million settlement in the case Gary J. vs. State of Maryland. In 2003, her firm was named Trial Lawyers of the Year by the Maryland Trial Lawyers Association for this class-action case, which concerned juvenile abuse. In 2020, Darden was inducted into both the Maryland Women's Hall of Fame and the Howard County Women's Hall of Fame.

== Personal life ==
Evelyn Darden married Mark Darden in 1965 after completing her second year of college. She later donated a kidney to her husband when he required a transplant. As of 2020, she is a resident of Howard County, Maryland.

In December 2016, through her cousin Dale Green, Darden discovered she is a descendant of reverend Samuel Green Sr., a first cousin of Harriet Tubman. Darden served on the board of directors for the YWCA of Annapolis and Anne Arundel County. She served as the chairman of the Bates Legacy Center for four years.
