= Charlotte Cooksey =

Retired American jurist from Maryland

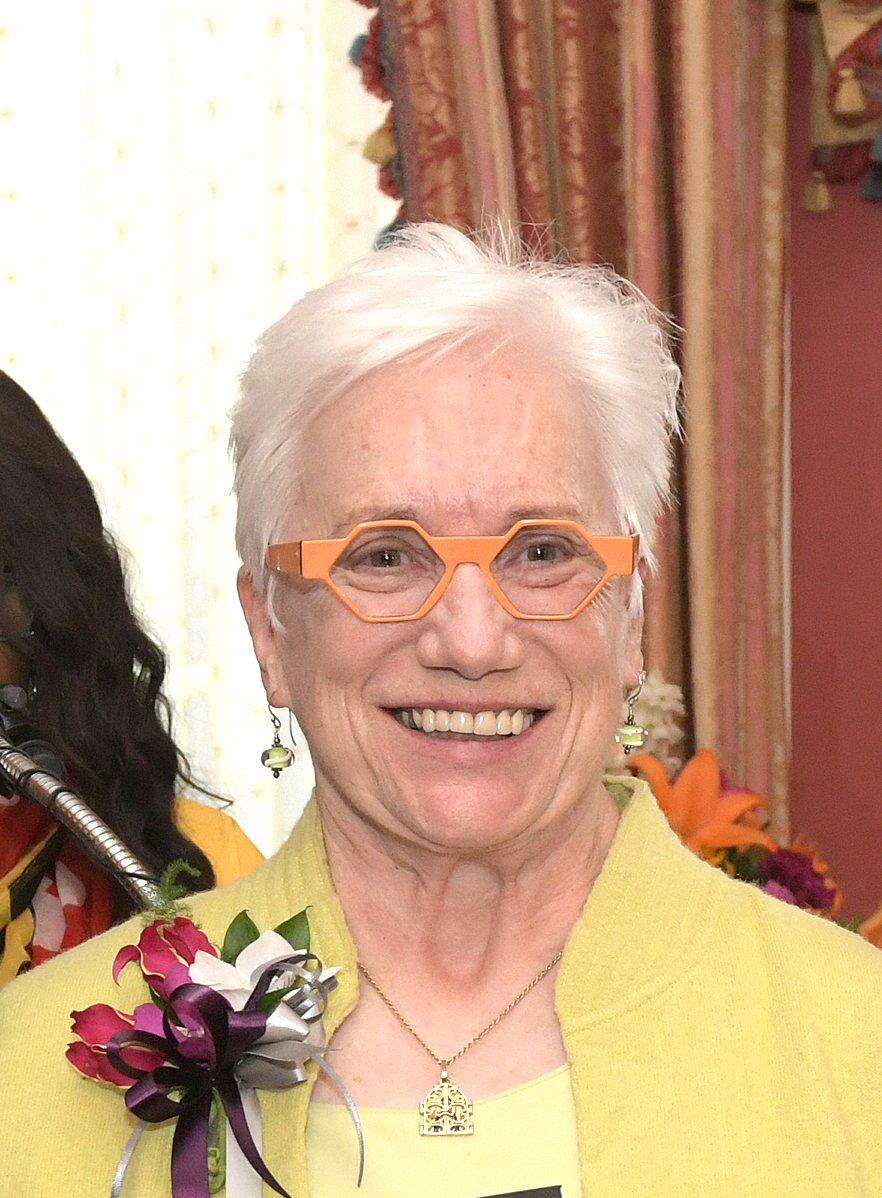
- In 2023, Cooksey was inducted to the Maryland Women Hall of Fame
- Born: October 30, 1947 (age 78); Baltimore, Maryland
- Education: Tulane University, BA; Loyola University New Orleans College of Law, J.D.
- Occupation: Judge
- Years active: 1983–2008
- Employer(s): District Court of Maryland, District 1, Baltimore City
- Known for: Establishing the first mental health court in Maryland

Charlotte M. Cooksey (born October 30, 1947) is a retired American judge from Baltimore, Maryland. While a serving judge, Cooksey was notable for advocating for women and for mental health. She established Maryland's first mental health court, a program that would later expand across the country. For her work as a judge and for mental health, in 2023 Cooksey was named to the Maryland Women's Hall of Fame.

== Biography ==
=== Early life and education ===
Charlotte M. Cooksey was born on October 30, 1947, in Baltimore, Maryland. She grew up in Louisiana, where she would pursue an undergraduate degree from Tulane University. She graduated with a B.A. in 1968. In 1971, she received her Juris Doctor from Loyola University School of Law.

=== Legal career ===
Cooksey returned to Maryland to continue her legal career at Maryland Legal Aid in Baltimore. She received her first position in the court system in 1979, as a Master in Chancery, Division of Juvenile Causes, at Baltimore's City Circuit Court. In 1983 at age 35, she was appointed as an Associate Judge to Maryland's District 1 Court, covering Baltimore City. She would serve in the role for the next twenty five years.

In 1998, Cooksey led a nationally recognized truancy program intervention targeting chronically absent teenagers at Baltimore's Canton Middle School. Rather than punishing the children, the program held parents responsible for their children's school absences. The program resulted in increased attendance rates and a drop of daytime crime by 20 percent.

In Maryland, she was noted as one of the first jurists to recognize the criminalization of the mentally ill, and the biological basis of addiction. She highlighted that American jails had become the largest de facto mental hospitals in the United States, and sought to find a solution. In 2002, she developed Baltimore's Mental Health Court, the first court of its kind in Maryland and one of the first mental health courts in the United States. The Mental Health court serves defendants with mental health diagnoses with a problem solving, rather than adversarial approach. It has since expanded beyond Baltimore's District 1.

Cooksey further advocated on behalf of the incarcerated, acting as a whistleblower and speaking out about inhumane conditions in Maryland's jails during a severe heatwave. Later, she worked with former judge Ellen M. Heller to establish Tamar's Children, a program for incarcerated prisoners who were pregnant.

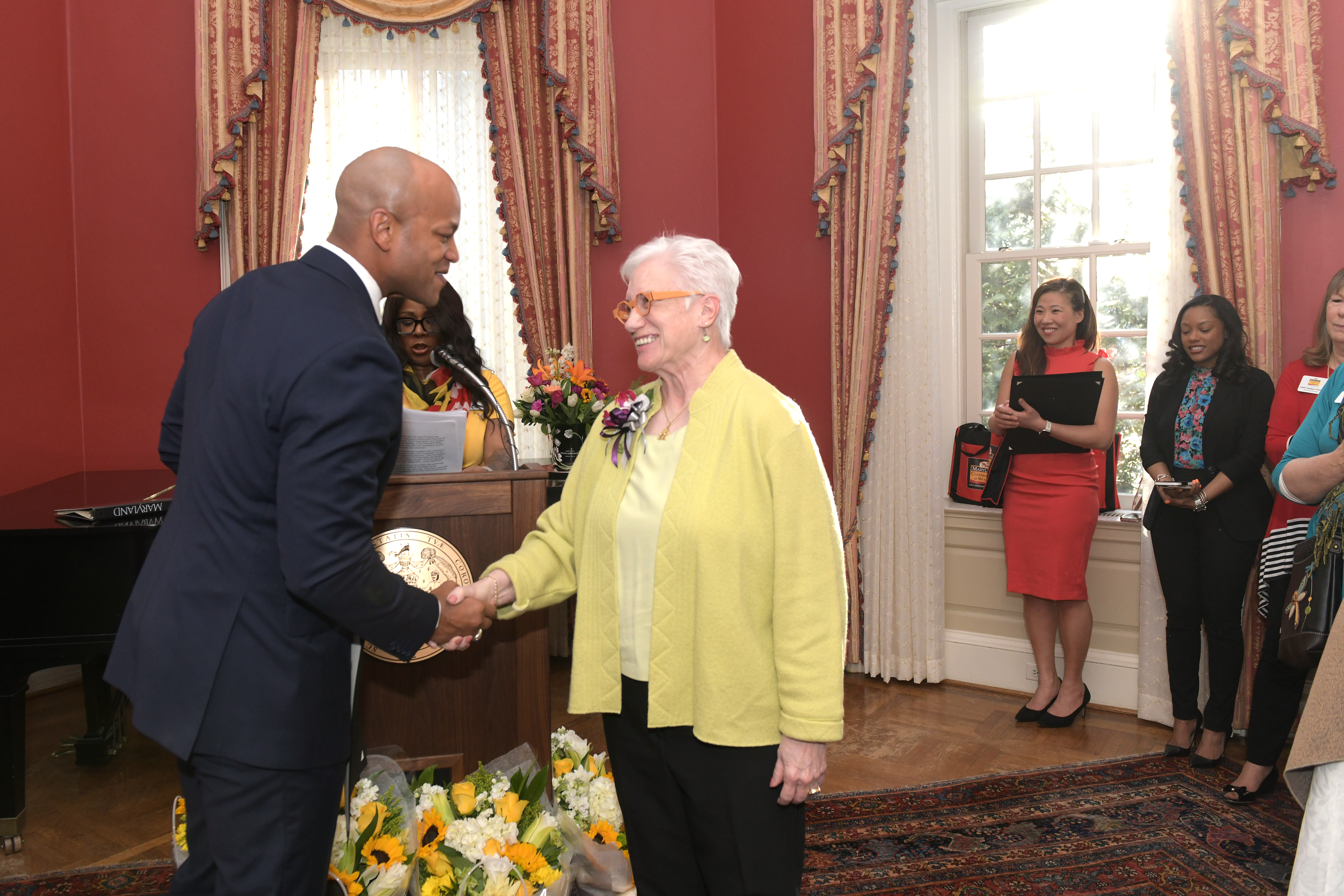
Cooksey inducted into the Maryland Women's Hall of Fame in 2023.

=== Retirement and legacy ===
Judge Cooksey retired from the bench in 2008. In 2012, Cooksey wrote the State of Maryland's Mental Health Procedures handbook, which was still being used by the state's judicial system over a decade later.

In 2023, she was named to the Maryland Women's Hall of Fame for her contributions to the legal community in Maryland.

== Publications ==
- Mental Health Procedures Handbook. Prepared by the Hon. Charlotte M. Cooksey (Ret.) District Court of Maryland 2014

== See also ==
- Mentally ill prisoners in the United States
- Therapeutic jurisprudence
