= Maryland Women's Hall of Fame =

Award

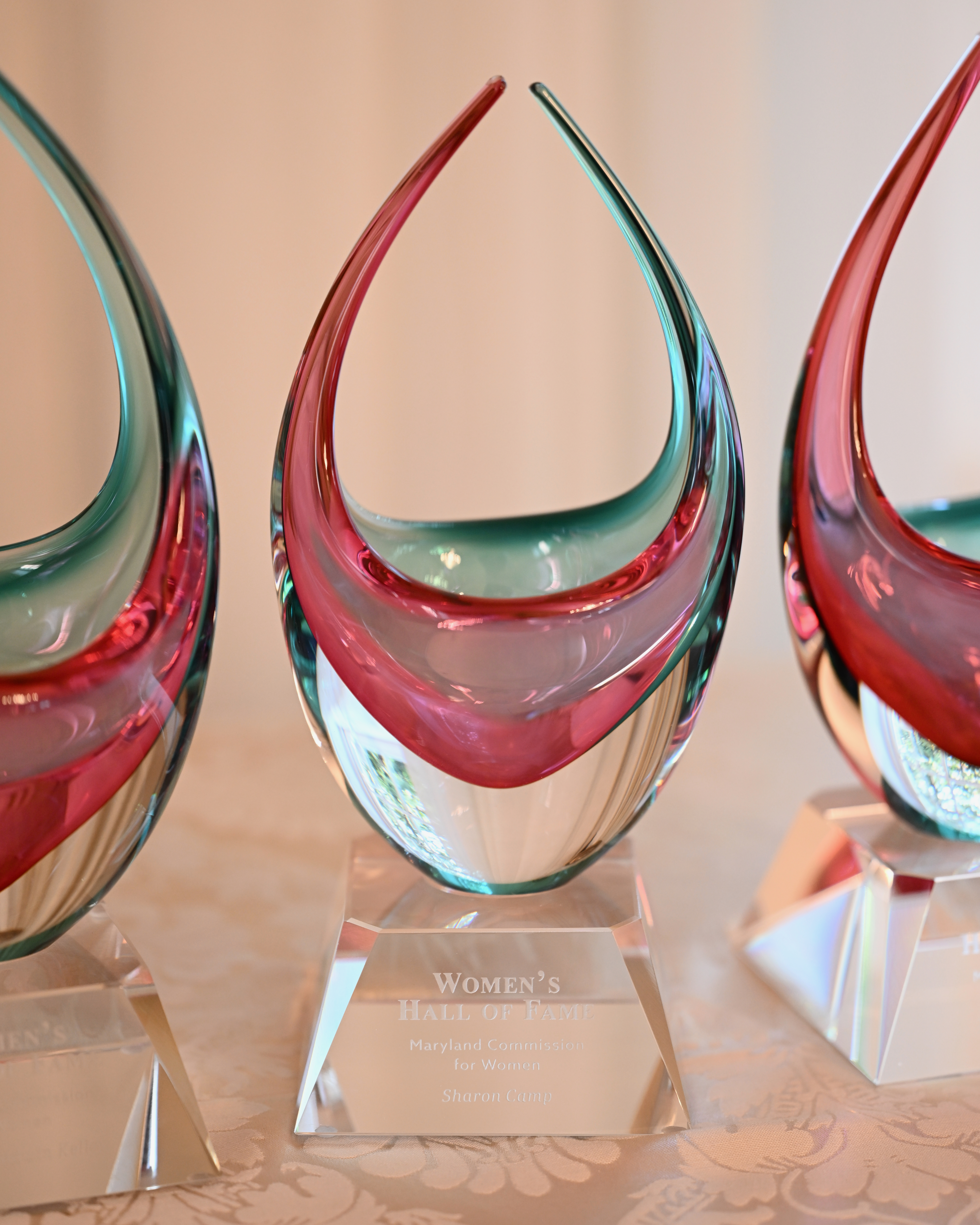
One of the 2026 awards

The Maryland Women's Hall of Fame (MWHF) recognizes significant achievements and statewide contributions made by women who are Maryland-natives or state residents. It was established in 1985 by the Maryland Commission for Women and the Women Legislators of Maryland. Honorees are selected by an independent committee each year and are inducted in March during Women's History Month.

== Inductees ==
Name	Image	Birth–Death	Year	Area of achievement	Ref(s)
Sharon Camp		(1943–2025)	2026	Women's reproductive health advocate	
Wendy Chun-Hoon			2026	President and executive director of the Center for Law and Social Policy	
Annunciata Lombardi D'Alesandro		(1909–1995)	2026	Political strategist, social worker, entrepreneur, and wife of Baltimore mayor Thomas D'Alesandro Jr.	
Margaret Oakley Dayhoff		(1925–1983)	2026	Biophysicist and pioneer in the field of bioinformatics	
Elda Devarie			2026	Entrepreneur and founder of E.M.D. Sales, Inc.	
Delores G. Kelley		(b. 1936)	2026	Former state delegate (1991–1995) and state senator (1995–2023); first African American person elected to the Maryland General Assembly from Baltimore County	
Emily Perez		(1983–2006)	2026	First African American and first Latina woman to serve as cadet command sergeant major, and the first African American female officer in U.S. military history to be killed in combat	
Susan Turnbull		(b. 1952)	2026	Former chair of the Maryland Democratic Party and vice chair of the Democratic National Committee	
Donna Abbott			2025	First woman chief of a Maryland tribe in known recorded history	
Maggie McIntosh		(b. 1947)	2025	First woman to chair the Appropriations Committee in the Maryland House of Delegates	
Joseline Peña-Melnyk		(b. 1966)	2025	Highest-ranking Latina in the Maryland General Assembly	
Kathleen Kennedy Townsend		(b. 1951)	2025	First female lieutenant governor of Maryland	
Adrienne A. Jones		(b. 1954)	2024	First female and first African-American Speaker of the Maryland House of Delegates	
Susan C. Lee		(b. 1954)	2024	First Asian American to serve as Maryland Secretary of State, first Asian American to be elected to the Maryland Senate, and first Chinese American and first Asian American woman to serve and be elected to the Maryland House of Delegates	
Brooke Lierman		(b. 1979)	2024	34th Comptroller of Maryland, first female Comptroller and first woman to be elected to an independent state government office in Maryland; member of the Maryland House of Delegates from 2015 to 2023	
Aruna Miller		(b. 1964)	2024	10th Lieutenant Governor of Maryland, first immigrant elected to a statewide office; member of the Maryland House of Delegates from 2010 to 2019	
Nancy Pelosi		(b. 1940)	2024	First woman to serve as Speaker of the U.S. House of Representatives from 2007 to 2011 and from 2019 to 2023	
Janeen L. Birckhead		(b. 1969)	2023	Brigadier General, Commander of the Maryland Army National Guard, Assistant Adjutant General, Maryland Joint Force Headquarters, Baltimore, Maryland; Deputy Commanding General-Reserve Affairs, United States Army War College, Carlisle, Pennsylvania	
Charlotte M. Cooksey		(b. 1947)	2023	District Court of Maryland, District 1, the first presiding judge of Baltimore's Mental Health Court	
Ana Sol Gutierrez		(b. 1942)	2023	Maryland House of Delegates from District 18, first Latina elected to state office	
Gloria G. Lawlah		(b. 1939)	2023	Secretary of the Maryland Department of Aging, Maryland state senator from the 26th district	
Jackie Ronne		(1919–2009)	2023	Antarctic expedition (1947–48)	
Dorothy Blum		(1924–1980)	2022	Computer pioneer, cryptanalyst	
Mary L. Cleave		(1947–2023)	2022	American engineer and a former astronaut	
Gloria Richardson		(1922–2021)	2022	Civil rights activist	
Beatrice Rodgers			2022	Community activist for people with disabilities	
Odessa M. Shannon		(1928–2020)	2022	Founder of the Montgomery County Human Rights Hall of Fame; recipient of the Lifetime Achievement Award for Volunteerism from President Barack Obama	
Elizabeth Bobo		(b. 1943)	2021	Elected to serve as the Howard County Chief Executive, served 20 years as a representative in the Maryland House of Delegates, and served on the Howard County Council.	
Margaret Briggs Gregory Hawkins		(1877–1969)	2021	Educator, suffragist	
Ruby Reese Moone		(b. 1938)	2021	Civil rights	
Nancy K. Welker		(b. 1941)	2021	Physicist, expert in superconducting electronics	
Celeste Revillon Winans		(1823–1861)	2021	Ran a soup house for the poor	
Victorine Quille Adams		(1912–2006)	2020	Baltimore City Council	
Evelyn O. A. Darden			2020	Lawyer	
Claire L. Parkinson		(b. 1948)	2020	Climate Scientist	
Nancy Grace Roman		(1925–2018)	2020	Astronomer	
Leslie R. Wolfe		(1943–2017)	2020	Women's rights leader	
Marielsa A. Bernard			2019	Senior Judge of the Circuit Court for Montgomery County	
Augusta T. Chissell		(1880–1973)	2019	Suffragist; Vice President of Baltimore NAACP	
Dominique Dawes		(b. 1976)	2019	Olympic champion gymnast	
Virginia Hall		(1906–1982)	2019	Intelligence officer in Vichy France during World War II	
Rosa Gumataotao Rios		(b. 1956)	2019	43rd Treasurer of the United States	
Evelyn Williams Townsend		(1922–2008)	2019	Community activist; President of the Harriet Tubman Museum and Educational Center	
Phyllis B. Trickett		(b. 1927)	2019	Community activist; equal rights	
Pauline Woo Tsui		(1920–2018)	2019	Anti-discrimination activist; co-founder of the Organization of Chinese American Women	
Sandra I. Barnes			2018	Child welfare advocate; Assistant Attorney General, Maryland Department of Human Services	
Sandra Williams Ortega		(b. 1937)	2018	Maryland's first African American woman commissioned as a U.S. Air Force Officer, community service	
Emily Saunders Plummer		(1815–1876)	2018	Former slave	
Rita L. Robinson		(1936–2019)	2018	Professor at Bowie State University	
Hattie N. Washington			2018	Professor of Education at Coppin State University	
Marsha Coleman-Adebayo		(b. 1952)	2017	Founder of the No FEAR Institute, an organization devoted to educating the American public about federal sector discrimination and the implementation of the No FEAR Act.	
Carolyn Colvin		(b. 1942)	2017	Deputy Commissioner for Social Security	
Donna Edwards		(b. 1958)	2017	First African American woman to represent Maryland in the US House of Representatives	
Mary Garrett		(1854–1915)	2017	Suffragist and philanthropist	
Katharine Blodgett Gebbie		(1932–2016)	2017	Astrophysicist	
Kathleen Ledecky		(b. 1997)	2017	Olympic gold medalist for swimming	
Helen Maroulis		(b. 1991)	2017	Gold medalist 2015 World Wrestling Championships	
Lilian Welsh		(1858–1938)	2017	Physician, educator, suffragist	
Sophia Arabatzis Balis		(1930–2018)	2016	Professor Emeritus of the University of Maryland Dental School	
Oretha Bridgwaters-Simms			2016	Educator	
Mary C. Goodwillie		(1870–1949)	2016	Established the Junior League of Baltimore	
Elaine Danforth Harmon		(1919–2015)	2016	2009 Congressional Gold Medal for U.S. Women Airforce Service Pilots (WASP) during World War II	
Joanne Katz			2016	President of the Faculty Senate of the Johns Hopkins Bloomberg School of Public Health, Institutional Review Board chair	
Lizette Woodworth Reese		(1856–1935)	2016	Poet	
Beverly B. Byron		(1932–2025)	2015	U.S. House of Representatives	
E. Gail de Planque		(1945–2010)	2015	Physicist, U.S. Nuclear Regulatory Commission	
Mary Feik		(1924–2016)	2015	Aviation, pilot, flight engineer, master mechanic	
Katherine O'Brien		(b. 1963)	2015	Physician, member of the World Health Organization's Scientific Advisory Group of Experts on Immunization (SAGE)	
Linda L. Singh		(b. 1964)	2015	Adjutant General of the Maryland National Guard	
Sue Fryer Ward		(1935–2014)	2015	Government service, advocate for human rights	
Dorothy F. Bailey			2014	Civic activist	
Agnes Kane Callum		(1926–2015)	2014	Founding member of the Baltimore Afro American Historical Genealogic Society	
Renee E. Fox			2014	Executive director of the Institute for a Healthiest Maryland	
Susan K. Goering		(b. 1952)	2014	Civil rights attorney	
Henrietta Lacks		(1920–1951)	2014	HeLa the oldest and most commonly used human cell line came from cervical cancer cells taken from Lacks.	
Ann Cipriano Rees		(b. 1943)	2014	Philanthropist	
Helen Delich Bentley		(1923–2016)	2013	Member of the U.S. House of Representatives from 1985 to 1995	
Jean B. Cryor		(1938–2009)	2013	Member of the Maryland House of Delegates for District 15	
Charlene Mickens Dukes		(b. 1954)	2013	President of Prince George's Community College	
Ellen R. Sauerbrey		(b. 1937)	2013	Former head of the United States Department of State's Bureau of Population, Refugees, and Migration	
Linda A. Shevitz			2013	Equity Office Director at the Maryland State Department of Education	
Beatrice P. Tignor		(b. 1940)	2013	Maryland House of Delegates	
Maureen Black		(b. 1945)	2012	Physician	
Margaret Dunkle		(b. 1947)	2012	Equal opportunities for women in athletics	
Nancy K. Kopp		(b. 1943)	2012	Treasurer of Maryland	
Alice Manicur		(1924–2017)	2012	Educator	
Diana Gribbon Motz		(b. 1943)	2012	United States Court of Appeals for the Fourth Circuit	
Gwendolyn Rooks			2012	Community service	
Carol W. Greider		(b. 1961)	2011	Molecular biologist	
Barbara Holdridge		(1929–2025)	2011	Co-founder Caedmon Records, founder Stemmer House Publishers	
Ligia Peralta		(b. 1961)	2011	University of Maryland School of Medicine	
Gertrude Poe		(1915–2017)	2011	Journalist	
Lucy Diggs Slowe		(1885–1937)	2011	Advocate for black women	
June A. Willenz		(1924–2020)	2011	Author, military veterans advocate; Executive Director of the American Veterans Committee (AVC)	
Claire M. Fraser		(b. 1955)	2010	Microbiologist	
Anne Catharine Hoof Green		(c. 1720–1775)	2010	Publisher The Maryland Gazette	
Irene Morgan Kirkaldy		(1917–2007)	2010	Jailed in 1944 for refusing to give up her seat to a white person on a Greyhound bus; 1946 Irene Morgan v. Commonwealth of Virginia, United States Supreme Court overturned Virginia state law requiring segregation on interstate transportation.	
Almira Hart Lincoln Phelps		(1793–1884)	2010	Educator, publisher	
Bernice R. Sandler		(1928–2019)	2010	Women's rights	
Lillie D. Shockney		(b. 1956)	2010	Leader in breast cancer treatment	
Ilia Fehrer		(1927–2007)	2009	Environmentalist	
Diane Griffin		(1940–2024)	2009	University Distinguished Professor, and a Professor in the Department of Molecular Microbiology and Immunology at the Johns Hopkins Bloomberg School of Public Health, department chair from 1994 to 2015	
Harriet Legum		(b. 1944)	2009	Advocate for research and treatment of women's breast cancer	
Allyson R. Solomon		(b. 1961)	2009	Brig. General, Maryland National Guard, Assistant Adjutant General, Air, Maryland National Guard	
Anne St. Clair Wright		(1910–1993)	2009	Historic preservationist	
Ramona McCarthy Hawkins		(1928–2018)	2008	Pharmacist	
Ellen Moses Heller		(b. 1941)	2008	Judge	
Billie Holiday		(1915–1959)	2008	Jazz singer	
Pauline Menes		(1924–2009)	2008	Maryland House of Delegates	
Toby Orenstein		(b. 1937)	2008	Patron of the arts	
Emily Wilson Walker		(1904–2007)	2008	Physician	
Annette M. Deener		(b. 1953)	2007	Brigadier General Maryland National Guard, Director MD Joint Staff Hdqt	
Sally T. Grant			2007	Volunteerism, women's right, co-founder of Maryland Women's Hall of Fame	
Prasanna Nair			2007	Primary Health Care physician, specifically with infants of mothers with HIV/AIDS or substance abuse issues	
Karen H. Rothenberg			2007	Dean, Marjorie Cook Professor of Law at the University of Maryland Law School	
Audrey E. Scott			2007	Community activist	
Susan P. Baker		(b. 1930)	2006	Doctor of Public Health	
Liebe Sokol Diamond		(1931–2017)	2006	Orthopedics	
Bea Gaddy		(1933–2001)	2006	City Council Woman, advocate for the poor and the homeless	
Marilyn Hughes Gaston		(b. 1939)	2006	Physician	
Rebecca Alban Hoffberger		(b. 1952)	2006	Founder American Visionary Art Museum	
Grace Snively		(1913–2014)	2006	Civil rights, community activism	
Shoshana Shoubin Cardin		(1926–2018)	2005	Philanthropist, volunteerism	
Bessie Olive Cole		(1883–1971)	2005	"First Lady of Maryland Pharmacy"	
Susan R. Panny		(b. 1943)	2005	Physician	
Edyth H. Schoenrich		(1919–2020)	2005	Health care	
Emily Edmonson		(1835–1895)	2004	Freed black woman, abolitionist	
Nancy T. Grasmick		(b. 1939)	2004	Former Maryland state Superintendent of Schools	
Esther McCready		(1931–2020)	2004	Nurse, educator	
Margaret Byrd Rawson		(1899–2001)	2004	Dyslexia research	
Vivian V. Simpson		(1903–1987)	2004	Lawyer	
Virginia Walcott Beauchamp		(1920–2019)	2003	Author, woman's advocate	
Edith Clarke		(1883–1959)	2003	First woman employed as an electrical engineer in the United States, as well as the country's first female professor of electrical engineering	
Kathryn J. DuFour		(1910–2005)	2003	Chief justice, Sixth Judicial Circuit Court of Maryland	
Ruth L. Kirschstein		(1926–2009)	2003	Pathologist	
Etta H. Maddox		(1860–1933)	2003	Lawyer, suffragist	
Deborah A. Yow		(b. 1950)	2003	Athletic Director for the University of Maryland	
Mabel Houze Hubbard		(1936–2006)	2002	Judge, first African-American woman to serve as a judge of the District Court of Maryland	
Florence Peterson Kendall		(1910–2006)	2002	Physical therapist	
Mary Young Pickersgill		(1776–1857)	2002	Flag maker during the War of 1812; sewed the Star-Spangled Banner (flag)	
Lorraine Sheehan		(1937–2009)	2002	Maryland General Assembly	
Kathleen Feeley		(b. 1929)	2001	Former president College of Notre Dame of Maryland	
Misbah Khan, MD, MPH, FAAP			2001	Pediatrician, medical school teacher and researcher, health policy advisor, and medical director for numerous community health programs	
Charmaine Krohe			2001	Founder St. Ambrose Family Outreach Center	
Eunice Kennedy Shriver		(1921–2009)	2001	Special Olympics	
Sandra W. Tomlinson		(1942–2000)	2001	Educator	
Constance Urciolo Battle		(b. 1941)	2000	Pediatrician	
Lois Green Carr		(1922–2015)	2000	Economic and social historian, specialist in the history of colonial Maryland	
Sonia Pressman Fuentes		(b. 1928)	2000	Co-founder National Organization for Women	
Josephine Jacobsen		(1908–2003)	2000	Poet, short story writer, critic	
Rosetta Stith		(1945–2017)	2000	Director of the Laurence G. Paquin Middle/Secondary School for Expectant Teenage Mothers	
Florence Riefle Bahr		(1909–1998)	1999	Artist	
Lillian C. Compton		(1884–1973)	1999	Educator	
Edith Houghton Hooker		(1879–1948)	1999	Suffragist, first woman accepted into Johns Hopkins University Medical School	
Elizabeth Fran Johnson		(1928–2025)	1999	Educator, volunteerism	
Bernice Smith White		(1924–2020)	1999	Community activist, women's equality	
Constance Ross Beims		(b. 1938)	1998	Educator	
Mary Katherine Goddard		(1738–1816)	1998	Publisher, postmistress	
Elaine Ryan Hedges		(1927–1997)	1998	Journalist with the Feminist Press	
Mary Carter Smith		(1919–2007)	1998	Poet, story teller	
Diane L. Adams		(b. 1948)	1997	Physician	
Sol del Ande Mendez Eaton		(1932–2020)	1997	Research chemist, civil rights, women's rights, health care	
Catherine R. Gira		(1932–2019)	1997	Educator	
Helen L. Koss		(1922–2008)	1997	Maryland House of Delegates	
Rosa Ponselle		(1897–1981)	1997	Opera singer, honored on a U.S. postage stamp	
Madeleine L. Ellicott		(1856–1945)	1996	Women's suffrage	
Ethel Llewellyn Ennis		(1932–2019)	1996	Jazz musician	
Mary Digges Lee		(1745–1805)	1996	Provided aid to George Washington's troops	
Brigid G. Leventhal		(1935–1994)	1996	Physician	
Barbara A. Robinson		(b. 1938)	1996	Maryland House of Delegates	
Jill Moss Greenberg		(b. 1943)	1995	Volunteerism, civil rights, women's rights	
Mary L. Nock		(1903–1987)	1995	Maryland General Assembly	
Amanda Taylor Norris		(1849–1944)	1995	First woman physician in Maryland	
Nettie Barcroft Taylor		(1914–2016)	1995	Library services	
Euphemia Mary Goldsborough Willson		(1836–1896)	1995	Nurse during the Civil War	
Rosalie Silber Abrams		(1916–2009)	1994	Maryland House of Delegates, Maryland State Senate, first female and Jewish majority leader of the state Senate.	
Mary Elizabeth Banning		(1822–1903)	1994	Mycologist, painter, naturalist	
Harriet Elizabeth Brown		(1907–2009)	1994	1937 legal case against Calvert County; was one of the foundations for the Maryland Teachers Pay Equalization Law	
Constance A. Morella		(b. 1931)	1994	United States Ambassador to the Organisation for Economic Co-operation and Development	
Mary Adelaide Nutting		(1858–1948)	1994	Nursing educator	
Rosalyn Blake Bell		(b. 1923)	1993	Judge	
Lucille Clifton		(1936–2010)	1993	Poet Laureate of Maryland	
Elizabeth King Ellicott		(1858–1914)	1993	Women's suffrage	
Jean Spencer		(1933–1992)	1993	Deputy Chancellor of the University of Maryland system	
Martha Ellicott Tyson		(1795–1873)	1993	Quaker elder, abolitionist, author	
Annie Armstrong		(1850–1938)	1992	Missionary	
Anna Ella Carroll		(1815–1894)	1992	Politician	
Rose Kushner		(1929–1990)	1992	Journalist, author of Why Me? What Every Woman Should Know About Breast Cancer to Save Her Life	
Margaret Collins Schweinhaut		(1904–1997)	1992	Maryland State Senate	
Carmen Delgado Votaw		(1934–2017)	1992	Civil rights	
Rita Colwell		(b. 1934)	1991	Environmental microbiologist	
Mary Elizabeth Lange		(1789–1882)	1991	Foundress of the Oblate Sisters of Providence	
Claire McCardell		(1905–1958)	1991	Fashion designer	
Bessie Moses		(1893–1965)	1991	Gynecologist and obstetrician who advocated birth control practices for women	
Alta Schrock		(1911–2001)	1991	First Mennonite woman in the United States to receive her doctoral degree	
Lucille Maurer		(1922–1996)	1990	Former Maryland Treasurer	
Enolia Pettigen McMillan		(1904–2006)	1990	First female national president NAACP	
Pauli Murray		(1910–1985)	1990	Activist, civil rights, women's rights	
Adele Hagner Stamp		(1893–1974)	1990	Dean of Women Emeritus from the University's Board of Regents	
Mary Lemist Titcomb		(1857–1932)	1990	Library services	
Bertha Sheppard Adkins		(1906–1983)	1989	Under Secretary of Health, Education, and Welfare under Dwight D. Eisenhower	
Eugenie Clark		(1922–2015)	1989	Ichthyologist	
Lavinia Margaret Engle		(1892–1979)	1989	Maryland House of Delegates, Montgomery County Board of Commissioners, organizer, National American Women's Suffrage Association, director and co-founder Maryland League of Women Voters, various positions within the Social Security Administration and the Welfare Administration.	
Lena King Lee		(1906–2006)	1989	Maryland House of Delegates	
Estelle R. Ramey		(1917–2006)	1989	Professor George Washington University Medical School	
Barbara A. Mikulski		(b. 1936)	1988	United States Senate	
Sadie Kneller Miller		(1867–1920)	1988	Photojournalist	
Mary Risteau		(1890–1978)	1988	Maryland House of Delegates	
Martha Carey Thomas		(1857–1935)	1988	Educator and feminist	
Verda Freeman Welcome		(1907–1990)	1988	Maryland State Senate	
Clara Barton		(1821–1912)	1987	Founder American Red Cross	
Frances Ellen Watkins Harper		(1824–1911)	1987	Author, poet, abolitionist	
Juanita Jackson Mitchell		(1913–1992)	1987	First African American woman to practice law in Maryland	
Mary Shaw Shorb		(1907–1990)	1987	Research scientist	
Helen Brooke Taussig		(1898–1986)	1987	Founded the field of pediatric cardiology	
Lillie Caroll Jackson		(1889–1975)	1986	Civil rights advocate, organized Baltimore branch of NAACP	
Elizabeth Ann Seton		(1774–1821)	1986	Roman Catholic Saint	
Henrietta Szold		(1860–1945)	1986	Educator, first president of Hadassah, the Women's Zionist Organization of America	
Jeanette Rosner Wolman		(1902–1999)	1986	Lawyer and woman's rights advocate	
Hiltgunt Zassenhaus		(1916–2004)	1986	German philologist who worked as an interpreter in Hamburg, Germany during World War II, and later as a physician in the United States	
Margaret Brent		(c.1601–c.1671)	1985	Estate owner, lawyer	
Rachel Carson		(1907–1964)	1985	Author Silent Spring	
Rita C. Davidson		(1928–1984)	1985	First woman on Maryland Court of Appeals	
Gladys Noon Spellman		(1918–1988)	1985	United States House of Representatives	
Harriet Ross Tubman		(1820–1913)	1985	Abolitionist; escaped slave and conductor on the Underground Railroad, suffragist	
