= Prasanna Nair =

Pediatric doctor

Prasanna Nair is an Indian-born doctor working in the United States. She works in primary health care with a specialty in pediatric endocrinology.

== Biography ==
Nair is originally from India and completed her medical training at Lady Hardinge Medical College in Delhi. In 1960 she moved to Maryland, US, and began her medical residency in pediatrics at the University of Maryland Medical Center. Nair passed the American Board of Pediatrics in 1965. In 1970 she became a Fellow of the American Academy of Pediatrics. In 1982 Nair received her master's degree in public health from the Johns Hopkins University School of Public Health. She is certified in pediatrics by the American Board of Pediatrics and her Maryland State Medical License was active until 2017.

Nair's work has been focused on helping and caring for children and adolescents, specifically infants of mothers with HIV/AIDS or substance use disorders. She has also spent time advocating for the education and commitment of medical students to advance the field of pediatric medicine. In 1970 Nair founded the Special Parent Infant Care and Enrichment (SPICE) clinic. The SPICE clinic endeavors to care for infants of HIV positive mothers at the University of Maryland. The SPICE clinic also refers mothers with drug dependencies to treatment programs. This project not only serves an at-risk population of children but also provides very important research and experience to the field of pediatric medicine. Dr. Nair worked as the director of the Community Pediatric Center from 1975 to 1985. The Community Pediatric Center was a federal project at the University of Maryland for children and youth and provided health care to inner city and low-income family children who would otherwise not have access to primary health care. From 1985 through 2000 she directed the Junior Year Pediatric Clerkship at the University of Maryland while working as an associate professor of pediatrics at the University of Maryland School of Medicine. Nair has served on numerous committees directed towards advocacy and research for children, particularly at-risk children, including children from low-income families, or children whose parents have HIV/AIDS or substance abuse disorders.

Nair is a co-investigator on the "Following Urban Teens: Unique and Resilient at Every Step" (FUTURES) project at the University of Maryland School of Medicine. The FUTURES project is a longitudinal study that is being funded by the National Institutes of Drug Abuse (NIDA). The FUTURES project followed 296 infants born at the University of Maryland Hospital. During the first two years of the children's lives, families participated in a randomized controlled home intervention. After that, researchers met with children and their caregivers twice a year until the children were 10 years old. During the visits data was collected on children's cognitive, behavioral, social, and psychological development. The data collected provided insights into how children who experience risk and protective factors develop over time. The data collection phase is complete and the data is being analyzed to determine the effects of prenatal substance exposure and social risk factors on the neurocognitive and social development of teenagers from low-income, urban environments. Now that the original participants are adolescents, the FUTURES project is currently assessing the effects of early childhood experiences such as substance exposure, environmental adversity, placement stability, and other factors related to resilience on adolescent development in collaboration with NIDA.

== Publications ==
Most of Nair's published research seeks to illuminate the medical history of HIV infection and transmission in children born to HIV infected mothers. Some of her publications include :

- Black, Maureen M., Linda F. Gerson, Claire A. B. Freeland, Prasanna Nair, John S. Rubin, Jacqueline J. Hutcheson. 1988.“Language Screening for Infants Prone to Otitis Media.” Journal of Pediatric Psychology 13, no. 3 (1988): 423–33.
- Nair, Prasanna, Maureen M Black, John P Ackerman, Maureen E Schuler, and Virginia A Keane. 2008. “Children's Cognitive-Behavioral Functioning at Age 6 and 7: Prenatal Drug Exposure and Caregiving Environment.” Ambulatory Pediatrics 8 (3): 154–62. Children's Cognitive-Behavioral Functioning at Age 6 and 7: Prenatal Drug Exposure and Caregiving Environment.
- Nair, Prasanna, Maureen E Schuler, Maureen M Black, Laurie Kettinger, and Donna Harrington. 2003. “Cumulative Environmental Risk in Substance Abusing Women: Early Intervention, Parenting Stress, Child Abuse Potential and Child Development.” Child Abuse & Neglect 27 (9): 997–1017. Cumulative environmental risk in substance abusing women: early intervention, parenting stress, child abuse potential and child development.

== Recognition ==
Nair has received multiple awards for her work in pediatric medicine. Some of these awards include a 1985 recognition of service award from the Maryland Department of Health and Mental Hygiene, a certificate of appreciation as a member of the National Institute of Drug Abuse in 1998, commendation of her service in 1985 from the Baltimore City Commission of Health, and induction into the Maryland Women's Hall of Fame in 2008. December 6 has been designated Prasanna Nair Day in Baltimore by Mayor Donald Schaefer.
