= Sandra Williams Ortega =

African American air force officer

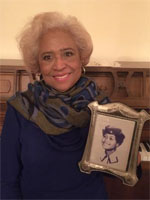
Sandra Williams Ortega

Sandra Williams Ortega was an officer in the U.S. Air Force for the state of Maryland. She is known as the first African American woman in the state to have an officer commission in the Air Force and was accepted into the Maryland Women's Hall of Fame in 2018. She was born in 1937 in Baltimore.
