= Bernice Smith White =

American activist and community leader (1924–2020)

- Born: February 27, 1924; Baltimore, Maryland, U.S.
- Died: October 24, 2020 (aged 96); Baltimore, Maryland, U.S.
- Occupations: Community worker Civic leader Activist

Bernice Smith White (February 27, 1924 – October 24, 2020) was an American community worker, civic leader, and a leader for equal rights for women. She was educated in Baltimore City Public Schools and received her bachelor's degree in education from Coppin State College (formerly known as Coppin Teacher's College). She also studied political science, government, personnel management, behavioral aspects of management, labor relations, and equal opportunity at Morgan State University, the Community College of Baltimore, George Washington University, the University of Maryland, and Fisk University. She taught in the Baltimore school system for about 12 years. In the Baltimore Urban League she worked as a volunteer in programs to provide job opportunities for youths.

White was the first Director of Community Education and Relations of the Baltimore City Community Relation Commission and interpreted the City's civil rights law for the public via radio, television, movies, print media, workshops, and conferences. She conducted a local radio program Radio WEBB. She also wrote a weekly column in the Baltimore Afro American called "It's Not A Man's World" from 1969 to 1974.

She was the first woman Insurance Compliance Specialist for the Social Security Administration, traveling across the country to monitor affirmative action programs of government Medicare contractors to ensure equality of opportunity for minorities and women. In July, 1969, she was appointed one of only three full-time National Directors of the Federal Women's Program which was established under Executive Order of the President. She served as a consultant for the former U.S. Civil Service Commission and lectured locally and nationally at conferences, workshops, and schools.

In October, 1972, she was promoted to the position of Community Relations Officer for the Social Security Administration and later named Chief of the Headquarters Coordination and Liaison Staff, Office of Governmental Affairs. This staff served as the primary source of advice and information regarding the public's position on SSA Entitlement Programs. She retired from the Social Security Administration in May 1984.

Through her affiliation with the organization Woman Power she worked with women to make them more politically aware and informed on current issues. She initiated the move to have sex included in the Provisions of Acts of Discrimination in the City Civil Rights Ordinance No. 103. The amendment was passed in August 1971 and signed into law by the Mayor. She was the first African-American chair of the Baltimore City Commission for Women.

White was appointed by former Governor Harry Hughes to serve on the Eastern Region Foster Care Review Board for Baltimore City. The Honorable Parris N. Glendening presented a Governor's Citation to her, acknowledging the Valued Hours Award she received from the Fullwood Foundation. She was inducted into the Maryland Women's Hall of Fame in 1999; she especially helped break barriers for women of color in the 1960s.

She died in Baltimore, Maryland in October 2020 at the age of 96.
