= Euphemia Mary Goldsborough Willson =

American nurse, spy (1866–1896)

Euphemia Mary Goldsborough Willson (June 5, 1836 – March 10, 1896) was an American nurse who aided wounded soldiers from both sides after the Civil War battles of Antietam, Maryland, and Gettysburg, Pennsylvania. She was also a spy for the Confederate Army and was banished to Richmond, Virginia, after her indictment. She stayed there for the remainder of the Civil War.

== Biography ==
Effie Goldsborough, or "Pheme" as she was also known, was born at her family's plantation, “Boston,” in Talbot County, Maryland, the first of eight children of Martin Goldsborough and Ann Hayward Goldsborough. Described as "bright, adventuresome, and quite creative," she was sent in the 1850s to a girl's boarding school in Tallahassee, Florida. By the beginning of the American Civil War, she had re-joined her family in Baltimore at 49 Courtland Street and although they were not slave owners, she "devoted her youth to the Southern cause." The family home would become a refuge for Confederate soldiers and blockade runners who would pick up and drop off illegal goods like mail and supplies to be sent past the Union troops.

At the Battle of Antietam in 1862, she joined several other women who traveled to the Maryland battlefront to nurse wounded soldiers even though nursing was considered a male occupation and the women risked infection and harassment. The effort proved to be enough of a success that she traveled to Point Lookout, the location of a Confederate prison in St. Mary's County, where she nursed soldiers. Again, at the Battle of Gettysburg, she nursed hundreds of wounded troops from both the North and South. She was assigned to care for wounded soldiers at a makeshift hospital in the building now named Gettysburg College.

Her self-described favorite patient was Confederate soldier Sam Watson, who she said was “One of the most attractive boys I ever saw." She had remained in Gettysburg for 9 weeks caring for the wounded but after Watson's death, she immediately moved back to Baltimore. As a spy for the Confederate Army, she was soon indicted for treason. She was banished from Maryland and sent to the Confederate capital of Richmond, Virginia, arriving on December 4, 1863.

According to the Maryland State Archives, after her indictment, "she was escorted South under heavy guard, taking with her only two trunks and $225 in federal money. Even as her life was in great jeopardy, tucked away in one of her trunks were important documents she was able to deliver to Richmond."

She received a positive reception in Virginia, where Confederate President Jefferson Davis ensured that she got a job with the Treasury. She soon returned to nursing and was outside the city when it was evacuated. Her father travelled from Baltimore to bring her home on July 2, 1865.

== Personal life ==
On June 29, 1874, in Cambridge, Maryland, at 38, she married Charles Perry Willson, a former Confederate soldier. The couple moved to Summit Point, West Virginia, where they played an important role in building the local church, by some estimates raising one-third of the funds needed. She died on March 10, 1896, at age 59 of cancer.

She was buried with her husband in Greenhill Cemetery in Berryville, Virginia.

== Accolades ==
She was the first Confederate woman elected into the Maryland Women's Hall of Fame.
