= Esther McCready =

American nurse and teacher (1931–2020)

- Born: January 10, 1931; Baltimore, Maryland, U.S.
- Died: September 2, 2020 (aged 89); Randallstown, Maryland, U.S.
- Known for: Nursing, Desegregation

Esther McCready (January 10, 1931 – September 2, 2020) was a nurse and teacher who desegregated the University of Maryland School of Nursing in 1950. The case was filed in 1949 in Baltimore City Court by National Association for the Advancement of Colored People lawyers Charles Hamilton Houston and Donald Gaines Murray (McCready v. Byrd, 1949). After the court sided with the university, the case went to the Maryland Court of Appeals, where it was argued by Houston, Murray, and Thurgood Marshall. The lower court's ruling was overturned by the Maryland Court of Appeals, and McCready began classes on September 5, 1950. She is in the Maryland Women's Hall of Fame.

After she graduated in 1953, McCready continued her career working for Druid Health Center, Morgan State University as head nurse, Cornell Medical Center in post-operative recovery, Harlem Hospital in the emergency room, and at New York University. Her career also included years as a general education teacher in public school in New York. In addition to nursing, McCready attended the Manhattan School of Music, where she earned a master's degree. She participated in traveling opera groups who toured around United States and Europe.

== Early life ==
Esther McCready was born in Baltimore, Maryland, and grew up in East Baltimore. Her parents, John and Elizabeth McCready, both were not involved in medicine or politics. She grew up with three other siblings in a loving household. She attended the segregated Dunbar High School in Baltimore, earning acclaim as an honor student. She also worked as a nurses' aide at Sinai Hospital. From a young age, Esther always knew she wanted to be in the nursing field from watching the way nurses worked during her visits to the hospital for routine check-ups.
