= June A. Willenz =

American military veterans advocate (1924–2020)

June Willenz
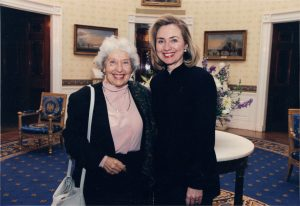
- Willenz with Hillary Clinton, c. 1990's
- Born: June Adele Friedenberg; December 17, 1924; Brooklyn, New York, U.S.
- Died: May 3, 2020 (aged 95); Bethesda, Maryland, U.S.
- Education: University of Michigan (BA, MPhil); The New School (ABD)
- Occupation: Veterans' rights activist
- Years active: 1945–2020
- Spouse: Eric Willenz (m. 1951–1968)
- Children: 2

June Adele Willenz (née Friedenberg; December 17, 1924 – May 3, 2020) was an American military veterans advocate, executive director of the American Veterans Committee (AVC), and author of Women Veterans: America's Forgotten Heroines (Continuum, 1983). Willenz also initiated the effort to build the Women in Military Service for America Memorial at Arlington National Cemetery. She was inducted into the Maryland Women's Hall of Fame in 2011.

== Early life and education ==
Willenz was born in Brooklyn on December 17, 1924, and grew up there. Her father, Benjamin Friedenberg, worked as a civil engineer and her mother, Sara Friedenberg (née Horowitz), was a housewife. After graduating from high school at the age of 16, she went on to study at Brooklyn College, before transferring to the University of Michigan. There, she earned first a bachelor's degree in chemistry in 1945, and then a master's degree in Philosophy two years later. She subsequently pursued doctoral studies in philosophy (ABD) at The New School for Social Research in New York. It was during her studies there that she first met Eric Willenz, a fellow student. They married in 1951, and had two daughters (Pam and Nicole). The couple later divorced in 1968.

== Career ==
Following graduation, Willenz worked at a variety of jobs before joining the AVC. She wrote a column for the Stars and Stripes newspaper, taught at Montgomery College in Takoma Park, Maryland, and directed the research program at the United States Department of Labor's Special Project on Employment of Women Veterans.

She became the executive director of the AVC in 1965, a position she held until the committee's dissolution in 2003. When she joined the AVC she was the first and only female head of a veteran's organization. After finding that many minority veterans had been discharged "less-than-honorably" for minor offenses, Willenz began campaigning to raise awareness of the inequities in the system. She developed the first legal aid project for veterans with discharge-related problems. As a result of her advocacy, thousands of Vietnam War veterans eventually had their discharges upgraded to "general" or "honorable" status.

Willenz was the first woman to head the Leadership Conference on Civil Rights Task Force on Military/Veterans Affairs, and the first to chair a Presidential Subcommittee on Disabled Veterans. She was cited for "outstanding leadership" of the Subcommittee. She organized a conference on the Draft, which encouraged national debate and influenced policy direction.

Willenz also advocated for the rights and recognition of women veterans. Her 1983 book, ''Women Veterans: America's Forgotten Heroines, documented the lives of several women who had served in the military and the impact it had on their lives. It also called attention to the inequality between men's and women's benefits, and the government's neglect of women veterans. Largely in response to the book, Congress held its first hearings on women veterans and the Veterans Administration established a Women Veterans Advisory Committee. Willenz also initiated efforts to create a national memorial to women veterans. Her work in the AVC eventually led to the building of the Women in Military Service for America Memorial.

For 22 years, Willenz chaired the World Veterans Federation's Committee on Women, which championed women's rights in peacetime as well as wartime. She represented the Federation at the United Nations, calling the attention of various U.N. agencies to the problems of women in armed conflict. She is credited with helping to increase women's influence in the international arena, as evidenced in United Nations Security Council resolutions "that now seek to include women in peacemaking and peacekeeping activities as well as post-conflict reconstruction strategies."

== Death ==
Willenz died on May 3, 2020, in Bethesda, Maryland. She was 95, and had suffered a heart attack after undergoing emergency hip surgery.
