= Liebe Sokol Diamond =

American pediatric orthopedic surgeon

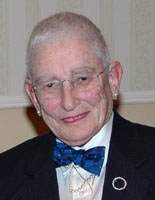
- Dr. Liebe Sokol Diamond from the Jewish Women's Archive
- Born: Liebe Sokol; January 10, 1931; Baltimore, Maryland
- Died: May 17, 2017 (aged 86); Pikesville, Maryland
- Education: Smith College; University of Pennsylvania
- Medical career
- Profession: Physician (retired)
- Field: Orthopedic surgery
- Institutions: Hospital of the University of Pennsylvania; University of Maryland
- Sub-specialties: Pediatric Hand Surgery
- Research: Pediatric Orthopedics (Reconstructive Surgery)

Liebe Sokol Diamond (January 10, 1931 – May 17, 2017) was an American pediatric orthopedic surgeon and an inductee of the Maryland Women's Hall of Fame.

== Biography ==
Diamond was born in 1931 at Sinai Hospital in Baltimore, Maryland, the only child of Max Sokol, a lawyer, and Anne Hirschhorn Sokol, a Hebrew Teacher. She was born with constriction ring syndrome, a congenital abnormality causing the loss of several of her fingers and toes before birth. She underwent more than 25 surgical procedures before reaching the age of 13. In addition to traditional surgical methods, she also visited “Emerson’s farm”, where young calves sucked on her fingers to soften the scars incurred by surgery.

Liebe Diamond's early life was shaped by many different cultural influences, one of which was the stream of European Jewish refugees who passed through her home as her parents helped as many Jews as possible flee Europe during the increasing crisis of the 1930s. Dr. Diamond recalled in an interview one occasion in which her father and a wealthy family friend forged a letter from their synagogue, thus risking criminal prosecution, to bring eight Jewish families into the United States. The interaction and exposure to so many different individuals shaped her literary, artistic, cultural and intellectual education.

Recognized for intellectual abilities, Diamond attended Baltimore City School #49, an accelerated junior high school. She then went on to Western High School, an all-girls school, and graduated in 1947 at the age of 16.

Showing a great aptitude for science, Diamond enrolled at Smith College when she was 16 years old and completed a bachelor's degree with a major in chemistry and a double minor in physics and zoology, graduating magna cum laude in 1951 with Phi Beta Kappa and Sigma Psi. She then attended the Perelman School of Medicine at the University of Pennsylvania; after graduating, she decided to pursue surgery and, with the encouragement of her own orthopedic surgeon, returned to the University of Pennsylvania to obtain a degree in orthopedics. After graduating in 1955, she became the first female resident at the Hospital of the University of Pennsylvania, and the hospital's first female orthopedic surgical resident in 1957. After completing her residency in 1960, she became a certified orthopedic surgeon in 1963. Diamond became the 14th woman to become certified by the American Board of Orthopaedic Surgery. She utilized custom-made gloves while performing surgeries, which allowed her to continue to operate for nearly 30 years, despite the lasting effects from her finger surgeries.

Working at the Hospital of the University of Pennsylvania, Diamond specialized in pediatric orthopedics, and in 1971, she founded the Pediatric Orthopedic Society of North America with seven other surgeons. From 1971 to 1972, she also served as the president of the Maryland Orthopedic Society. She later worked at the Curtis National Hand Center in Baltimore, specializing in children's hand and limb deformities; children with hand abnormalities were often brought to Diamond by their parents, not only for treatment but to illustrate how she had overcome her handicap. She was renowned for her innovative techniques for correcting limb deformities. She has worked as a consultant at Maryland General Hospital, Greater Baltimore Medical Center, Franklin Square Hospital and Union Memorial Hospital. She was also the director of residency training at University of Maryland Rehabilitation & Orthopaedic Institute from 1962 to the 1970s. She went on to run the Department of Clinical Research at Kernan Hospital for many years where she worked on reconstructive surgery and pediatric orthopedics research. Throughout her career, she authored numerous academic publications that continue to influence modern-day orthopedic surgical practice.

In 1968 she became the chairman of the board of the Baltimore Hebrew University, and served for several years. Diamond served as a clinical associate professor in orthopedic surgery and pediatrics at the University of Maryland for 35 years, from 1961 until 1996. She became the first President of the Ruth Jackson Society of Women Orthopedic Surgeons in 1983. In 1996, she was awarded a Smith College medal, for making the best use of a liberal arts education. She was inducted into the Maryland Women's Hall of Fame in 2006.

== Personal life ==
Diamond was raised in the Judaic faith. Near the end of her residency in 1959, she met Earl L. Diamond, a doctor working at the Johns Hopkins School of Public Health, marrying in the fall of 1960. She gave birth six years later to a son named Joshua Moses on July 16, 1966. She and her family were fans of the outdoors; they camped, hiked, paddled canoes, rode horses, skied cross country, among many other activities. In the summer, they were regular fixtures in Grand Teton National Park as well as Yellowstone National Park, where she was an authority on Great Fountain Geyser. She was also a fixture at the Everglades National Park in the winter. Enamored with the outdoors, she often drove long distances across the United States from her home in Maryland to various national and state parks.
