= Margaret Byrd Rawson =

American dyslexia expert, educator and psychologist (1899–2001)

- Born: June 30, 1899; Rome, Georgia
- Died: November 25, 2001 (aged 102); Frederick, Maryland
- Education: Swarthmore College; University of Pennsylvania
- Occupations: Teacher, researcher
- Employer: Hood College
- Known for: Dyslexia research
- Spouse: Arthur Joy Rawson
- Children: 2

Margaret Byrd Rawson (June 30, 1899 – November 25, 2001) was an American educator, researcher and writer. She was an early leader in the field of dyslexia, conducting one of the longest-running studies of language disorders ever undertaken and publishing nine books on dyslexia.

== Early life ==
Margaret Byrd Rawson was born on June 30, 1899, in Rome, Georgia. She grew up in Philadelphia, Pennsylvania and was raised a Quaker. When the Nineteenth Amendment to the United States Constitution passed, giving women the right to vote, Rawson was 21 and cast her first ballot for Socialiat Eugene V. Debs, then running for president from prison.

In 1923, she graduated Phi Beta Kappa from Swarthmore College. That year, she married Arthur Joy Rawson, an engineer with whom she had two sons, Kenneth and Edward. She later continued her education at the University of Pennsylvania, studying elementary education and psychology, particularly educational testing and measurements. She earned a master's degree in social work in 1940 and another in elementary education and psychology in 1946.

== Career ==
In 1929, Rawson and her husband were among a group of parents who established a new private school in Moylan, Pennsylvania (near Philadelphia), called the School in Rose Valley. She was a librarian, psychologist and teacher there until 1947, and through her work there became interested in dyslexia. While struggling to teach an otherwise-strong elementary school student to read in 1935, Rawson discovered Samuel T. Orton's pioneering neurological work on dyslexia. The child was sent for testing with Orton, and returned with both a diagnosis and instructions (later called the Orton-Gilligham method) on helping him through his difficulties learning to read. Following the prescribed method, the student was soon reading at grade level and Rawson had found her calling. She became a pioneering expert in dyslexia, eventually writing nine books, and quickly beginning one of the longest studies ever conducted of language disorders, following 56 boys from the School in Rose Valley for more than 50 years. At the time of her death, she was still in touch with many of them, by then in their 70s and most having had found professional success.

From 1947 to 1964, Rawson was assistant professor of sociology at Hood College in Frederick, Maryland, where she developed a seminar on the diagnosis and pedagogical strategies for dealing with dyslexia. From 1950 to 1957 she also worked as a psychologist for the Frederick County Health Department, and continued to tutor students as well.

Rawson cofounded and served as president of the Orton Dyslexia Society, which became the International Dyslexia Association, based in Towson, Maryland. She was the longtime editor of The Bulletin of the Orton Society (later called Annals of Dyslexia.) In 1973 she helped establish Baltimore's first for dyslexic children, the Jemicy School. She was President of the Council for Literacy and a member of the Presidents' Commission on Public Health in the 1970s. She was also a member of the Maryland Governor's Commission on Dyslexia.

Many of the field's foundational guidance is attributable to Rawson including, "Teach the language as it is to the child as he is" (rather than imposing methods without considering on the individual student), as well as the principle that teaching should be "rigorous, not rigid", and "structured, sequential, cumulative, thorough, and multisensory", more importantly than whether or not it hewed precisely to the Orton-Gillingham method.

== Awards and honors ==
Rawson was awarded honorary degrees from Swarthmore (1983) and from Hood College (1989).

In 2004, Rawson was inducted into the Maryland Women's Hall of Fame.

In 1998, she received an inaugural Lifetime Achievement award from the International Dyslexia Association (IDA), which thereafter awarded the prize in her name, the Margaret Byrd Rawson Lifetime Achievement award, for an IDA member who "embodies Margaret Rawson's compassion, leadership, commitment to excellence, fervent advocacy for people with dyslexia" and "nationally recognized" work.

The Margaret Byrd Rawson Institute for dyslexia learning, based in Frederick is also named for her, as is the Rawson-Saunders School in Austin, Texas.

== Later life ==
Rawson continued her work even as she neared 100 years old, continuing to speak at conferences and using technology to replace her failing eyesight.

Rawson died on 25 November 2001 in her home near in Frederick, Maryland. She was 102.

== Books ==
- A Bibliography on the Nature, Recognition and Treatment of Language Difficulties (1966)
- Prognosis in dyslexia (1966)
- Developmental Language Disability: Adult Accomplishments of Dyslexic Boys (1968)
- Perspectives of specific language disability. The past, what has been learned? (1971)
- The self concept and the cycle of growth (1974)
- Dyslexia and learning disabilities : their relationship (1978)
- Reading perception and language (1978)
- The Many Faces Of Dyslexia (1988)
- Dyslexia Over the Lifespan: A Fifty-Five-Year Longitudinal Study (1995)
