= Bea Gaddy =

American politician

- Born: Beatrice Frankie Fowler; February 20, 1933; Wake Forest, North Carolina, U.S.
- Died: October 3, 2001 (aged 68); Baltimore, Maryland, U.S.
- Known for: Social work, Community activism

Beatrice "Bea" Gaddy (February 20, 1933 – October 3, 2001) was a Baltimore city council member and a leading advocate for the poor and homeless. Known locally as the "Mother Teresa of Baltimore," she was inducted into the Maryland Women's Hall of Fame in 2006.

== Early life and education ==
Beatrice Frankie Fowler was born in Wake Forest, North Carolina, on February 20, 1933. She grew up in poverty, in a violent home. By the age of 25, she had been divorced twice and was the mother of five children, occasionally living on welfare. She and her children moved to New York City, where she worked for several years as a housekeeper.

In 1964, the family moved to Baltimore. While working and raising a family, Gaddy enrolled in mental health courses at Catonsville Community College. She went on to earn a bachelor's degree in human services from Antioch University in 1977.

== Career ==
Gaddy joined the staff of the East Baltimore Children's Fund in the early 1970s, offering the use of her home as a distribution center for food and clothing for the poor. In 1981 she founded the Patterson Park Emergency Food Center, personally collecting food donations from local churches in a shopping cart and distributing them to needy neighbors. That same year, she won $250 in the Maryland State Lottery and used it to serve about 40 of her neighbors a Thanksgiving Day dinner. Since then, the Bea Gaddy's Thanks for Giving Campaign has become an annual tradition in Baltimore, with hundreds of volunteers serving 3,000 meals on site and delivering 50,000 more to those who cannot travel.

Gaddy's food center also collected and distributed toys to children at Christmas, and hundreds of pairs of shoes each winter. In the 1990s she started a furniture bank and a program to renovate abandoned row houses for needy families. She became a minister so that she could perform marriages and burial ceremonies for the poor, free of charge. She was also involved in voter education and summer youth programs, and served as assistant chairperson in the Johns Hopkins Day Program. She was elected to the Baltimore City Council in 1999.

== Awards and honors ==
Gaddy received many awards and honors for her service to the community, including the Unsung Hero Award (1972), Afro American Woman of the Year (1984), Baltimore's Best Award (1984), the National Council of Negro Women Humanitarian Award (1988), Mayor's Citation (1988), and the Baltimore City Council Award (1987 and 1989). In 1992, President George H. W. Bush named Gaddy one of his "Thousand Points of Light," and The Baltimore Sun named her Marylander of the Year. She received an honorary Doctorate of Humane Letters from Towson State University in 1993, and the Frederick Douglass Award from the University System of Maryland Board of Regents in 2000.

== Death and legacy ==
Gaddy was diagnosed with breast cancer in 1998. She died on October 3, 2001, aged 68. Her work has been carried on by Bea Gaddy Family Centers, Inc. and by her daughter, Cynthia Brooks.
