= Sadie Kneller Miller =

American sports journalist (1867–1920)

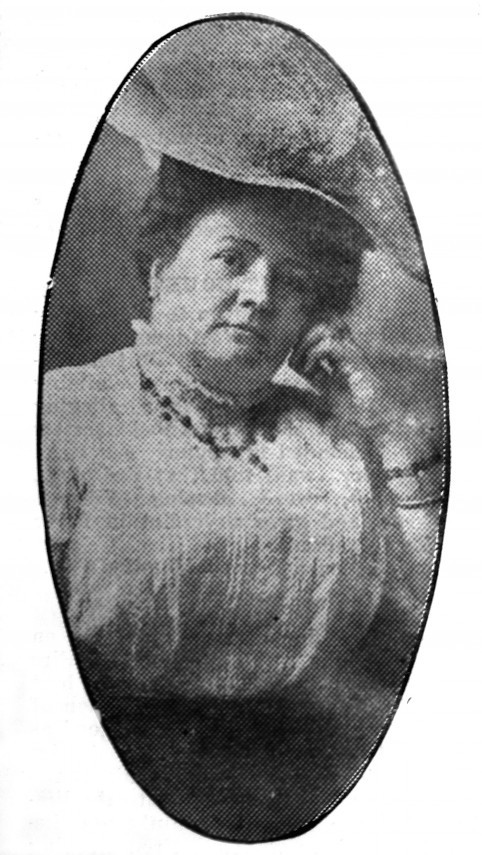
Sadie Kneller Miller, 1918

Sadie Kneller Miller (October 7, 1867 – November 21, 1920) was a Baltimore journalist, known for being one of the earliest female baseball reporters, as well as the only female correspondent covering some international events.

Miller was born in Westminster, Maryland. She graduated from Western Maryland College in 1885 and worked as a journalist for the Westminster Democratic Advocate. She then moved to Baltimore with her parents and started working for the Baltimore Telegram. At the Telegram she began covering the Baltimore Orioles in 1894 by disguising herself as a man; only after her female identity was found out was she known as the “only woman baseball reporter in the country”. She moved on to photography, submitting photos of Spanish–American War activities from the United States Naval Academy in Annapolis to Leslie’s Illustrated Weekly, securing her a position there. At Leslie’s, Miller covered stories such as the Baltimore Fire of 1904, the presidential inauguration of Howard Taft, and Democratic party conventions. She also photographed portraits of Susan B. Anthony and Teddy Roosevelt.

Miller was a professional journalist, but most people did not know she was a woman. She wrote with the byline "SKM", which hid her female identity. She may have been the first woman to cover major league baseball and is one of the few to combine photography with journalism. While on national tour with the Orioles in 1897, her gender was "discovered".

She became the world's first female war correspondent while covering the fighting in Morocco between Spanish forces and the Moors in 1909.

While working on an assignment in Germany, she was arrested as a spy. She also wrote on the Yukon Gold Rush and did interviews from several countries including Cuba, Czarist Russia, and Turkey. Her most reprinted interview was with Pancho Villa, a Mexican Revolutionary general in 1916 at his guerrilla base.

A stroke in 1918 forced Miller to retire from Leslie's Illustrated Weekly, ending her career as a journalist. She died two years later. Her name was added to the Maryland Women's Hall of Fame in 1988.
