= Dorothy F. Bailey =

American politician

- Born: Dunn, North Carolina, U.S.
- Education: North Carolina Central University
- Known for: Activist; Politician

Dorothy F. Bailey is an American civic leader from Prince George's County, Maryland. She served on the county council for eight years, serving two terms as chairman. She has served on the boards of many national and local organizations, including the National Council of Negro Women and the Association for the Study of African American Life and History (ASALH). She established the county's Harlem Renaissance Festival, which has been held annually since 1999, and founded several community organizations. She was inducted into the Maryland Women's Hall of Fame in 2014.

== Biography ==
She was born in Dunn, North Carolina. She first became involved in civil rights advocacy while studying sociology at North Carolina Central University, from which she received a B.A. degree in 1962. She pursued postgraduate studies in education and gerontology at Pennsylvania State University and the University of Maryland. Early in her career she taught in the public schools and worked in the University of Maryland's Upward Bound program.

From 1983 to 1994, she held senior-level positions at several Prince George's County government agencies, including executive director of the Consumer Protection Commission, and community partnerships director at the Department of Family Services. In 1994 she was elected to the Prince George's county council, where she served for eight years. She was council chairman for two terms and vice chair for three terms. After leaving the council, Bailey served as parent liaison for the Prince George's County Public Schools.

In 2001, Bailey was elected to the national executive council of the Association for the Study of African American Life and History (ASALH); she is also president of the Prince George's County chapter. In 2002 she founded the Harlem Remembrance Foundation of Prince George's County, serving as its chairman of the board from 2003 to 2011. The foundation holds the annual Harlem Renaissance Festival, an idea Bailey conceived as a way to highlight the artistic and cultural contributions of African Americans during the Harlem Renaissance era, and to showcase the work of county residents who continue that legacy. The festival draws thousands of visitors each year and features poetry readings, dance performances, visual art, and live jazz. Notable performers have included actor Clifton Powell, who read the poetry of Langston Hughes, and jazz vocalist Jean Carne.

Bailey was instrumental in the founding of several other non-profit organizations, including the LEARN Foundation (Landover Educational Athletic Recreational Non-Profit), the Kiamsha Youth Empowerment Organization, and the Royal Bafokeng Sister City Friendship Committee. She has also served on the national and local boards of the National Council of Negro Women.

== Honors and awards ==
- Induction into the Maryland Women's Hall of Fame, 2014
- Gladys Noon Spellman Award for Public Service
- NAACP Image Award for Political Activism, 1999
- The National Council of Negro Women's Bethune Recognition Award
- North Carolina Central University's 2013 Alumnus of the Year
- Induction into the Prince George's County Women's Hall of Fame, 1996
- Honorary Doctorate of Divinity from Riverside Baptist College and Seminary, 1991

== Publications ==
- Bailey, Dorothy F. (2011). In a Different Light: Reflections and Beauty of Wise Women of Color. coProductions LLC. ISBN 9780615455341.
