= Virginia Walcott Beauchamp =

American educator and writer (1920-2019)

- Born: Virginia Mary Walcott; June 28, 1920; Sparta, Michigan
- Died: February 10, 2019 (aged 98); Harwood, Maryland
- Occupation(s): Educator and writer

Virginia Walcott Beauchamp (June 28, 1920 – February 10, 2019) was an American educator and writer who was the founding coordinator of the Women's studies program at the University of Maryland, College Park.

Walcott was born in Sparta, Michigan, the daughter of two teachers. She earned a B.A. in English at the University of Michigan in 1942, and after serving with the Red Cross during World War II, she returned to Michigan to complete an M.A. in 1948. She received a Ph.D. in English from the University of Chicago in 1955.

Beauchamp moved to Greenbelt, Maryland, in 1957, and soon joined the staff of the Greenbelt News Review, where she would serve as a reporter, editor, editorial writer and a member of the Board of Directors over several decades.

During a two-year stint in Lagos, Nigeria, she helped found the American International School of Lagos in 1964.

Beauchamp joined the University of Maryland faculty in the 1965 and helped to found the women's studies program, serving as its first coordinator when it was inaugurated in 1973. At the University, she helped start the Chancellor's Commission on Women's Affairs in 1971, which became the President's Commission on Women's Affairs, which she chaired from 1987 to 1990. When she retired in 1990, Beauchamp was honored with the Outstanding Faculty Woman on Campus award.

In 1976, Beauchamp was a founding member of the Women’s Action Coalition of Prince George's County. She also served on the Prince George’s County Commission on Women from 1990 to 1993. Beauchamp was named to the Prince George’s County Women’s Hall of Fame in 1991 and she was inducted into the Maryland Women's Hall of Fame in 2003.

Beauchamp died on February 10, 2019, at a hospice center in Harwood, Maryland, of cerebrovascular disease.

== Publications ==
Beauchamp, Virginia Walcott (May 1, 1987). A private war : letters and diaries of Madge Preston, 1862-1867. Rutgers University Press. ISBN 0813512069.
