= Joanne Katz =

Epidemiologist and biostatistician

- Born: Cape Town, South Africa
- Education: University of Cape Town (BS); Princeton University (MS); Johns Hopkins Bloomberg School of Public Health (ScD)
- Occupations: Educator; biostatistician; epidemiologist
- Scientific career
- Workplaces: Wilmer Eye Institute (1982–1994); Johns Hopkins Bloomberg School of Public Health (1994-present)
- Thesis: Village and household clustering of morbidity and mortality in developing countries (1992)

Joanne Katz is an epidemiologist, biostatistician, and Professor of International Health at the Johns Hopkins Bloomberg School of Public Health. She holds joint appointments in the Departments of Biostatistics, Epidemiology and Ophthalmology within the School of Medicine. Her expertise is in maternal, neonatal, and child health. She has contributed to the design, conduct and analysis of data from large community-based intervention trials on nutritional and other interventions in Indonesia, Philippines, Bangladesh, Nepal, and other countries.

== Early life and education ==
Joanne Katz was born in Cape Town, South Africa. Her father, Robert Katz, was a builder of large apartment buildings across Cape Town and a holder of several patents in Africa and Europe. Her mother, Ray Katz, a lawyer, was one of the first women admitted to the South African bar. Katz was the second of four children. The family immigrated to the United States in 1978, just after Katz graduated with a Bachelor of Science in economics and statistics from the University of Cape Town.

She received a Master of Science in mathematical statistics from Princeton University in 1982 and immediately joined the faculty of the newly established Dana Center in the Johns Hopkins Department of Ophthalmology as a research associate. While working full time, Dr Katz earned a Doctor of Science in international health from the Johns Hopkins Bloomberg School of Public Health in 1993. Her dissertation was titled Village and household clustering of morbidity and mortality in developing countries.

== Career ==
From 1982 to 1994, Katz served on the faculty of the Dana Center for Preventive Ophthalmology in the Wilmer Eye Institute at Johns Hopkins. With an MS degree, she was promoted to assistant professor in 1986 and to associate professor in 1991. In 1994, she moved with several colleagues into the Johns Hopkins Bloomberg School of Public Health Department of International Health. There, she was promoted to professor in 1997.

=== Research ===
Katz has contributed to the research and the diagnosis of eye disease, specifically to underserved children and elderly in Baltimore.

Her research has also sought to find low cost interventions to reduce micronutrient deficiencies, infectious diseases, and poor reproductive outcomes among pregnant women, adolescents, and young children in Africa and Asia. Starting in 1982, as a statistician, she worked with Alfred Sommer to analyze data to uncover a link between vitamin A deficiency (VAD) and an increased risk for child mortality.

From 1983 to 1992, Katz worked with Keith West and James Tielsch to run a number of large scale, community-based, randomized trials to identify a link between VAD and child mortality. Their work showed they could reduce child mortality in at-risk populations by 23 to 34%. They conducted a number of randomized trials in Indonesia and Nepal in the 1980s. By 1992, the World Health Organization, UNICEF, the United Nations's Food and Agriculture Organization, and the Convention on the Rights of the Child declared the control of VAD as a common goal.

Katz has been working in Nepal since 1988, with the Nepal Nutrition Intervention Project Sarlahi (NNIPS). This is the site of multiple observational studies and randomized community trials that showed preschool vitamin A supplementation improved child survival, maternal vitamin A supplementation improved maternal survival, maternal multiple micronutrient supplementation improved birth and survival outcomes, and chlorhexidine for umbilical cord care improved neonatal survival. Vitamin A supplementation and chlohexidine for cord care are now national programs in Nepal and other countries. Nepal was also the site of trials to assess the health impacts of preschool child zinc and iron supplementation, improved cookstoves to reduce indoor air pollution, a maternal influenza vaccine trial to improve birth weight and reduce infant influenza infection, a randomized trial of neonatal oil massage with either mustard or sunflower seed oil to improve neonatal survival, and an ongoing trial of a balanced energy protein and micronutrient supplement for pregnant and lactating women to improve birth outcomes and infant growth.

Katz’s research also includes analyses of data sets from multiple low- and middle-income countries to estimate the burden of different small vulnerable newborn types.

== Awards ==
- 2011, 2005, 2002 Advising, Mentoring and Teaching Recognition Award, Johns Hopkins Bloomberg School of Public Health
- 2011 Johns Hopkins Alumni Knowledge for the World Award
- 2011 Global Health Excellence in Advising Award, Johns Hopkins University
- 2016 Maryland Women's Hall of Fame inductee
- 2018 Ernest Lyman Stebbins Medal for extraordinary contributions to the educational programs of the Johns Hopkins Bloomberg School of Public Health
- 2019, 2011 Golden Apple Teaching Award, Johns Hopkins Bloomberg School of Public Health
- 2023 Dean's Award for Distinction in Faculty Mentoring for sustained commitment to excellence in fostering the scientific, academic and/or career development of fellow faculty members, Johns Hopkins Bloomberg School of Public Health

== Select publications ==
- Black, Robert E; Victora, Cesar G; Walker, Susan P; Bhutta, Zulfiqar A; Christian, Parul; de Onis, Mercedes; Ezzati, Majid; Grantham-McGregor, Sally; Katz, Joanne; Martorell, Reynaldo; Uauy, Ricardo (August 3, 2013). "Maternal and child undernutrition and overweight in low-income and middle-income countries". The Lancet. 382 (9890): 427–451. doi:10.1016/S0140-6736(13)60937-X. PMID 23746772. S2CID 12237910.
- Abarca-Gómez, Leandra; Abdeen, Ziad A; Hamid, Zargar Abdul; et al. (December 16, 2017). "Worldwide trends in body-mass index, underweight, overweight, and obesity from 1975 to 2016: a pooled analysis of 2416 population-based measurement studies in 128·9 million children, adolescents, and adults". The Lancet. 390 (10113): 2627–2642. doi:10.1016/S0140-6736(17)32129-3. PMC 5735219. PMID 29029897.
- NCD Risk Factor Collaboration (NCD-RisC) (April 2016). "Trends in adult body-mass index in 200 countries from 1975 to 2014: a pooled analysis of 1698 population-based measurement studies with 19·2 million participants". The Lancet. 387 (10026): 1377–1396. doi:10.1016/S0140-6736(16)30054-X. hdl:10230/28358. PMC 7615134. PMID 27115820. S2CID 13764533.
- Perchetti, Garrett A; Wilcox, Naomi; Chu, Helen Y; Katz, Joanne; Khatry, Subarna K; LeClerq, Steven C; Tielsch, James M; Jerome, Keith R; Englund, Janet A; Kuypers, Jane (April 30, 2021). "Human Metapneumovirus Infection and Genotyping of Infants in Rural Nepal". Journal of the Pediatric Infectious Diseases Society. 10 (4): 408–416. doi:10.1093/jpids/piaa118. PMID 33137178.
- Bryce, Emily; Katz, Joanne; Munos, Melinda K; Lama, Tsering; Khatry, Subarna; LeClerq, Steve (June 7, 2021). "Validation of Maternal Recall of Iron Folic Supplementation During Antenatal Care in Rural Southern Nepal". Current Developments in Nutrition. 5 (Supplement_2): 722. doi:10.1093/cdn/nzab046_019. PMC 8181940.
- Sommer, Alfred; Tielsch, James M.; Katz, Joanne; Quigley, Harry A.; Gottsch, John D.; Javitt, Jonathan C.; Martone, James F.; Royall, Richard M.; Witt, Kathe A.; Ezrine, Sandi (November 14, 1991). "Racial Differences in the Cause-Specific Prevalence of Blindness in East Baltimore". New England Journal of Medicine. 325 (20): 1412–1417. doi:10.1056/NEJM199111143252004. PMID 1922252.
