= Leslie R. Wolfe =

American women's rights leader

Leslie Rosenberg Wolfe
- Born: November 24, 1943; Washington, D.C.
- Died: November 30, 2017 (aged 74); Rockville, Maryland
- Education: University of Florida (Ph.D. in English literature)
- Occupation: Women's rights activist
- Known for: Leadership of the Center for Women Policy Studies; advocate for women of color
- Spouse(s): Barry Wolfe (divorced), William Greene (deceased)

Leslie Rosenberg Wolfe (November 24, 1943 – November 30, 2017) was an American women's rights activist, known for her work as the longtime leader of the Center for Women Policy Studies. She particularly focused her activism on the intersection of racism and sexism faced by women of color.

== Early life and education ==
Leslie Rosenberg was born in 1943 in Washington, D.C., and grew up in the nearby suburb of Bethesda, Maryland.

She attended the University of Illinois, graduating in 1965, then obtained a master's degree from the University of Maryland, College Park, in 1967. She subsequently studied at the University of Florida, where she graduated with a Ph.D. in English literature in 1970.

== Career ==
Wolfe worked briefly as an English professor at Olivet College, but during the years of second-wave feminism she became actively involved in women's rights activism, which became her long-term career.

In the 1970s, she worked at the National Welfare Rights Organization, the United States Commission on Civil Rights' Women's Rights Program, and the Department of Health, Education, and Welfare. Her experiences there led to her particular interest in advocating for women of color, especially those facing other intersecting obstacles such as poverty or disability. Then, she was hired to lead the federal Women's Educational Equity Act program, which worked to implement Title IX, in 1979. She brought her intersectional lens to the bureau, later saying, "By then this was my whole life—building a multi-ethnic feminist movement step by step anywhere you can."

In 1983, Wolfe was fired from government service, ostensibly in a "reduction of force," but she believed her dismissal was politically motivated. She had long sparred with her supervisors in the Reagan administration, at one point refusing to remove a poster of Che Guevara from the wall in her office. The year before, an anonymous article in the magazine Conservative Digest had described her program as "a network of openly radical feminists," and four of Wolfe's co-workers were fired at the same time as she was.

On leaving the government, she was hired as director of the NOW Legal Defense and Education Fund's Project on Equal Education Rights. Then, in 1987, she became president of the Center for Women Policy Studies in Washington, D.C. She led the organization until it closed in 2015.

Wolfe was an early advocate for women affected by the HIV/AIDS crisis, and in 1989 she co-authored an influential report on how the SAT discriminated against female and non-white students. In addition to her influential efforts on HIV/AIDs and college admission exams, her work at the policy organization included projects on diversity in the workplace, reproductive rights, and violence against women. Wolfe fought against the euphemistic couching of "sexism" and "racism" as "gender" or "discrimination", saying "I resist the softer terms like 'diversity,' which is almost meaningless in the context of ending oppression."

In 2020, she was inducted into the Maryland Women's Hall of Fame.

== Personal life ==
Her marriage to her first husband, Barry Wolfe, ended in divorce. Wolfe remarried, wedding William Greene, who died in 1998.

She continued to live throughout her adult life in Montgomery County, Maryland, where she was involved in educational equity efforts. She died in 2017 in Rockville, Maryland.
