= Bessie Moses =

American gynecologist and obstetrician

- Born: 1893; Baltimore, Maryland, United States
- Died: 1965 (aged 71–72); Baltimore, Maryland, USA
- Education: Goucher College (BA)
- Occupations: Gynecologist, obstetrician, birth control advocate

Bessie Louise Moses (1893–1965) was a U.S. gynecologist and obstetrician who advocated birth control practices for women.

== Life ==
=== Early life ===
Born in Baltimore, Maryland to a prominent German-Jewish family, Moses graduated from Goucher College in 1915 and began her public career after graduating from Johns Hopkins Medical School in 1922.

=== Early career ===
Moses began private practice as an obstetrician, but this path proved ill-suited when she became emotionally attached to the outcome of every birth she attended, so she instead chose to pursue gynecology.

=== Baltimore Birth Control Clinic ===
From the inception of the Baltimore Bureau for Contraceptive Advice in 1927, through to her retirement in 1956, Moses was the medical director for these community resources. Moses fought to expand contraceptive services to additional communities and lobbied for inclusion of contraceptive instruction in medical school curricula.

The Baltimore Bureau for Contraceptive Advice was incorporated in 1926, opened its doors to patients in 1927, and operated until 1932. The Bureau originally was set up as a public health research venture with strict rules about referral of patients for its services. In order to avoid controversy and prosecution, the women who were referred to the clinic for participation in the study had to be married and their health in such a deteriorated state that further pregnancies could prove fatal. As the social stigma and legal proscription of disseminating contraceptive information and devices eased during the Great Depression, the Bureau became the Baltimore Birth Control Clinic, which eventually became part of the Planned Parenthood Federation of America.

=== As a campaigner ===
She was integral in the fight for legislative reform of the prohibition of sending contraceptive information and materials through the mail.

== Legacy ==
As a result of her contributions to legitimizing birth control through the avenue of public health, Moses was honored with the Lasker Foundation Award in 1950, which she received along with Margaret Sanger. In 1991, she was posthumously added to the Maryland Women's Hall of Fame.

== Bibliography ==
- Klapper, Melissa R. “Bessie Louise Moses: 1893–1965,” Jewish Women's Archive, http://ga.jwa.org/encyclopedia/article/moses-bessie-louise%5B%5D (accessed November 24, 2009).
- Maryland State Archives. “Maryland Women’s Hall of Fame: Bessie Moses, M.D. (1893–1965),” Maryland State Archives, 2001. (At Internet Archive).
- Morton, Lauren P. “Baltimore’s First Birth Control Clinic: The Bureau for Contraceptive Advice, 1927-1932.” Maryland Historical Magazine 102, no. 4 (2007): 300–319.
- Moses, Bessie L. Contraception as a Therapeutic Measure. Baltimore: Williams & Wilkins, 1936.
- U.S. Congress. Senate. Subcommittee of the Committee on the Judiciary. Birth Control: Confidential Hearing before the Subcommittee of the Committee on the Judiciary. 72nd Cong., 1st sess., June 24 and 30, 1932. http://www.lexisnexis.com/congcomp/getdoc?HEARING-ID=HRG-1932-SJS-0020 (accessed October 23, 2009).
