= Ramona McCarthy Hawkins =

African-American pharmacist from Maryland

- Born: July 31, 1928; Columbus, Ohio
- Died: February 15, 2018 (aged 89)
- Education: Ohio State University
- Occupations: Pharmacist and chemist
- Employer(s): National Institutes of Health; Food and Drug Administration
- Organization: Blacks in Government
- Children: 3
- Honours: Maryland Women's Hall of Fame

Ramona McCarthy Hawkins (July 31, 1928 – February 15, 2018) was a pioneering African-American pharmacist and research chemist from Maryland. In recognition of her work in pharmacy and for breaking barriers for African-American women in the pharmaceutical sciences, she was named to the Maryland Women's Hall of Fame in 2008.

== Biography ==
=== Early life and education ===
Ramona McCarthy Hawkins was born in Columbus, Ohio on July 31, 1928. She was the daughter of James Osborne and Ethel Foree Smith. She grew up as the fourth of five children. She went on to college at Ohio State University. She graduated with a Bachelor of Science in Pharmacy, becoming one of the few African-American women practicing pharmacy at the time, as the discipline was dominated by men. She later pursued a fellowship in bio-chemistry at Ohio State, where she continued her academic work.

=== Federal career ===
In 1954, McCarthy Hawkins moved to Maryland and took a position with the National Institutes of Health. She would then go on to work as a review chemist at the Food and Drug Administration. While a federal employee, she advocated against racism in the federal government. In 1975, she became a founding member of Blacks in Government (BIG), later serving as BIG's first president.

While a federal employee, McCarthy Hawkins made a number of notable firsts. In 1963, she became one of the first African American female pharmacists to serve in the Food and Drug Administration's (FDA) new drug application (NDA) division. In 1966, McCarthy Hawkins became the first African American female pharmacist to serve as a patent examiner on pharmaceuticals at the United States Patent and Trademark Office.

In 1996 after thirty one years of service at the FDA, McCarthy Hawkins retired from the federal government.

=== Later career and legacy ===
After McCarthy Hawkins retired, Governor Parris Glendening appointed her as a board commissioner to the Maryland State Board of Pharmacy. She served two terms on the board, helping to set standards in pharmacy practice. In 2007, she was awarded the Chauncey I. Cooper Award by the National Pharmaceutical Association for her work advocating for minorities within the profession. In 2008, she was recognized by the Maryland Women's Hall of Fame for her work as a pharmacist and to the people of Maryland.

McCarthy Hawkins died on February 15, 2018.
