= Emily Wilson Walker =

American doctor (1904–2007)

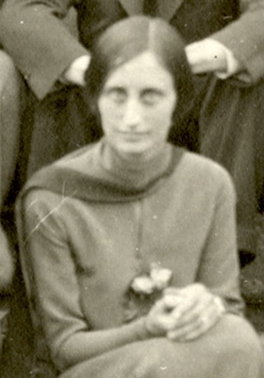
- Born: Emily Cumming Hammond; July 8, 1904; Beech Island, South Carolina
- Died: July 10, 2007 (aged 103); Annapolis, Maryland
- Citizenship: United States
- Education: Goucher College; University of Georgia; Medical College of Georgia
- Occupation: Physician
- Years active: 1927-1982
- Spouse(s): John Fletcher Wilson (1932-1952); Albert Tupper Walker (1974-1988)
- Children: 2
- Relatives: James Henry Hammond (great-grandfather)
- Awards: Maryland Women's Hall of Fame

Emily Hammond Wilson Walker (July 8, 1904 – July 10, 2007) was an American physician. Only the second woman to graduate from her medical school, the Medical College of Georgia, she was initially refused a position at Anne Arundel Hospital but went on to become its chief of staff. A career country doctor of more than 50 years, she set up early sexual health and prenatal clinics and diagnosed the first case of Rocky Mountain spotted fever in Maryland. She was known for her willingness to treat all patients regardless of means, as well as her resistance to Jim Crow laws, welcoming African American patients into her waiting room alongside white ones.

== Early life and education ==
Emily Cumming Hammond was born on July 8, 1904, on Redcliffe Plantation, in Beech Island, South Carolina, to Mary Gwyn Hammond and Christopher Cashiel Fitzsimmons Hammond. She was the eldest of eight, born into a formerly upper-class family that was impoverished by the time of her birth. Her great-grandfather was James Henry Hammond, who had served as Governor and US Senator from South Carolina before the Civil War.

Emily Hammond became interested in medicine as a child, assisting her mother's charity work with African American families who often cared for their sick children as they were often unable to access medical care in the Jim Crow South. By 13, Emily Hammond earned the nickname "Doc" and began to pursue a dream of becoming a real doctor.

Hammond attended St. Genevieve's in Asheville, North Carolina, then Goucher College in Baltimore, Maryland. She did not care for city life, so after graduating, she went to Athens, Georgia, to do premedical studies at the University of Georgia. For medical school, she enrolled at the Medical College of Georgia in 1927, graduating as the only woman in her class and the second woman ever. She conducted her medical internship at the Central of Georgia Railroad Hospital in Savannah.

== Medical career and marriage in Maryland ==
Following her internship, Hammond moved back to Baltimore for a job in medical research at Johns Hopkins Hospital but took a leave in 1929 to start a country practice in rural Friendship, Maryland. Locals were disappointed to see a young woman arrive instead of a male doctor, and her first patient was a dog in need of stitches. But she gamely treated the dog, which survived, and she won over the community's confidence.

She began her practice out of the only room that would rent to her, closing off her living quarters with a screen, but most of her practice was initially house calls. The rural community had only two paved roads at the time, and Wilson had to travel by borrowed horse rather than car in mud or snow seasons. Jim Crow segregation prevailed in the area, but Wilson resisted, seating African American patients in her waiting room alongside white ones and taking them in order of arrival or urgency rather than seeing white patients first. She also delivered babies for African American women, as the hospital in Annapolis refused to care for them. She charged $1 for an office visit or $15 for delivery of a baby, often accepting payment in the form of bushels of oysters, dozens of eggs farm produce, or day labor on her farms, planting tobacco and raising cattle.

In 1932, Hammond married John Fletcher Wilson, moved her office to their farm in Lothian, and thereafter went by Dr. Wilson. They had two sons, born in 1934 (John Junior) and 1936 (Christopher), and in 1947, the family purchased the historic Obligation Farm in Harwood, which dates to the late 1600s. John Wilson died in 1952.

Anne Arundel Hospital initially refused to take her on staff, but by 1951, she was chief of staff and later served as president of the Anne Arundel Medical Society. She diagnosed the first case of Rocky Mountain spotted fever in Maryland in the late 1940s and established syphilis and prenatal clinics for the rural county. Her role in the county had particularly increased in importance during World War II when the large numbers of men deployed left her as one of the only doctors practicing in the area. By this time, more patients had cars, and she began keeping office hours, able to see many more patients in the time a single house call used to require. She also functioned as a pharmacist, as the small town had no drugstore.

== Later life and legacy ==
Emily Wilson remarried in 1974 to Albert Tupper Walker, whom she had dated as a teenager. Wilson continued as Dr. Wilson professionally through her retirement in 1982. Albert Walker died in 1988. Emily Wilson Walker lived at Obligation Farm until 2005 when she moved to Genesis Elder Care Spa Creek Center in Annapolis. Walker died there on July 10, 2007, of cardiac arrhythmia. She was 103.

Walker is the subject of a 1996 biography called Doc: The Life of Emily Hammond Wilson, by Therese Magnotti, former president of the Shady Side Rural Heritage Society.

In 2008, Walker was posthumously inducted into the Maryland Women's Hall of Fame.
