= Mary Elizabeth Banning =

American mycologist (1822–1903)

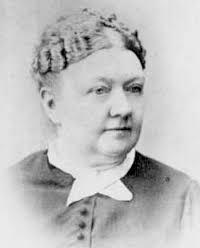
- Born: 6 April 1822; Talbot County, Maryland, U.S.
- Died: 28 February 1903 (aged 80); Winchester, Virginia, U.S.
- Scientific career
- Fields: Mycology

Mary Elizabeth Banning (6 April 1822 – 28 February 1903) was an American mycologist (fungi biologist) and botanical illustrator from Maryland. She formally described 23 previously unknown species of fungi, publishing their type descriptions in the Botanical Gazette and Charles Peck's "Annual Report of the New York State Botanist". She was the first woman outside of Europe to name a fungal taxon.

== Early life and education ==
Banning was born in 1822 in Talbot County on Maryland's eastern shore. She was the daughter of Robert Banning and Mary Macky, and was the youngest of her father's eight children (six from a previous marriage). The Bannings were a well-established Maryland family: Mary Elizabeth's grandfather was a representative at Maryland's ratification of the federal constitution, and her father was a military captain, Collector of the Port of Oxford, and Member of the Maryland House of Delegates.

In 1845, when Banning was 23, her father died. In 1855, Banning, her mother, and her sisters moved to Baltimore. By 1860, her mother and sister Catherine had become chronically ill, and Banning became their caretaker. Throughout this period she maintained an interest in natural history, finally gravitating to the study of fungi. With her own money, she bought a microscope and started to amass a scientific library and private herbarium. She also initiated a correspondence with Charles Horton Peck, a New York State Museum scientist who, by then, was well on his way to becoming "the dean of American mycologists". They corresponded for over 30 years; in 1879 Banning wrote to him that “you are my only friend in the debatable land of fungi and your kind instruction is valued above all measure”.

== Career ==
Mary Banning is best known as the author of The Fungi of Maryland, an unpublished manuscript containing scientific descriptions, mycological anecdotes, and 174 watercolor paintings of fungal species, measuring 13 by 15 inches each. The New York State Museum describes these paintings as "extraordinary...a blend of science and folk art, scientifically accurate and lovely to look at". Banning's manuscript took twenty years to complete (1868–1888). Although the Maryland State Archives citing Stegman asserts that "At this point in time, no one had written a book on American fungi" and Haines states "In 1868 there were no books from which to learn about American fungi", neither assertion is technically correct: Schweinitz's Synopsis Fungorum Carolinæ Superioris was published in 1822. Nevertheless, had Banning's opus been published, it would certainly have been the first illustrated and popularly accessible fungal flora of the southern United States. Banning wrote that “Fungi are considered vegetable outcasts. Like beggars by the wayside dressed in gay attire, they ask for attention but claim none".

She was inducted into the Maryland Women's Hall of Fame in 1994.

== Challenges as a female mycologist ==
Banning eventually became the "leading mycologist in her region". Despite this, she was a woman, and she had no formal higher education. Consequently, with the exception of her mentor Peck, she found herself largely ostracized by the educated male scientific establishment of the day. Her private letters reveal her deep dissatisfaction with this state of affairs. Unable to obtain funding and having to care for her invalid mother and sister, Banning "incurred increasing financial problems".

Conversely, her mycological pursuits led to several awkward encounters with fungus-fearing locals, many of which she recounts as asides in her scientific publications. In 1876, she rode six miles in a crowded "public conveyance" holding a basket of Phallus duplicatus — a particularly foul-smelling fungus with the common name "netted stinkhorn." By the end of the ride, Banning states that "the smell had increased to such an extent that the flies nearly devoured me, in their eagerness to get at the fungus". The other passengers maintained a stony silence for the duration of the trip. On another occasion, a man approached her, asking if she had found any "frog stools" that day. When she replied that she had not, he answered, "And it's a blessed thing you can't find 'em!...Pison [sic] things...Better let frog stools alone! That's my advice to everyone." The man then walked away, muttering about Banning: "Poor thing. Crazy, certain sure. Clean gone mad!". On yet another occasion, Banning had employed three young boys to collect mushrooms. When they brought their finds to the hotel where she was staying and asked where they might find the 'frog stool lady,' the waiter replied, "Off with you! Have you gone crazy? Who ever heard tell of a frog-stool lady?".

In the preface to her unpublished manuscript, Banning discusses the origin of her project in terms recalling then-prevalent natural theology:

"My first idea of drawing and painting the Fungi of Maryland had for its object educational training in a mission school.... I confess to a smile at my choice of a subject, feeling that for once I had stepped from the sublime to the ridiculous. :::Yet I feel satisfied with my undertaking, believing that the study of Natural Science in any of its departments has a refining influence—that when used in its truest highest sense it is the Divinely appointed means of teaching faith as well as cultivating the minds and morals."

== Final years ==
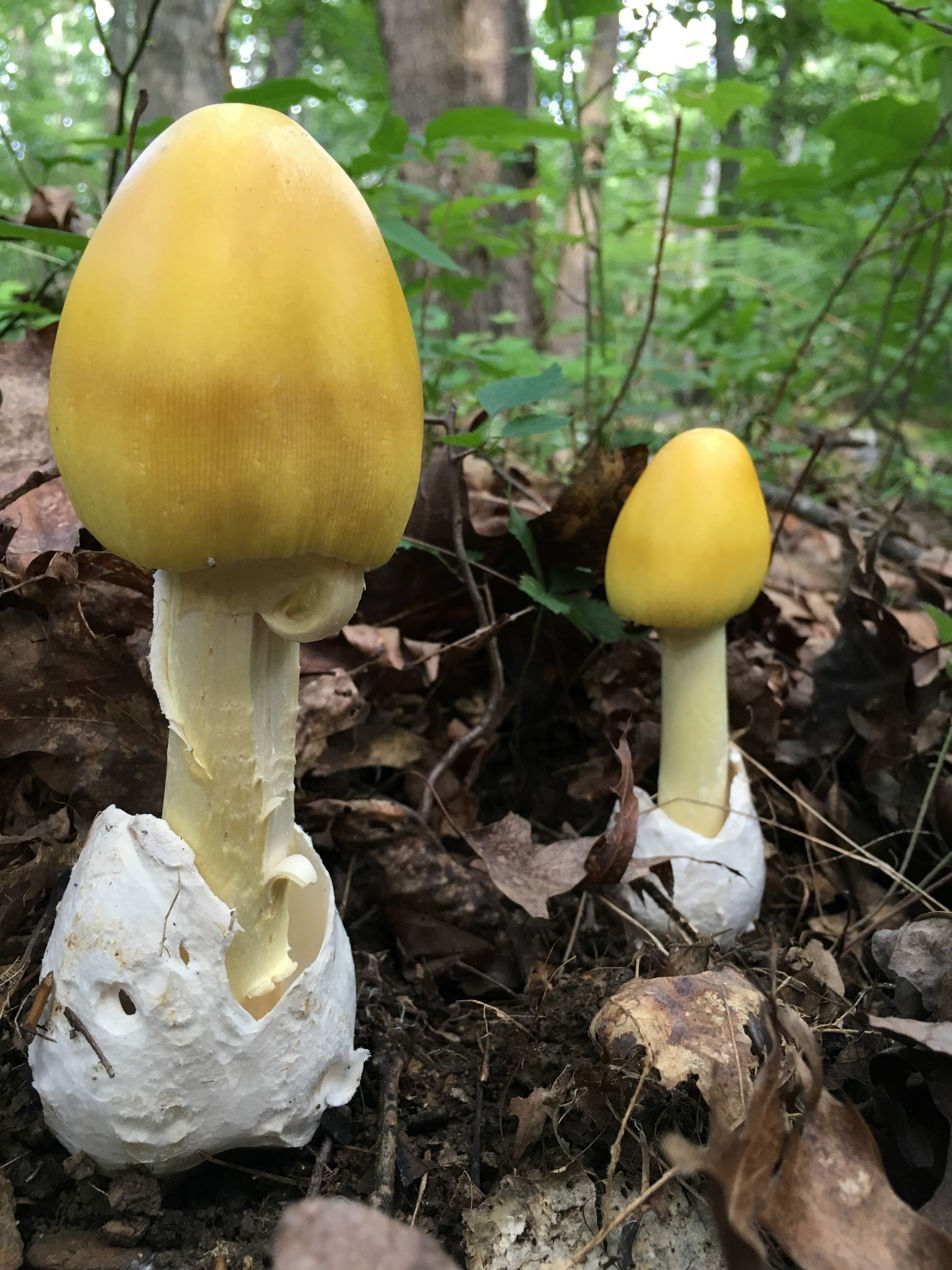
Amanita banningiana, named for Mary Elizabeth Banning

By the end of the 1880s, Mary's immediate family had died, and she found herself nearly penniless, with fading eyesight and growing rheumatism. She moved into a boarding-home in Winchester, Virginia. In 1889, she ended work on her manuscript, dedicating it to Peck, with whom she had corresponded for 30 years but never met. In 1890, she shipped the manuscript to Peck at the New York State Museum, writing "In parting from it I feel like taking leave of a beloved friend with whom I have spent many pleasant hours. Circumstances impel me to put it in a safe place". Peck placed the manuscript in a drawer, where it would remain for the next 91 years. In 1893 Banning wrote him that “Home duties occupied my time… I had rather die with the feeling of having done my duty than…having gratified an undying love for botany.” Banning died 13 years later, in 1903. She left her remaining money to the St. John's Orphanage for Boys. She was buried at St. John’s Church in Baltimore City.

== Legacy ==
In 1981, John Haines, a mycologist attached to the New York State museum as associate scientist, discovered Banning's manuscript. The museum organized the watercolors into the exhibit "Each a Glory Bright", which has been loaned to museums around the United States. Plates from the work can be viewed at the New York State Museum's page for this collection.

Banning's work featured in the 1996 exhibition “Where the Wild Things Are: The Nature of Maryland” at the Maryland Center for History and Culture and in “The Women of Talbot County” at the Talbot Historical Society in 2018.

An exhibition Outcasts: Mary Banning’s World of Mushrooms runs from March 11, 2025 to January 4, 2026 at the New York State Museum, centred around 28 of Banning's original watercolors and mushroom descriptions taken from her The Fungi of Maryland manuscript.

Mary Banning is the namesake of the provisional species Amanita Banningiana, the "Mary Banning Slender Caesar". Peck named one of the specimens Banning brought to him after her, calling it Hypomyces banningiae.

== Partial bibliography ==
- Banning, Mary E. "Notes on Fungi." Botanical Gazette 5, No. 1 (January 1880): 5-10. https://archive.org/details/botanicalgazette56hano (accessed Aug 1, 2013)
- Banning, M. E. (1881). "New Species of Fungi Found in Maryland. Agaricus (Tricholoma) cellaris". Botanical Gazette. 6 (1): 165–167. doi:10.1086/325440. JSTOR 2556568. S2CID 85395983.
- Banning, Mary E. "Maryland Fungi. I." Botanical Gazette 6, No. 4 (April 1881): 200-202. https://archive.org/details/botanicalgazette56hano (accessed Aug 1, 2013)
- Banning, Mary E. "Maryland Fungi. II." Botanical Gazette 6, No. 5 (May 1881): 210-215.https://archive.org/details/botanicalgazette56hano (accessed Aug 1, 2013)
- Banning, Mary E. (1882). "Preservative for Fungi". Bulletin of the Torrey Botanical Club. 9 (12): 153. JSTOR 2476196.
- Banning, Mary E. (1882). "The Tuckahoe". Bulletin of the Torrey Botanical Club. 9 (10): 125–126. doi:10.2307/2476029. JSTOR 2476029.
- Banning, Mary E. The fungi of Maryland. Unpublished manuscript in the possession of the New York State Museum. Plates accessible at http://www.nysm.nysed.gov/treasures/explore.cfm?coll=29 (Accessed Aug 1, 2013)
