= Jeanette Rosner Wolman =

American lawyer

- Born: New York City
- Died: January 17, 1999 (aged 96–97)

Jeannette Rosner Wolman (1902–1999) was a noted lawyer in Baltimore, Maryland. She was the first woman member of the Bar Association of Baltimore City and chairperson of the Maryland Commission on the Status of Women. In recognition of her activities, she was inducted into both the Baltimore Women’s Hall of Fame and the Maryland Women's Hall of Fame.

== Early life ==
The first born of eight siblings, Jeanette Rosner was born in 1902 in New York City to a Jewish family of Austrian descent. Her father, Adolph C. Rosner, was a businessman who emigrated to the United States in 1890. Her mother was a homemaker who was born in New York. The family moved to Birmingham, Alabama, sometime during her teenage years. In 1919, she graduated from Central High School in Birmingham.

As a high school student, Wolman sought admission to the Columbia University Law School. The dean of the law school responded, "Columbia does not admit women to its law school. If you're interested in going to college, apply at Barnard." Despite the admonishment, Wolman later became a distinguished and noted lawyer.

In 1920, her family moved again to the Park Circle neighborhood of Baltimore. She briefly enrolled at Goucher College, but withdrew to finish a three-month program at Baltimore Business College and start at the University of Maryland School of Law in 1921. During her law training, she worked as a social worker for the Jewish Children's Bureau and took night classes. She served as secretary for her graduating class of 1924, and subsequently was admitted to the Maryland Bar.

== Personal life ==
In 1925, she married another lawyer, Paul Carroll Wolman. She gave birth to two sons, Paul (born 1926) and Benjamin (born 1929). The family lived in the Windsor Hills neighborhood. From 1950 until Paul's death in 1978, the couple practiced law together in private practice.
