= Florence Peterson Kendall =

American physical therapist

- Born: May 5, 1910; Warman, Minnesota, U.S.
- Died: January 28, 2006 (aged 95); Severna Park, Maryland, U.S.
- Occupation: Physical therapist
- Known for: Maryland Women's Hall of Fame inductree

Florence May Peterson Kendall (May 5, 1910 – January 28, 2006) was an American physical therapist based in Baltimore, Maryland. She was inducted into the Maryland Women's Hall of Fame in 2002.

== Early life and education ==
Florence May Peterson was born near Warman, Minnesota, the eleventh child of her parents Charles Augustus Peterson and Mathilda Kruse Peterson, both Swedish immigrants. She graduated from the University of Minnesota in 1930. She pursued further training in physical therapy at Walter Reed Army Medical Center.

== Career ==
Kendall taught physical education at schools in Minnesota as a young woman. She treated young polio survivors in Baltimore in the 1930s and 1940s, and co-authored public health pamphlets with her husband. She also lectured, wrote, and made films for health education, especially on posture and polio, and ran a private clinic. She was a member of the faculties at the University of Maryland and Johns Hopkins Hospital School of Nursing. She was a founder and twice president (1939–41 and 1957–59) of the Maryland chapter of the American Physical Therapy Association (APTA). She served on the President's Council on Physical Fitness. She helped design workouts for Army personnel. She patented an arm sling designed to relief pressure on the wearer's neck. In 2002, she was inducted into the Maryland Women's Hall of Fame, and the Maryland chapter of APTA named her Physical Therapist of the Century.

== Publications ==
Kendall published articles and textbooks, many of them co-written with her husband. Her work appeared in professional journals, including Physical Therapy, The Journal of Health and Physical Education, The Physiotherapy Review, and Archives of Physical Medicine and Rehabilitation.

- "Study and Treatment of Muscle Imbalance in Cases of Low Back and Sciatic Pain" (1936, with Henry O. Kendall)
- "Care During the Recovery Period of Paralytic Poliomyelitis" (1939 pamphlet, with Henry O. Kendall)
- "Testing the Muscles of the Abdomen" (1941)
- "Gluteus Medius and Its Relation to Body Mechanics" (1941, with Henry O. Kendall)
- "The Role of Abdominal Exercise in a Program of Physical Fitness" (1943, with Henry O. Kendall)
- "Orthopedic and Physical Therapy Objectives in Poliomyelitis Treatment" (1947, with Henry O. Kendall)
- "Normal Flexibility According to Age Groups" (1948, with Henry O. Kendall and George E. Bennett)
- Muscles: Testing and Function (1949, with Henry O. Kendall)
- Posture and Pain (1952, with Henry O. Kendall and Dorothy A. Boynton)
- "A Criticism of Current Tests and Exercises for Physical Fitness" (1965)
- "Developing and Maintaining Good Posture" (1968, with Henry O. Kendall)
- "This I Believe" (1980)
- "Manual muscle testing: There is no substitute" (1991)
- Golfers: Take Care of Your Back (1995, with Susan McKinley Carpenter)
- "Sister Elizabeth Kenny revisited" (1998)

== Personal life and legacy ==
Florence Peterson married fellow physical therapist Henry Otis Kendall in 1935. They had three daughters. He died in 1979. Florence Peterson Kendall died from cancer in Severna Park, Maryland, in 2006, aged 95 years. She donated her personal library to the University of Maryland's Health and Human Services Library, to become the Kendall Historical Collection. The Henry O. and Florence P. Kendall Award is presented by APTA, in memory of the Kendalls. The Foundation for Physical Therapy awards a Florence P. Kendall Fellowship.
