= Mabel Houze Hubbard =

American judge

Mabel Evelyn Houze Hubbard

Maryland District Court
- In office 1981–1985
- Appointed by: Harry Hughes

Maryland Circuit Court
- In office 1985–1999
- Appointed by: Harry Hughes
- Preceded by: Robert B. Watts Sr.

Personal details
- Born: Mabel Evevlyn Houze; December 22, 1936 Detroit, Michigan
- Died: December 9, 2006 (aged 69) Baltimore, Maryland
- Citizenship: United States
- Spouse: Robert Hubbard
- Children: 2
- Education: University of Michigan
- Occupation: Judge
- Known for: First African-American woman to be a judge in Maryland

Mabel Evelyn Houze Hubbard (December 22, 1936 – December 9, 2006) was an American judge and teacher. After beginning her career as an English teacher and school administrator, she went back to school herself when she had children, enrolling in law school at the University of Maryland. This led to a second career as a jurist: in 1981, she was appointed by Governor Harry R. Hughes to the Maryland District Court for Baltimore City and four years later to the Circuit Court, again for Baltimore. She was the first African American woman in each of those roles.

== Early life ==
Mabel Evelyn Houze was born on December 22, 1936, in Detroit. She grew up in Mount Clemens, Michigan, the daughter of a restaurateur and a nurse. She attended college at the University of Michigan in Ann Arbor, earning a bachelor's degree in English in 1958, and pursued postgraduate studies at the University of Pittsburgh and the University of Pennsylvania.

== Career ==
She began her career as an English teacher in Pittsburgh and Philadelphia public schools, then worked as a vice principal and social worker. She married Robert Hubbard in 1964 and in 1970 they moved to Baltimore where he was assistant housing commissioner from 1970 to 1973 (and later a city official in Wilmington, Delaware). She taught English at Walbrook Senior High School, then left teaching to raise the couple's two sons.

As a stay-at-home parent, she was drawn to “learning for learning’s sake” and enrolled in law school at the University of Maryland, located in Baltimore, and took to it immediately—“She just loved it”, her son Robert told The Baltimore Sun. She graduated in 1975 and passed the bar the same year. She taught English for one more year, back at Walbrook High School in the 1975–1976 school year, then joined the office of the City Solicitor of Baltimore, first for a clerkship then as assistant city solicitor.

In 1978, she was appointed a master in the Juvenile and Domestic Relations Court of Baltimore, the first woman to hold the role. The appointment was also unusual for someone less than five years out of law school. Hubbard primarily dealt with juvenile cases, where her work was regarded as both fair and empathetic. In a 1986 interview she said she enjoyed that role, seeing low recidivism among the children whose cases she adjudicated: "I liked that job because most of the time a serious disciplinary intervention in the life of a wayward child makes a difference. Most kids don't come back." She continued there until 1981, when Governor Harry Hughes appointed her to the Maryland District Court for Baltimore City. Between this and her Master role, she is acknowledged as the first African American woman ever to become a judge in Maryland, having been excluded from the state bar entirely until 1950.

One of relatively few African-American judges in a city that was 70% African American, Hubbard was a well-known local figure. Though personally soft-spoken, she recognized the significance of her place in the community and generally agreed to the many requests she received to speak to civic and school groups. She also felt a responsibility to serve as a mentor, particularly hiring a dozen African-American women as clerks over the years and helping them build their careers; Lisa Gladden became a state senator.

Four years after becoming a district court judge, Hubbard was promoted, again by Hughes, to the Circuit Court for Baltimore City. She was then elected to a 15-year term the following year. She served until 1999 when she retired.

Inducted into the Maryland Women's Hall of Fame in 2002, the citation emphasized "her deliberate judicial temperament, her agile mind and spicy, witty sayings called 'Hubbardisms'" using the latter to help manage a sometimes-tense criminal courtroom. “If that is true there is not a dog in Georgia” was one favorite saying; another statement of disbelief came in the pronouncement, "I've got to stop coming to court with my neon sign on my forehead saying 'Fool. Fool. Fool.' That way you'll be [less] inclined to spit in my face and tell me it's raining."

== Death and legacy ==
Robert Hubbard died in 1992. Mabel Hubbard died on 9 December 2006 at Levindale Hebrew Geriatric Center & Hospital in Baltimore, Maryland, of complications from a fall. She was 69.

The Women's Committee of the J. Franklyn Bourne Bar Association presents an annual Mabel Hubbard Legacy Award to an individual who has tirelessly served the local community.

The new building for the Baltimore City District Court was named the Mabel H. Hubbard District Court in October 2025.
