= Robert Edward Black =

American physician

Robert Edward Black is an American physician, epidemiologist, and professor at the Johns Hopkins Bloomberg School of Public Health. He is a leading expert on prevention of childhood mortality and diseases, especially diarrheal diseases in low- and middle-income countries.

Black graduated in 1971 with an M.D. from Drexel University College of Medicine (which through merger and name change became Drexel University College of Medicine) and in 1976 with an M.P.H. from the University of California, Los Angeles.

In his research on childhood infectious diseases and nutritional problems, he was an epidemiologist at the Centers for Disease Control and at institutions in Bangladesh and Peru. He has served as an advisor in several international organizations and has received numerous honors and awards.

Black was elected in 2002 to the National Institute of Medicine (which in 2015 was renamed the National Academy of Medicine). He received in 2011, with Ananda Prasad and Kenneth H. Brown, the Prince Mahidol Award in Public Health, in 2011 the Canada Gairdner Global Health Award, and in 2016 the Jimmy and Rosalynn Carter Humanitarian Award. He was appointed a Foreign Member of the Royal Society in 2025.
