= 2014 United States House of Representatives elections in Maryland =

- November 4, 2014

All 8 Maryland seats to the United States House of Representatives
	Majority party	Minority party
Party	Democratic	Republican
Last election	7	1
Seats won	7	1
Seat change	Steady	Steady
Popular vote	978,267	704,400
Percentage	57.44%	41.36%
Swing	▼5.48%	▲8.16%

Democratic
40–50%
50–60%
60–70%
70–80%
80–90%
Republican
50–60%
60–70%
70–80%

The 2014 United States House of Representatives elections in Maryland were held on Tuesday, November 4, 2014, to elect the eight U.S. representatives from the state of Maryland, one from each of the state's eight congressional districts. The elections coincided with other elections to the United States Senate and House of Representatives and various state and local elections, including the governor of Maryland, attorney general of Maryland and comptroller of Maryland.

== Overview ==
United States House of Representatives elections in Maryland, 2014
Party	Votes	Percentage	+/–	Seats	+/–
Democratic	978,267	57.44%	-5.48%	7	-
Republican	704,400	41.36%	+8.16%	1	-
Green	9,088	0.54%	+0.15%		-
Libertarian	8,898	0.52%	-2.16%		-
Others	2,384	0.14%	-0.67%		-
Totals	1,703,037	100.00%	-	8	-

Popular vote
Democratic	57.44%
Republican	41.36%
Other	1.20%

House seats
Democratic	87.50%
Republican	12.50%

=== By district ===
Results of the 2014 United States House of Representatives elections in Maryland by district:

District	Democratic		Republican		Others		Total		Result
District	Votes	%	Votes	%	Votes	%	Votes	%	Result
District 1	73,843	29.49%	176,342	70.42%	233	0.09%	250,418	100.0%	Republican hold
District 2	120,412	61.32%	70,411	35.86%	5,531	2.82%	196,354	100.0%	Democratic hold
District 3	128,594	59.55%	87,029	40.30%	323	0.15%	215,946	100.0%	Democratic hold
District 4	134,628	70.18%	54,217	28.26%	2,992	1.56%	268,583	100.0%	Democratic hold
District 5	144,725	64.03%	80,752	35.72%	563	0.25%	226,040	100.0%	Democratic hold
District 6	94,704	49.70%	91,930	48.25%	3,902	2.05%	190,536	100.0%	Democratic hold
District 7	144,639	69.94%	55,860	27.01%	6,310	3.05%	206,809	100.0%	Democratic hold
District 8	136,722	60.74%	87,859	39.03%	516	0.23%	225,097	100.0%	Democratic hold
Total	978,267	57.44%	704,400	41.36%	20,370	1.20%	1,703,037	100.0%	

== District 1 ==
2014 Maryland's 1st congressional district election
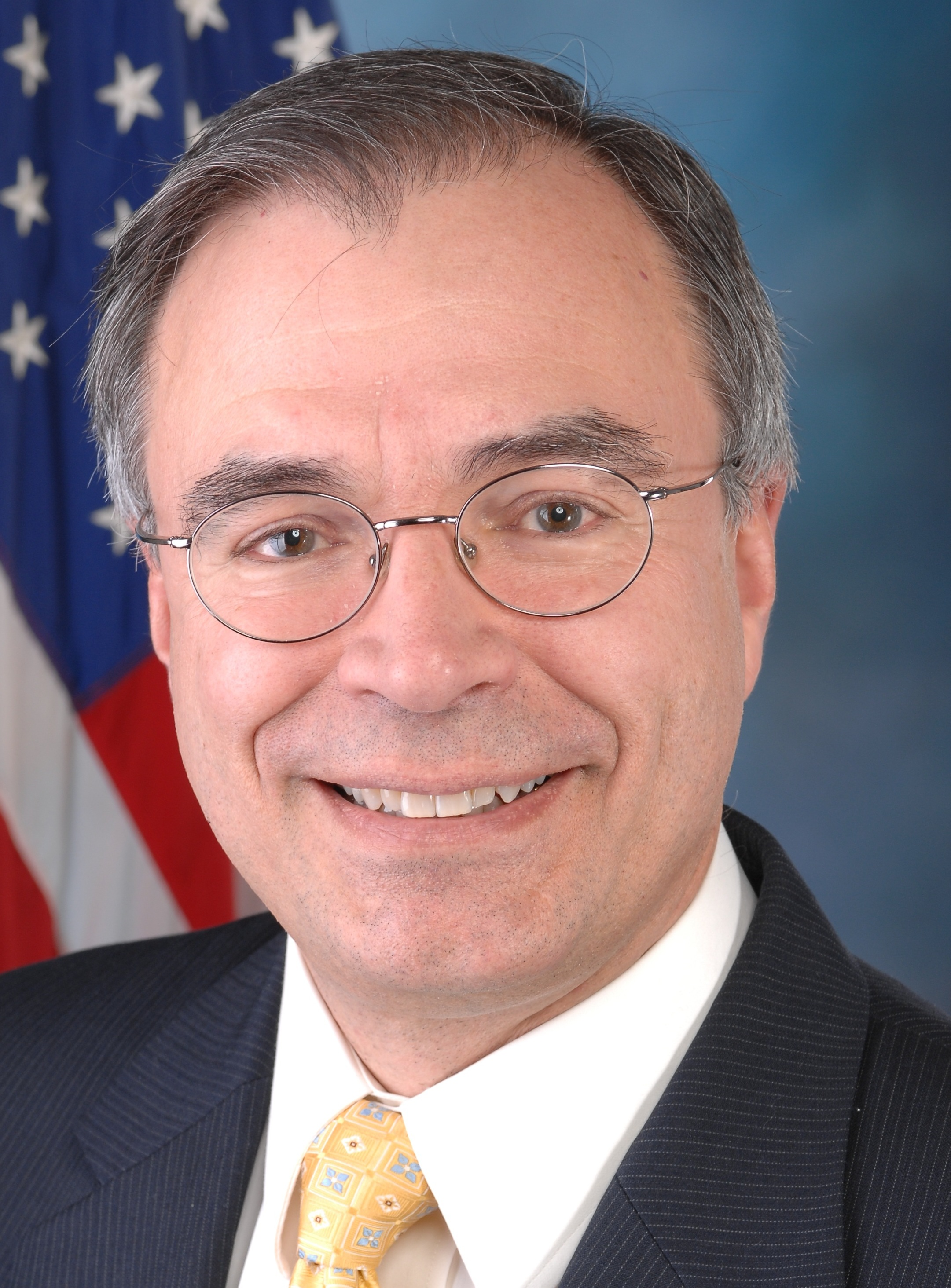

Nominee	Andy Harris	Bill Tilghman
Party	Republican	Democratic
Popular vote	176,342	73,842
Percentage	70.4%	29.5%
- Harris: 50–60% 60–70% 70–80% 80–90%
U.S. Representative before election
Andy Harris
Republican
Elected U.S. Representative
Andy Harris
Republican

The 1st district includes the entire Eastern Shore of Maryland as well as parts of Baltimore, Harford and Carroll counties. Incumbent Republican Andrew P. Harris, who had represented the district since 2011, ran for re-election. He was re-elected with 63% of the vote in 2012, and the district had a PVI of R+14.

=== Republican primary ===
==== Candidates ====
===== Nominee =====
- Andrew P. Harris, incumbent U.S. Representative

===== Eliminated in primary =====
- Jonathan Goff Jr.

==== Results ====
Republican primary results
Party	Candidate	Votes	%
Republican	Andrew P. Harris (incumbent)	45,477	77.9
Republican	Jonathan Goff, Jr.	12,913	22.1
Total votes		58,390	100.0

=== Democratic primary ===
==== Candidates ====
===== Nominee =====
- Bill Tilghman, retired attorney

===== Eliminated in primary =====
- John LaFerla, OB/GYN physician and Democratic-endorsed write-in candidate for this seat in 2012

===== Withdrawn =====
- Bridget Kelly (running for Maryland State Senate, District 35)
- Kimberley Letke, businesswoman and candidate for this seat in 2012 (running for Maryland State Senate, District 7)
- Joseph Werner (running for Harford County Executive)

==== Results ====
Democratic primary results
Party	Candidate	Votes	%
Democratic	Bill Tilghman	19,937	57.1
Democratic	John LaFerla	14,965	42.9
Total votes		34,902	100.0

=== General election ===
==== Predictions ====
Source	Ranking	As of
The Cook Political Report	Safe R	November 3, 2014
Rothenberg	Safe R	October 24, 2014
Sabato's Crystal Ball	Safe R	October 30, 2014
RCP	Safe R	November 2, 2014
Daily Kos Elections	Safe R	November 4, 2014

==== Results ====
Maryland's 1st congressional district, 2014
Party	Candidate	Votes	%
Republican	Andrew P. Harris (incumbent)	176,342	70.4
Democratic	Bill Tilghman	73,843	29.5
n/a	Write-ins	233	0.1
Total votes		250,418	100.0
Republican hold			

== District 2 ==
2014 Maryland's 2nd congressional district election
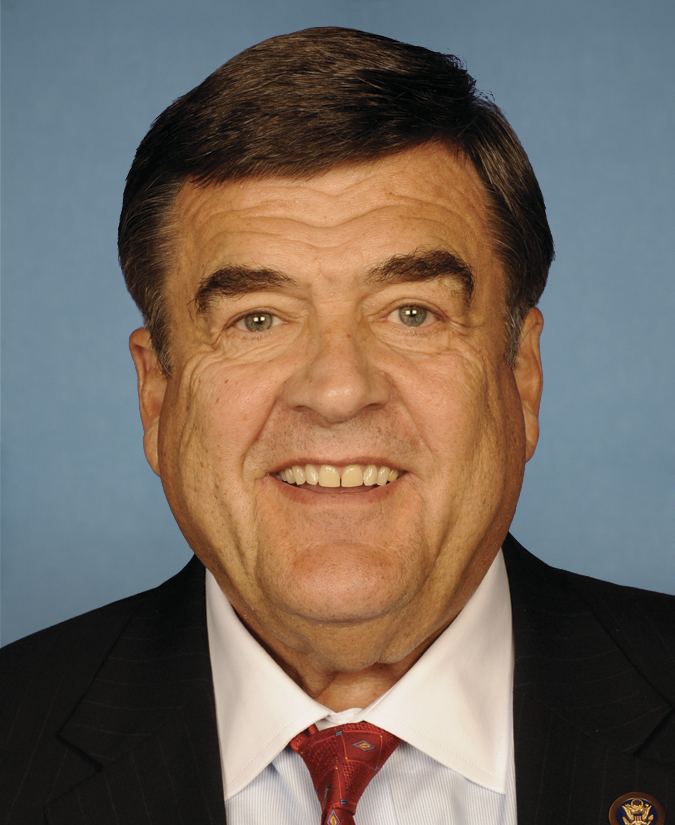

Nominee	Dutch Ruppersberger	David Banach
Party	Democratic	Republican
Popular vote	120,412	70,411
Percentage	61.3%	35.9%
- County results Ruppersberger: 50–60% 60–70% 80–90%
U.S. Representative before election
Dutch Ruppersberger
Democratic
Elected U.S. Representative
Dutch Ruppersberger
Democratic

The 2nd district includes parts of Howard, Harford, Baltimore and Anne Arundel Counties, as well as small portions of the City of Baltimore. Incumbent Democrat Dutch Ruppersberger, who had represented the district since 2003, ran for re-election. He was re-elected with 66% of the vote in 2012, and the district had a PVI of D+10. Ruppersberger considered running for Governor of Maryland in 2014, but decided against it.

=== Democratic primary ===
==== Candidates ====
===== Nominee =====
- Dutch Ruppersberger, incumbent U.S. Representative

===== Eliminated in primary =====
- Paul Rundquist, contractor intelligence analyst at the Department of Energy
- Blaine Taylor, former congressional aide and perennial candidate

==== Results ====
Democratic primary results
Party	Candidate	Votes	%
Democratic	Dutch Ruppersberger (incumbent)	43,614	77.6
Democratic	Paul Rundquist	6,450	11.4
Democratic	Blaine Taylor	6,164	11.0
Total votes		56,228	100.0

=== Republican primary ===
==== Candidates ====
===== Nominee =====
- David Banach, former United States Marine

==== Results ====
Republican primary results
Party	Candidate	Votes	%
Republican	David Banach	14,990	100.0

=== General election ===
==== Predictions ====
Source	Ranking	As of
The Cook Political Report	Safe D	November 3, 2014
Rothenberg	Safe D	October 24, 2014
Sabato's Crystal Ball	Safe D	October 30, 2014
RCP	Safe D	November 2, 2014
Daily Kos Elections	Safe D	November 4, 2014

==== Results ====
Maryland's 2nd congressional district, 2014
Party	Candidate	Votes	%
Democratic	Dutch Ruppersberger (incumbent)	120,412	61.3
Republican	David Banach	70,411	35.9
Green	Ian Schlakman	5,326	2.7
n/a	Write-ins	205	0.1
Total votes		196,354	100.0
Democratic hold			

== District 3 ==
2014 Maryland's 3rd congressional district election
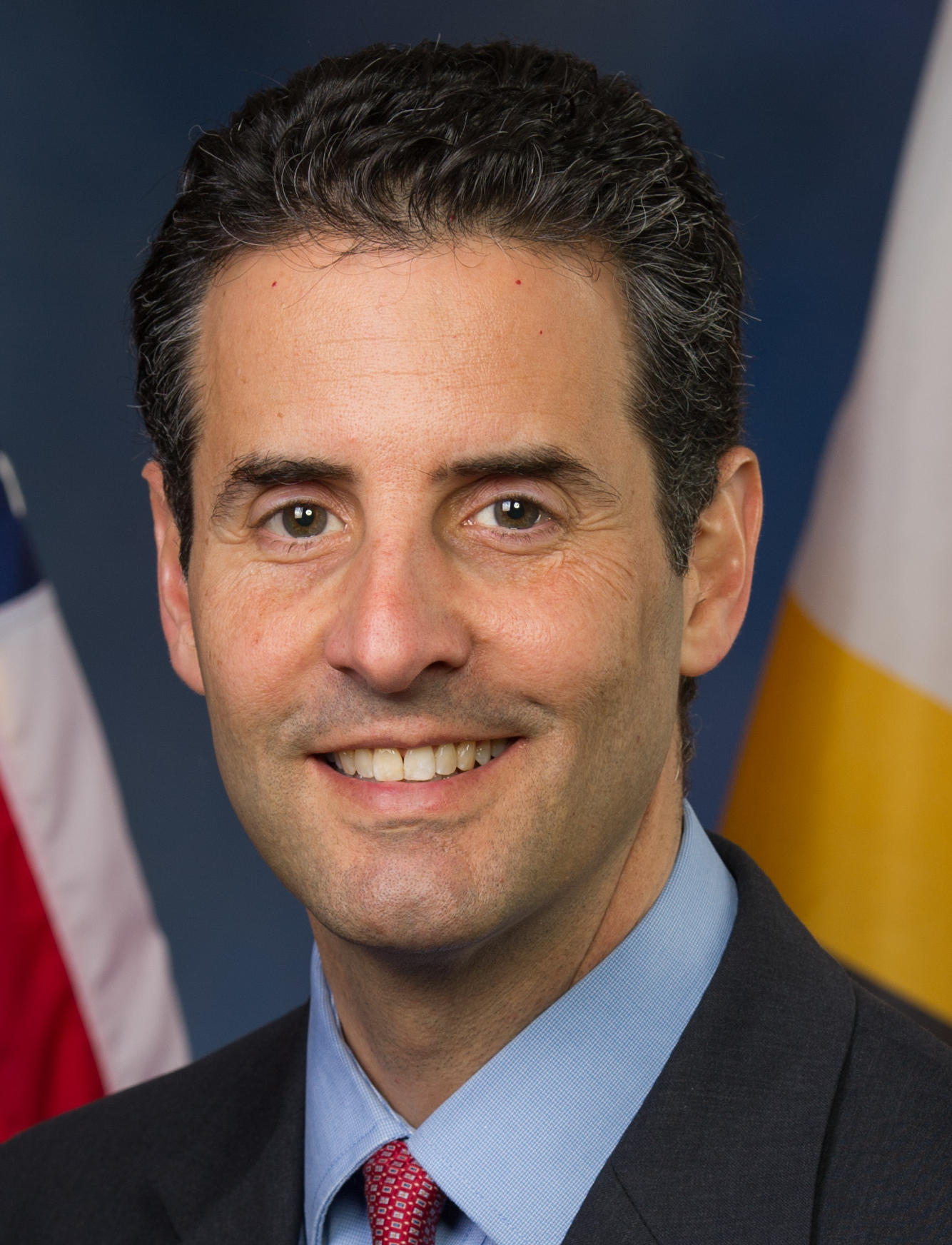

Nominee	John Sarbanes	Charles A. Long
Party	Democratic	Republican
Popular vote	128,594	87,029
Percentage	59.6%	40.3%
- County results Sarbanes: 50–60% 60–70% 70–80% Long: 50–60%
U.S. Representative before election
John Sarbanes
Democratic
Elected U.S. Representative
John Sarbanes
Democratic

The 3rd district includes parts of Baltimore, Howard, Montgomery and Anne Arundel counties, as well as a significant part of the City of Baltimore. Incumbent Democrat John Sarbanes, who had represented the district since 2007, ran for re-election. He was re-elected with 67% of the vote in 2012, and the district had a PVI of D+9.

=== Democratic primary ===
==== Candidates ====
===== Nominee =====
- John Sarbanes, incumbent U.S. Representative

===== Eliminated in primary =====
- Matthew Molyett

===== Primary results =====
Democratic primary results
Party	Candidate	Votes	%
Democratic	John Sarbanes (incumbent)	54,926	85.2
Democratic	Matthew Molyett	9,564	14.8
Total votes		64,490	100.0

=== Republican primary ===
==== Candidates ====
===== Nominee =====
- Charles A. Long, retired Johns Hopkins University chemistry professor

===== Eliminated in primary =====
- Thomas E. "Pinkston" Harris, insurance broker, nominee for this seat in 2008 and candidate for the seat in 2010 and 2012
- Michael Jackson, landscape company supervisor, candidate for the 1st district in 1992, and for the 3rd district in 2002

==== Results ====
Republican primary results
Party	Candidate	Votes	%
Republican	Charles A. Long	7,597	43.6
Republican	Thomas E. "Pinkston" Harris	7,303	41.9
Republican	Michael Jackson	2,524	14.5
Total votes		17,424	100.0

=== General election ===
==== Predictions ====
Source	Ranking	As of
The Cook Political Report	Safe D	November 3, 2014
Rothenberg	Safe D	October 24, 2014
Sabato's Crystal Ball	Safe D	October 30, 2014
RCP	Safe D	November 2, 2014
Daily Kos Elections	Safe D	November 4, 2014

==== Results ====
Maryland's 3rd congressional district, 2014
Party	Candidate	Votes	%
Democratic	John Sarbanes (incumbent)	128,594	59.6
Republican	Charles A. Long	87,029	40.3
n/a	Write-ins	323	0.1
Total votes		215,946	100.0
Democratic hold			

== District 4 ==
2014 Maryland's 4th congressional district election
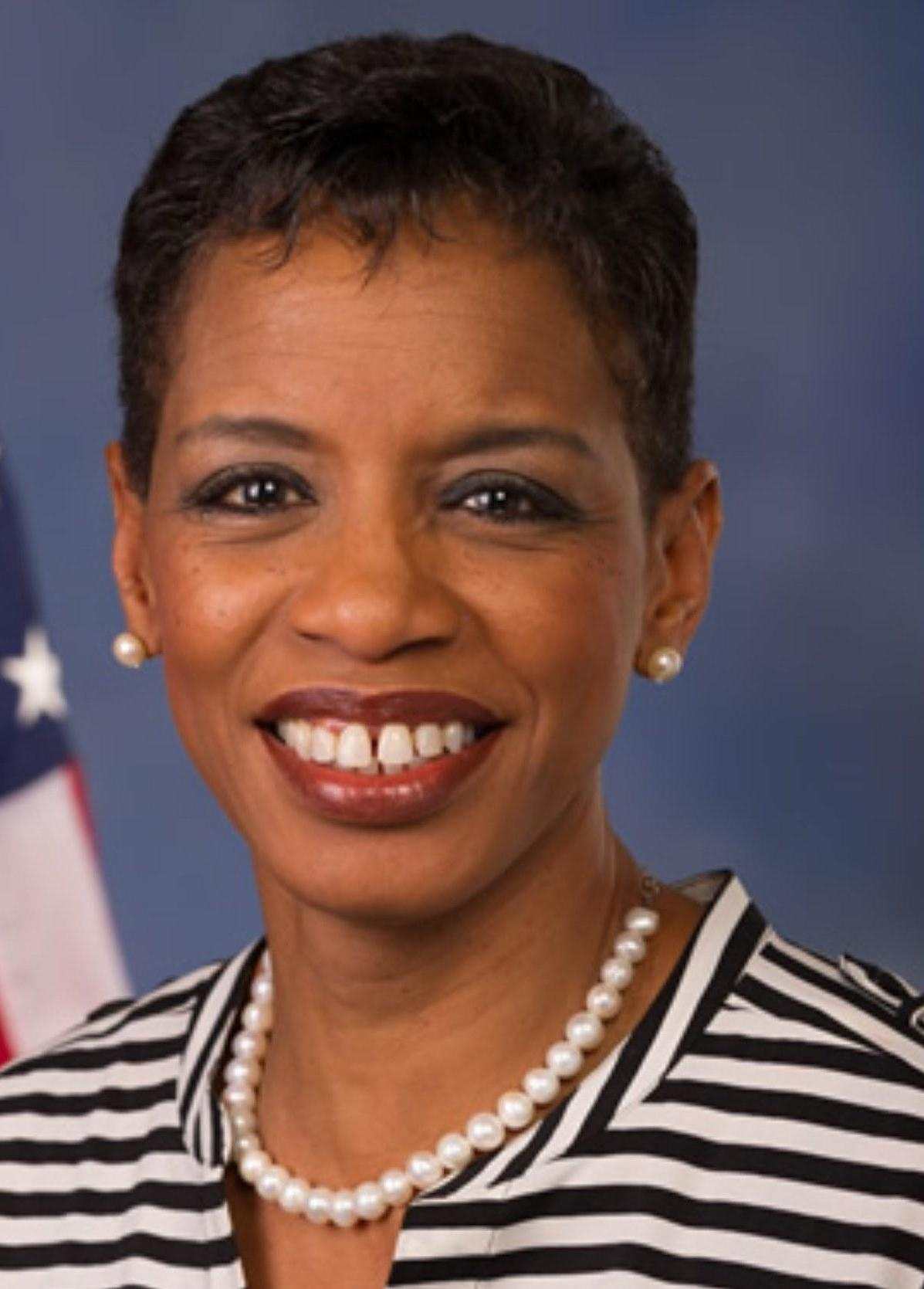

Nominee	Donna Edwards	Nancy Hoyt
Party	Democratic	Republican
Popular vote	134,628	54,217
Percentage	70.2%	28.3%
- County results Edwards: 90–100% Hoyt: 60–70%
U.S. Representative before election
Donna Edwards
Democratic
Elected U.S. Representative
Donna Edwards
Democratic

The 4th district includes parts of Prince George's, Montgomery, and Anne Arundel counties. Incumbent Democrat Donna Edwards, who had represented the district since 2008, ran for re-election. She was re-elected with 77% of the vote in 2012, and the district had a PVI of D+26.

=== Democratic primary ===
==== Candidates ====
===== Nominee =====
- Donna Edwards, incumbent U.S. Representative

===== Eliminated in primary =====
- Warren Christopher, retired United States Army lieutenant colonel

===== Withdrew =====
- Dawit H. Gebreyesus

==== Results ====
Democratic primary results
Party	Candidate	Votes	%
Democratic	Donna Edwards (incumbent)	53,648	87.0
Democratic	Warren Christopher	8,021	13.0
Total votes		61,669	100.0

=== Republican primary ===
==== Candidates ====
===== Nominee =====
- Nancy Hoyt, infection preventionist

===== Eliminated in primary =====
- John R. Graziani
- Greg Holmes, candidate for this seat in 2012
- George McDermott, Democratic candidate for the seat in 2004, 2006, 2008, 2010 and 2012

==== Results ====
Republican primary results
Party	Candidate	Votes	%
Republican	Nancy Hoyt	5,368	37.6
Republican	Greg Holmes	3,469	24.3
Republican	George McDermott	2,740	19.2
Republican	John R. Graziani	2,695	18.9
Total votes		14,272	100.0

=== General election ===
==== Predictions ====
Source	Ranking	As of
The Cook Political Report	Safe D	November 3, 2014
Rothenberg	Safe D	October 24, 2014
Sabato's Crystal Ball	Safe D	October 30, 2014
RCP	Safe D	November 2, 2014
Daily Kos Elections	Safe D	November 4, 2014

==== Results ====
Maryland's 4th congressional district, 2014
Party	Candidate	Votes	%
Democratic	Donna Edwards (incumbent)	134,628	70.2
Republican	Nancy Hoyt	54,217	28.3
Libertarian	Arvin Vohra	2,795	1.5
n/a	Write-ins	197	0.1
Total votes		191,837	100.0
Democratic hold			

== District 5 ==
2014 Maryland's 5th congressional district election
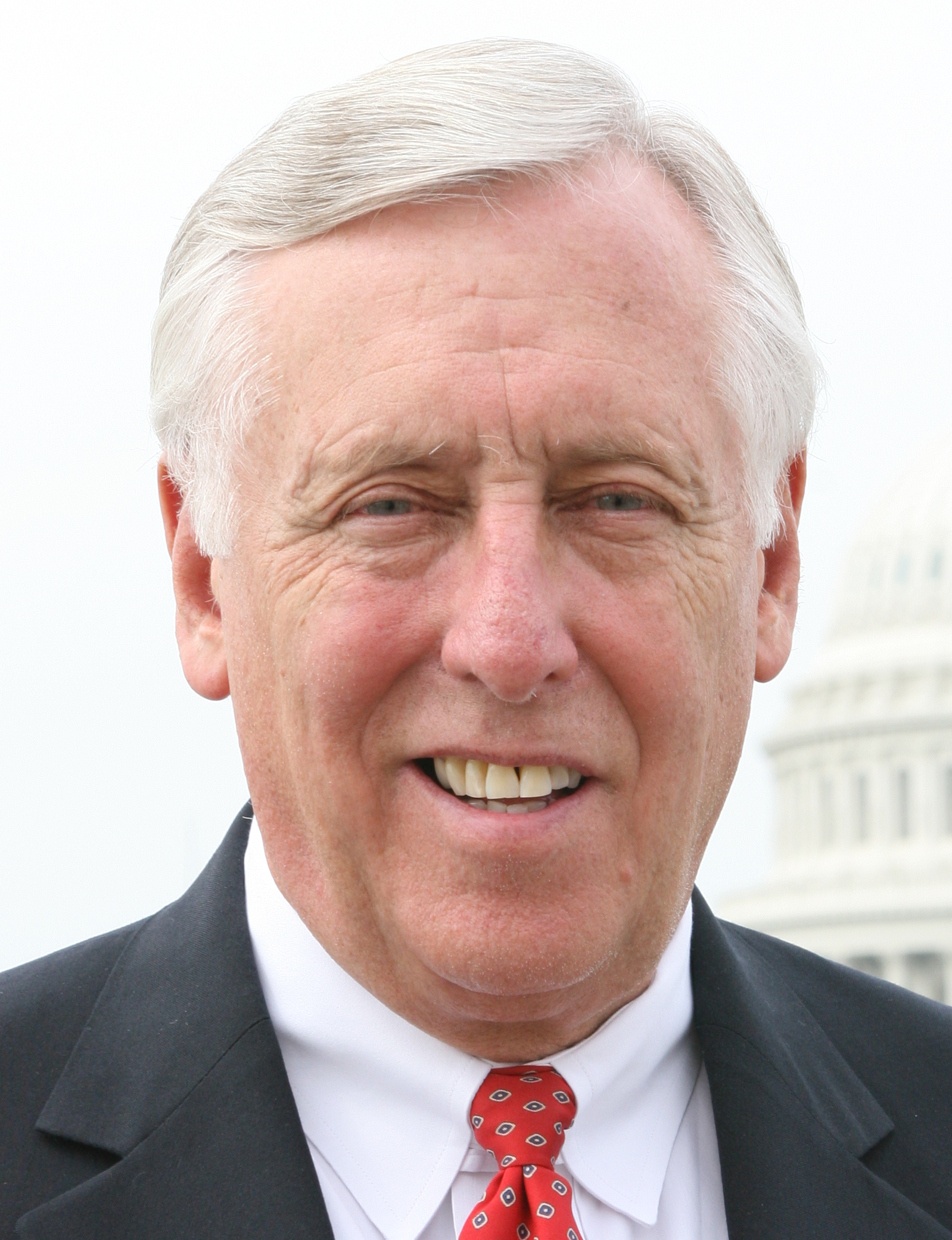

Nominee	Steny Hoyer	Chris Chaffee
Party	Democratic	Republican
Popular vote	144,725	80,752
Percentage	64.0%	35.7%
- County results Hoyer: 60–70% 80–90% Chaffee: 50–60%
U.S. Representative before election
Steny Hoyer
Democratic
Elected U.S. Representative
Steny Hoyer
Democratic

The 5th district includes all of Charles, St. Mary's, and Calvert counties, as well as portions of Prince George's and Anne Arundel counties. Incumbent Democrat Steny Hoyer, the House Minority Whip, who had represented the district since 1981, ran for re-election. He was re-elected with 69% of the vote in 2012, and the district had a PVI of D+14.

=== Democratic primary ===
==== Candidates ====
===== Nominee =====
- Steny Hoyer, incumbent U.S. Representative

==== Results ====
Democratic primary results
Party	Candidate	Votes	%
Democratic	Steny Hoyer (incumbent)	57,240	100.0

=== Republican primary ===
==== Candidates ====
===== Nominee =====
- Chris Chaffee, candidate for this seat in 2010

===== Eliminated in primary =====
- Mark Kenneth Arness
- Tom Potter

==== Results ====
Republican primary results
Party	Candidate	Votes	%
Republican	Chris Chaffee	8,137	41.6
Republican	Mark Kenneth Arness	6,050	30.9
Republican	Tom Potter	5,374	27.5
Total votes		19,561	100.0

=== General election ===
==== Predictions ====
Source	Ranking	As of
The Cook Political Report	Safe D	November 3, 2014
Rothenberg	Safe D	October 24, 2014
Sabato's Crystal Ball	Safe D	October 30, 2014
RCP	Safe D	November 2, 2014
Daily Kos Elections	Safe D	November 4, 2014

==== Results ====
Maryland's 5th congressional district, 2014
Party	Candidate	Votes	%
Democratic	Steny Hoyer (incumbent)	144,725	64.0
Republican	Chris Chaffee	80,752	35.7
n/a	Write-ins	563	0.3
Total votes		226,040	100.0
Democratic hold			

== District 6 ==
2014 Maryland's 6th congressional district election
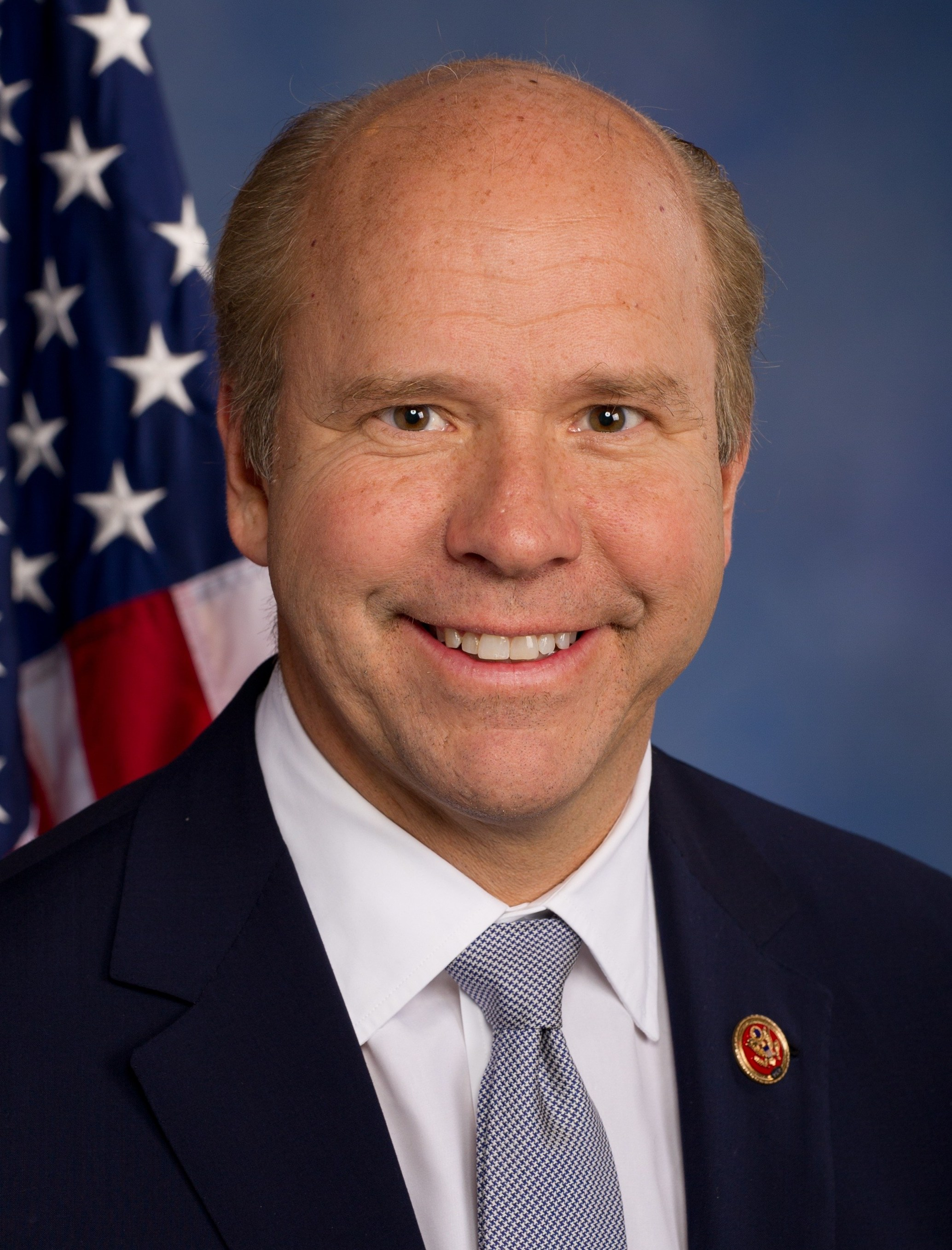

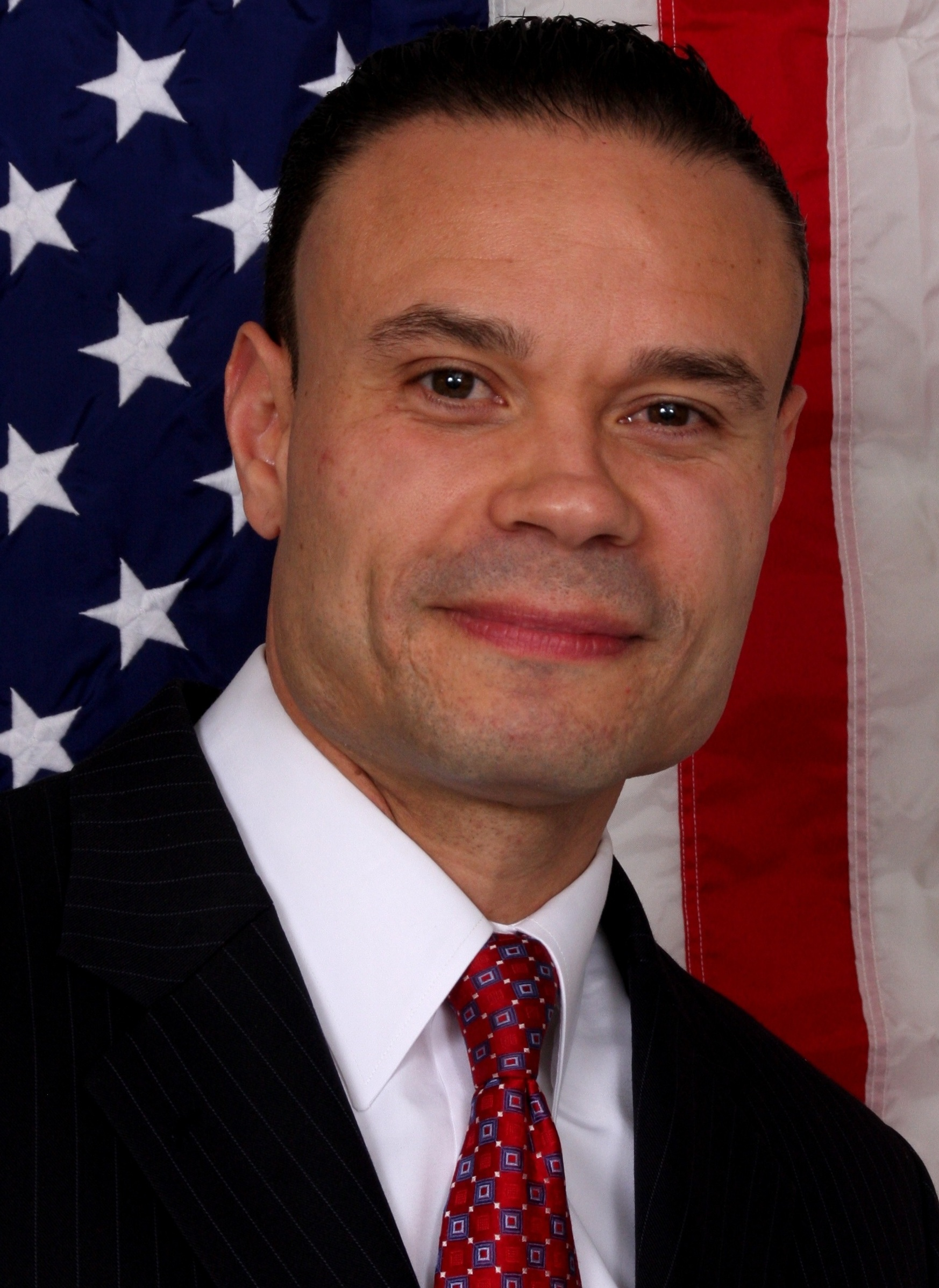
Nominee	John Delaney	Dan Bongino
Party	Democratic	Republican
Popular vote	94,704	91,930
Percentage	49.7%	48.2%
- County results Delaney: 50–60% 60–70% Bongino: 60–70% 70–80%
U.S. Representative before election
John Delaney
Democratic
Elected U.S. Representative
John Delaney
Democratic

The 6th district includes the entire Maryland Panhandle including all of Garrett, Allegany and Washington counties as well as portions of Montgomery and Frederick counties. Incumbent Democrat John Delaney, who had represented the district since 2013, ran for re-election. He was elected with 59% of the vote in 2012 against Republican incumbent Roscoe Bartlett, and the district had a PVI of D+4. Delaney considered running for Governor of Maryland in 2014, but decided against it.

=== Democratic primary ===
==== Candidates ====
===== Nominee =====
- John Delaney, incumbent U.S. Representative

==== Results ====
Democratic primary results
Party	Candidate	Votes	%
Democratic	John Delaney (incumbent)	33,289	100.0

=== Republican primary ===
==== Candidates ====
===== Nominee =====
- Dan Bongino, former United States Secret Service agent and nominee for the U.S. Senate in 2012

===== Eliminated in primary =====
- Harold W. Painter Jr., certified public accountant

===== Withdrawn =====
- David E. Vogt III, former United States Marine

==== Results ====
Republican primary results
Party	Candidate	Votes	%
Republican	Dan Bongino	23,933	83.5
Republican	Harold W. Painter, Jr.	4,718	16.5
Total votes		28,651	100.0

=== General election ===
==== Predictions ====
Source	Ranking	As of
The Cook Political Report	Likely D	November 3, 2014
Rothenberg	Safe D	October 24, 2014
Sabato's Crystal Ball	Safe D	October 30, 2014
RCP	Likely D	November 2, 2014
Daily Kos Elections	Likely D	November 4, 2014

==== Results ====
Maryland's 6th congressional district, 2014
Party	Candidate	Votes	%
Democratic	John Delaney (incumbent)	94,704	49.7
Republican	Dan Bongino	91,930	48.2
Green	George Gluck	3,762	2.0
n/a	Write-ins	140	0.1
Total votes		190,536	100.0
Democratic hold			

== District 7 ==
2014 Maryland's 7th congressional district election
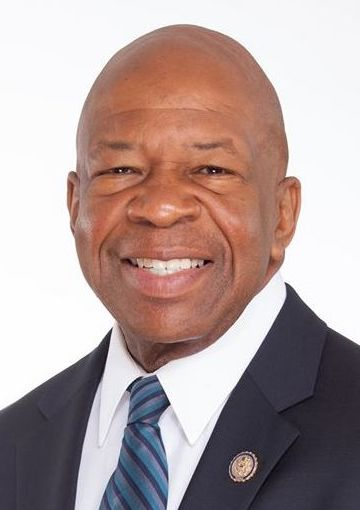

Nominee	Elijah Cummings	Corrogan R. Vaughn
Party	Democratic	Republican
Popular vote	144,639	55,860
Percentage	69.7%	27.2%
- County results Cummings: 50–60% 90–100%
U.S. Representative before election
Elijah Cummings
Democratic
Elected U.S. Representative
Elijah Cummings
Democratic

The 7th district includes just over half of the City of Baltimore, most of the majority African American sections of Baltimore County, and the majority of Howard County, Maryland. Incumbent Democrat Elijah Cummings, who had represented the district since 1996, ran for re-election. He was re-elected with 77% of the vote in 2012, and the district had a PVI of D+24.

=== Democratic primary ===
==== Candidates ====
===== Nominee =====
- Elijah Cummings, incumbent U.S. Representative

===== Eliminated in primary =====
- Alexander Bryant
- Fred Donald Dickson Jr., small business owner and Independent candidate for the seat in 2010

==== Results ====
Democratic primary results
Party	Candidate	Votes	%
Democratic	Elijah Cummings (incumbent)	69,790	90.6
Democratic	Alexander Bryant	4,786	6.2
Democratic	Fred Donald Dickson, Jr.	2,460	3.2
Total votes		77,036	100.0

=== Republican primary ===
==== Candidates ====
===== Nominee =====
- Corrogan R. Vaughn, perennial candidate

===== Eliminated in primary =====
- Ray Bly, perennial candidate

==== Results ====
Republican primary results
Party	Candidate	Votes	%
Republican	Corrogan R. Vaughn	6,293	54.8
Republican	Ray Bly	5,195	45.2
Total votes		11,488	100.0

=== General election ===
==== Predictions ====
Source	Ranking	As of
The Cook Political Report	Safe D	November 3, 2014
Rothenberg	Safe D	October 24, 2014
Sabato's Crystal Ball	Safe D	October 30, 2014
RCP	Safe D	November 2, 2014
Daily Kos Elections	Safe D	November 4, 2014

==== Results ====
Maryland's 7th congressional district, 2014
Party	Candidate	Votes	%
Democratic	Elijah Cummings (incumbent)	144,639	69.7
Republican	Corrogan R. Vaughn	55,860	27.2
Libertarian	Scott Soffen	6,103	3.0
n/a	Write-ins	207	0.1
Total votes		206,809	100.0
Democratic hold			

== District 8 ==
2014 Maryland's 8th congressional district election
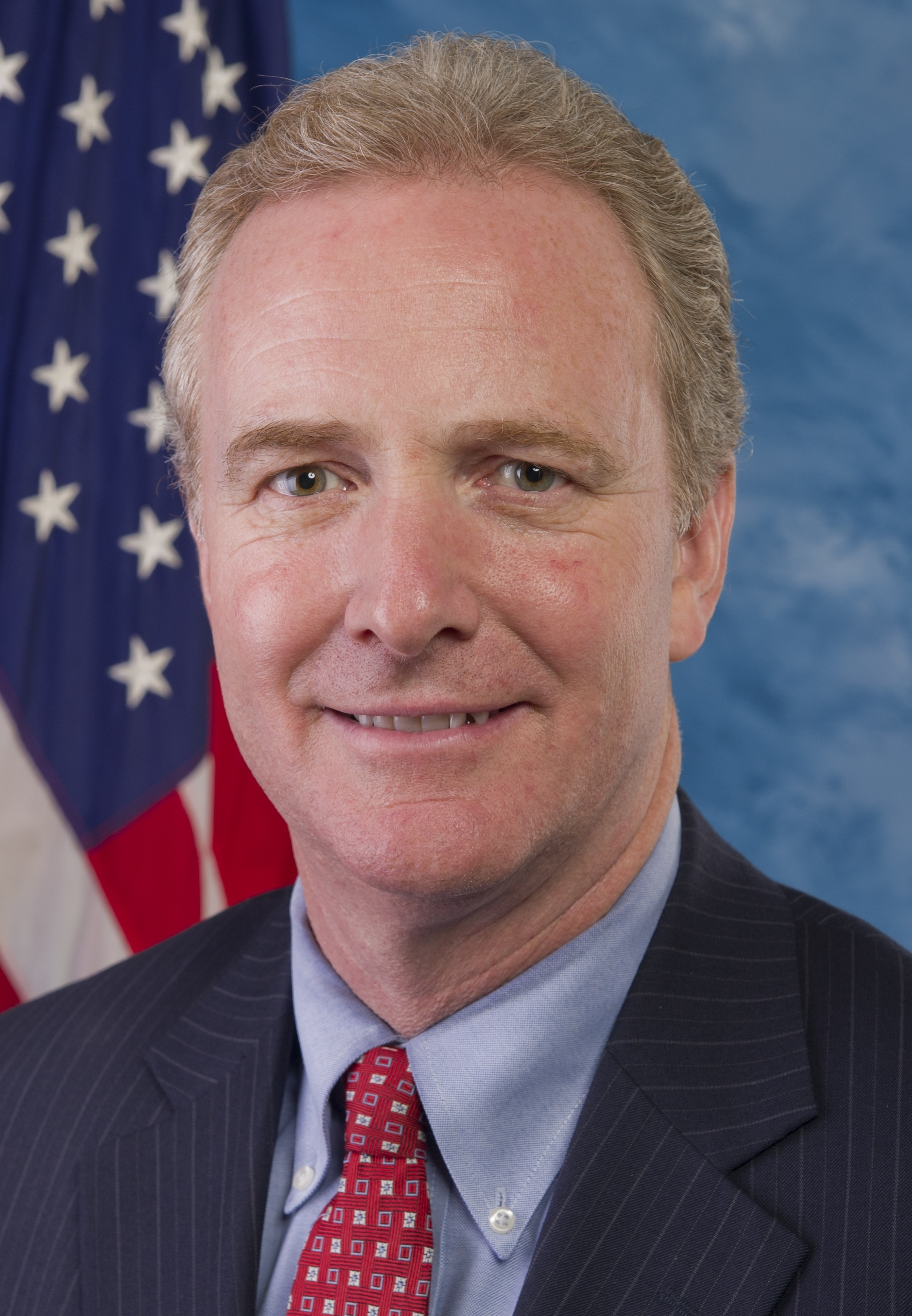

Nominee	Chris Van Hollen	Dave Wallace
Party	Democratic	Republican
Popular vote	136,722	87,859
Percentage	60.7%	39.0%
- County results Wallace: 60–70% 70–80% Hollen: 70–80%
U.S. Representative before election
Chris Van Hollen
Democratic
Elected U.S. Representative
Chris Van Hollen
Democratic

The 8th district includes parts of Carroll, Frederick and Montgomery counties. Incumbent Democrat Chris Van Hollen, who had represented the district since 2003, ran for re-election. He was re-elected with 63% of the vote in 2012, and the district had a PVI of D+11.

=== Democratic primary ===
==== Candidates ====
===== Nominee =====
- Chris Van Hollen, incumbent U.S. Representative

===== Eliminated in primary =====
- George English, perennial candidate
- Lih Young, economist and perennial candidate

==== Results ====
Democratic primary results
Party	Candidate	Votes	%
Democratic	Chris Van Hollen (incumbent)	60,556	91.3
Democratic	George English	3,834	5.8
Democratic	Lih Young	1,950	2.9
Total votes		66,240	100.0

=== Republican primary ===
==== Candidates ====
===== Nominee =====
- Dave Wallace, small business owner, candidate for the State House of Delegates in 2006 and 2010, and for this seat in 2012

==== Results ====
Republican primary results
Party	Candidate	Votes	%
Republican	Dave Wallace	22,648	100.0

=== General election ===
==== Predictions ====
Source	Ranking	As of
The Cook Political Report	Safe D	November 3, 2014
Rothenberg	Safe D	October 24, 2014
Sabato's Crystal Ball	Safe D	October 30, 2014
RCP	Safe D	November 2, 2014
Daily Kos Elections	Safe D	November 4, 2014

==== Results ====
Maryland's 8th congressional district, 2014
Party	Candidate	Votes	%
Democratic	Chris Van Hollen (incumbent)	136,722	60.7
Republican	Dave Wallace	87,859	39.0
n/a	Write-ins	516	0.3
Total votes		225,097	100.0
Democratic hold			

== See also ==
- 2014 United States House of Representatives elections
- 2014 United States elections
