= Dutch Ruppersberger =

American politician (born 1946)

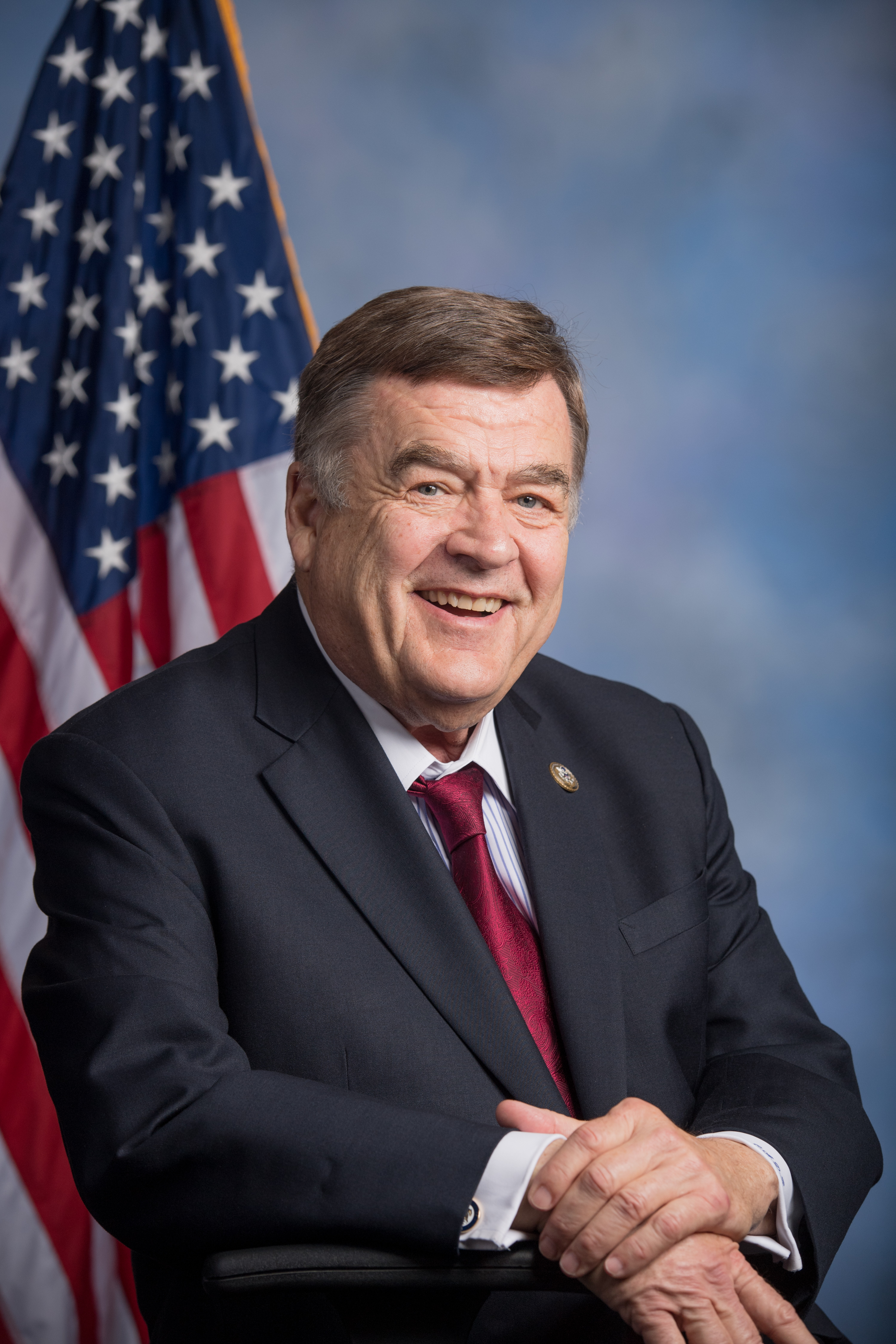

Ranking Member of the House Intelligence Committee
- In office January 3, 2011 – January 3, 2015
- Preceded by: Pete Hoekstra
- Succeeded by: Adam Schiff

Member of the U.S. House of Representatives from Maryland's 2nd district
- In office January 3, 2003 – January 3, 2025
- Preceded by: Bob Ehrlich
- Succeeded by: Johnny Olszewski

10th Executive of Baltimore County
- In office December 5, 1994 – December 2, 2002
- Preceded by: Roger B. Hayden
- Succeeded by: James T. Smith Jr.

Personal details
- Born: Charles Albert Ruppersberger III; January 31, 1946 (age 80) Baltimore, Maryland, U.S.
- Party: Democratic
- Spouse: Kay Murphy (m. 1971)
- Children: 2
- Education: University of Maryland, College Park (BA); University of Baltimore (JD)
- Rupperberger's voice Ruppersberger supporting the 2013 Intelligence Authorization Act. Recorded May 31, 2012

Charles Albert "Dutch" Ruppersberger III (/ˈruːpərsbɜːrɡər/ ROO-pərss-bur-gər; born January 31, 1946) is an American lawyer and politician who served as the U.S. representative for Maryland's 2nd congressional district from 2003 to 2025. A member of the Democratic Party, he served as an assistant state attorney of Maryland from 1972 to 1980, a Baltimore County councilman from 1985 to 1994, and Baltimore County Executive from 1994 until 2002. He was the ranking member of the United States House Permanent Select Committee on Intelligence from 2011 to 2015.

He announced in January 2024 that he would retire from the United States House of Representatives at the conclusion of the 118th United States Congress.

== Early life, education and career ==
Ruppersberger was born in Baltimore, the son of Margaret "Peggy" (née Wilson) and Charles Albert "Al" Ruppersberger, Jr. He is of part German descent. He graduated from the Baltimore City College high school in 1963 and attended the University of Maryland, College Park, where he played lacrosse. He earned his Juris Doctor (JD) from the University of Baltimore School of Law.

Ruppersberger began his career as a Baltimore County Assistant State's Attorney. He was soon promoted to chief of the State's Attorney Office Investigative Division, pursuing organized crime, political corruption, and drug trafficking. He was elected to the Baltimore County Council in 1985 and again in 1989, chosen twice as council chairman. In 1994 and 1998, he was elected Baltimore County Executive.

Ruppersberger decided to run for office after a near-fatal car crash while investigating a drug trafficking case. He served as vice chairman on the board of visitors for the hospital that saved his life. He also served on the United States Naval Academy Board of Visitors.

== U.S. House of Representatives ==
=== Committee assignments ===
- Committee on Appropriations
  - Subcommittee on Defense
  - Subcommittee on State, Foreign Operations, and Related Programs

Previous

- Permanent Select Committee on Intelligence (Ranking Member, 113th and 114th Congresses)

=== Caucus memberships ===
- Congressional Equality Caucus
- Congressional NextGen 9-1-1 Caucus
- Rare Disease Caucus
- United States Congressional International Conservation Caucus
- U.S.-Japan Caucus
- United States–China Working Group
- Congressional Caucus on Turkey and Turkish Americans

=== Party leadership ===
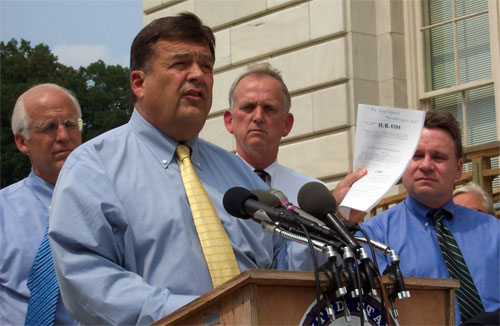
Ruppersberger calls on Congress to create a cabinet level intelligence director on August 3, 2004.

Ruppersberger was the first Democrat freshman to be appointed to the House Intelligence Committee. He was named to this committee because his district is home to the National Security Agency. From 2011 to 2015, he served as the committee's ranking Democrat. The position placed Ruppersberger on the elite "Gang of Eight", the chairs and ranking members of the U.S. House and Senate Intelligence Committees along with the Senate Majority Leader, Senate Minority Leader, House Speaker and House Minority Leader. By law, the president must keep the Gang of Eight informed of the country's most secret intelligence activities to maintain proper oversight.

=== Agriculture ===
In September 2019, Ruppersberger was one of nine lawmakers who signed a letter to Agriculture Secretary Sonny Perdue urging him to reconsider a proposed rule change that would affect the number of Americans that qualified for SNAP, noting that it would be "Maryland’s most vulnerable residents, including children, seniors, and people with disabilities, who would suffer the painful consequences of unnecessary and preventable hunger."

=== Operation Hero Miles ===
In 2003, Ruppersberger created the national "Hero Miles" program to allow Americans to donate their frequent flyer miles to wounded warriors recovering at military or Veterans Administration medical centers as well as to friends and family visiting them. In 2012, he authored legislation expanding the program to enable Americans to donate their hotel reward points to military families. Both the Hero Miles and Hotels for Heroes programs are administered by Fisher House, a nonprofit organization that opens its homes to military families visiting their injured loved ones at hospitals across the country. He won a Charles Dick Medal of Merit in 2004 for this initiative, becoming the last Marylander to win this award, which was previously awarded to U.S. Representative Beverly Byron (1992), State Senator John Astle (1993), U.S. Senator Barbara Mikulski (1994), U.S. Representative Roscoe Bartlett (1998) and State Delegate Peter Franchot (1999).

=== Municipal finance ===
Ruppersberger is an advocate of municipal finance and tax-exempt municipal bonds. In 2013, he and Representative Randy Hultgren secured the signatures of 137 other House members in a letter to congressional leaders asking that they "reject any proposal to cap or eliminate the deduction on tax-exempt municipal bonds used to finance the vast majority of infrastructure projects in America's communities." They circulated a similar letter in 2015 and formed the Municipal Finance Caucus in 2016.

=== Cyber Intelligence Sharing and Protection Act ===
Ruppersberger and Representative Mike Rogers co-sponsored the Cyber Intelligence Sharing and Protection Act, designed to increase intelligence sharing between private cyber security firms and government agencies. More than 60 businesses and trade organizations submitted letters of support, including the U.S. Chamber of Commerce, Time Warner, Verizon and AT&T, IBM and Intel. Despite several amendments to address privacy concerns, some groups, such as the Electronic Frontier Foundation, have criticized the act for lacking civil liberties protections, claiming that it authorizes government surveillance of private communications and allows companies to hand over large amounts of personal information on their clients without a warrant or judicial oversight, thereby creating a cybersecurity loophole in existing privacy laws, such as the Wiretap Act and the Electronic Communications Privacy Act. CISPA passed the House of Representatives on April 26, 2012. It was reintroduced into the House on February 13, 2013, and passed on April 18 by a bipartisan vote of 288–127. Of the 92 Democrats who supported the bill, many of them cited significant privacy improvements over the 2012 version.

=== Biosecurity ===
On October 19, 2017, at the Emergent Biosolutions manufacturing facility in Maryland, Ruppersberger received the Congressional Biosecurity Champion Award from the Alliance for Biosecurity, a D.C.-based public-interest organization, for "his leadership and actions taken in Congress to improve U.S. national security, preparedness and response for biosecurity threats." He was one of eight members of Congress to receive the award.

=== Syria ===
After President Donald Trump launched an airstrike on Syria in April 2017, Ruppersberger expressed hope that "Russia and Iran stand by the international community in condemning Assad's use of chemical weapons and cooperate in finding an appropriate way forward", and said the U.S. needed "a larger, thoughtful strategy to address the situation in Syria, including the defeat of ISIS."

In October 2019, Ruppersberger said he was concerned "about the instability now in the entire Middle East, and now we're really helping to make Russia even stronger in the Middle East", and that American troops were expressing concern and embarrassment over leaving behind the Kurds.

=== Yemeni civil war ===
In December 2018, The Young Turks reported that Ruppersberger, "one of five Democrats who joined the majority of House Republicans to block debate on the war in Yemen, had met with Saudi officials and foreign agents representing them on numerous occasions".

In February 2019, Ruppersberger voted for Ro Khanna's resolution to direct the removal of U.S. armed forces from hostilities in the Republic of Yemen that have not been authorized by Congress.

=== Retirement ===
Ruppersberger announced on January 26, 2024, that he would not run for reelection, thus retiring from the House at the conclusion of the 118th United States Congress. He stated that it was "time to pass the torch to a younger generation of leaders and I am looking forward to spending more time with my family".

== Political positions ==
Ruppersberger has voted with President Joe Biden's stated position 100% of the time in the 117th Congress, according to a FiveThirtyEight analysis.

== Political campaigns ==
Barred from a third term as county executive, Ruppersberger opted to run for Congress in 2002 after 2nd district Congressman Bob Ehrlich ran for governor. The Maryland General Assembly significantly altered the 2nd by shifting most of its share of heavily Republican Harford County to the already Republican-leaning 1st and 6th districts, respectively based on the Eastern Shore and in Western Maryland. In its place, the legislature added a heavily Democratic portion of Baltimore City that had previously been in the 1st district. This made the district significantly friendlier to Democrats than its predecessor.

Before running for Congress, Ruppersberger legally changed his name so that his lifelong nickname, "Dutch," could appear on the ballot. He defeated Republican nominee Helen Delich Bentley, who had represented the 2nd district from 1985 to 1995, with 55% of the vote. He has never faced another close contest and has been reelected ten times.

An August 2011 editorial by The Washington Post described the 2nd district's configuration as "curlicue territories strung together by impossibly delicate tendrils of land" and "a crazy-quilt confection drawn for the express purpose of ousting the incumbent at the time, Rep. (and later Gov.) Robert L. "Bob" Ehrlich Jr., a Republican, and installing C.A. Dutch Ruppersberger, a Democrat who still holds the job."

== Electoral history ==
Year	Office	Election	Subject	Party	Votes	%	Opponent	Party	Votes	%
1994	Baltimore County Executive	General	Dutch Ruppersberger	Democratic	119,555	54.06	Roger B. Hayden	Republican	101,598	45.94
1998	Baltimore County Executive	General	Dutch Ruppersberger	Democratic	166,482	70.47	John J. Bishop	Republican	69,449	29.4
2002	Maryland's 2nd congressional district	General	Dutch Ruppersberger	Democratic	105,718	54.16	Helen Delich Bentley	Republican	88,954	45.57
2004	Maryland's 2nd congressional district	General	Dutch Ruppersberger	Democratic	164,751	66.62	Jane Brooks	Republican	75,812	30.66
2006	Maryland's 2nd congressional district	General	Dutch Ruppersberger	Democratic	135,818	69.21	Jimmy Mathis	Republican	60,195	30.68
2008	Maryland's 2nd congressional district	General	Dutch Ruppersberger	Democratic	198,578	71.9	Richard Pryce Matthews	Republican	68,561	24.8
2010	Maryland's 2nd congressional district	General	Dutch Ruppersberger	Democratic	134,133	64.21	Marcelo Cardarelli	Republican	69,523	33.28
2012	Maryland's 2nd congressional district	General	Dutch Ruppersberger	Democratic	194,088	65.6	Nancy C. Jacobs	Republican	92,071	31.1
2014	Maryland's 2nd congressional district	General	Dutch Ruppersberger	Democratic	115,586	61.3	David Banach	Republican	67,995	36.0
2016	Maryland's 2nd congressional district	General	Dutch Ruppersberger	Democratic	172.324	62.2	Patrick L. McDonough	Republican	92.099	33.3
2018	Maryland's 2nd congressional district	General	Dutch Ruppersberger	Democratic	167,201	66.0	Elizabeth Matory	Republican	77,782	30.7
2020	Maryland's 2nd congressional district	General	Dutch Ruppersberger	Democratic	224,836	67.7	Johnny Ray Salling	Republican	106,355	32.0
2022	Maryland's 2nd congressional district	General	Dutch Ruppersberger	Democratic	159,000	59.3	Nicolee Ambrose	Republican	109,081	40.7

== Personal life ==
Ruppersberger married his high school sweetheart Kay Murphy in 1971 and has two children and five grandchildren.

Political offices
Preceded by Roger Hayden	Executive of Baltimore County; 1994–2002	Succeeded by James Smith
U.S. House of Representatives
Preceded by Bob Ehrlich	Member of the U.S. House of Representatives from Maryland's 2nd congressional district 2003–2025	Succeeded by Johnny Olszewski
Preceded by Pete Hoekstra	Ranking Member of the House Intelligence Committee; 2011–2015	Succeeded by Adam Schiff
U.S. order of precedence (ceremonial)
Preceded by Chris Shays as Former U.S. Representative	Order of precedence of the United States as Former U.S. Representative	Succeeded by James Langevin as Former U.S. Representative
