= 2002 United States House of Representatives elections in Maryland =

- November 5, 2002

All 8 Maryland seats to the United States House of Representatives
	Majority party	Minority party
Party	Democratic	Republican
Seats before	4	4
Seats won	6	2
Seat change	▲2	▼2
Popular vote	904,250	752,911
Percentage	54.50%	45.38%
Swing	▼0.56%	▲0.94%

Democratic
50–60%
60–70%
70–80%
80–90%
Republican
50–60%
60–70%
70–80%
80–90%

The Maryland Congressional elections of 2002 were held on Tuesday, November 5, 2002. The terms of all eight Representatives to the United States House of Representatives expired on January 3, 2003, and therefore all were put up for contest. The winning candidates served a two-year term from January 3, 2003, to January 3, 2005.

== Overview ==
United States House of Representatives elections in Maryland, 2002
Party	Votes	Percentage	+/–	Seats	+/–
Democratic	904,250	54.50%	-0.56%	6	+2
Republican	752,911	45.38%	+0.94%	2	-2
Green	158	0.01%	-	0	—
Others	1,794	0.11%	-	0	—
Totals	1,659,113	100.00%	-	8	—

== District 1 ==
2002 Maryland's 1st congressional district election
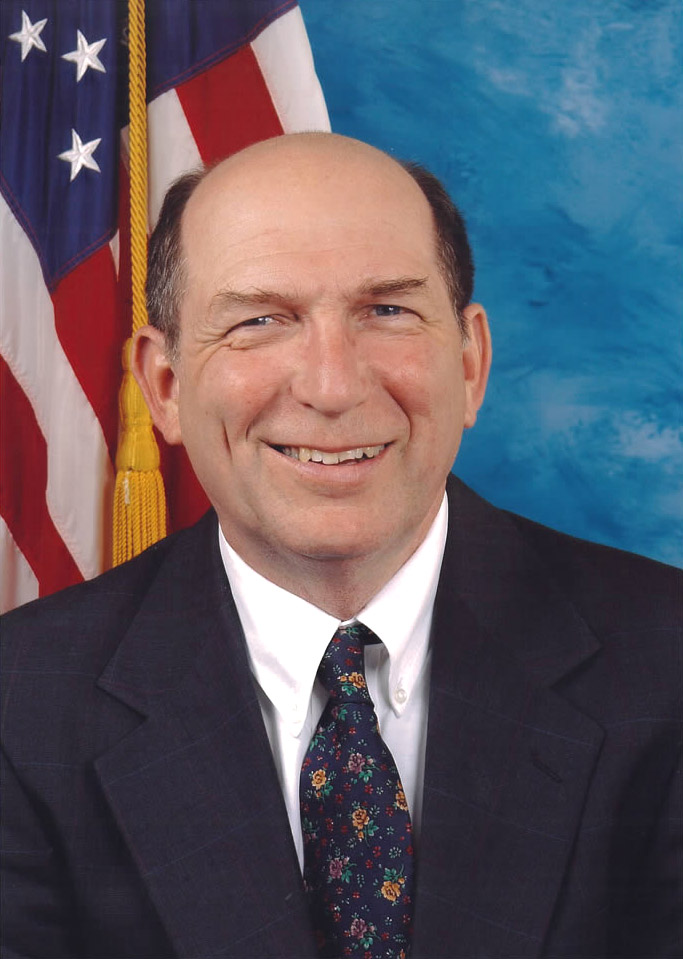

Nominee	Wayne Gilchrest	Amy D. Tamlyn
Party	Republican	Democratic
Popular vote	192,004	57,986
Percentage	76.8%	23.2%
- County results Gilchrest: 70–80% 80–90%
U.S. Representative before election
Wayne Gilchrest
Republican
Elected U.S. Representative
Wayne Gilchrest
Republican

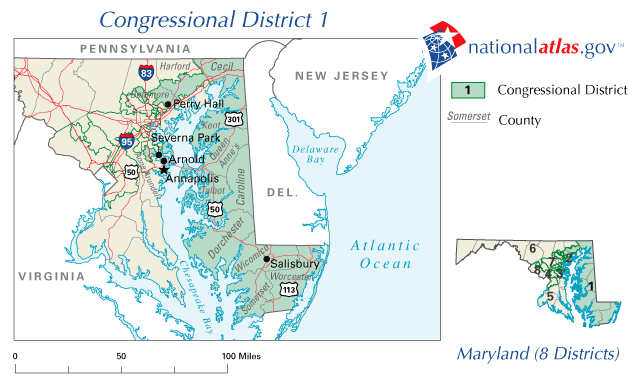

=== Predictions ===
Source	Ranking	As of
Sabato's Crystal Ball	Safe R	November 4, 2002
New York Times	Safe R	October 14, 2002

=== Results ===
Marylands's 1st congressional district election, 2002
Party	Candidate	Votes	%
Republican	Wayne Gilchrest (inc.)	192,004	76.83
Democratic	Amy D. Tamlyn	57,986	23.20
Total votes		249,900	100.00
Republican hold			

== District 2 ==
2002 Maryland's 2nd congressional district election
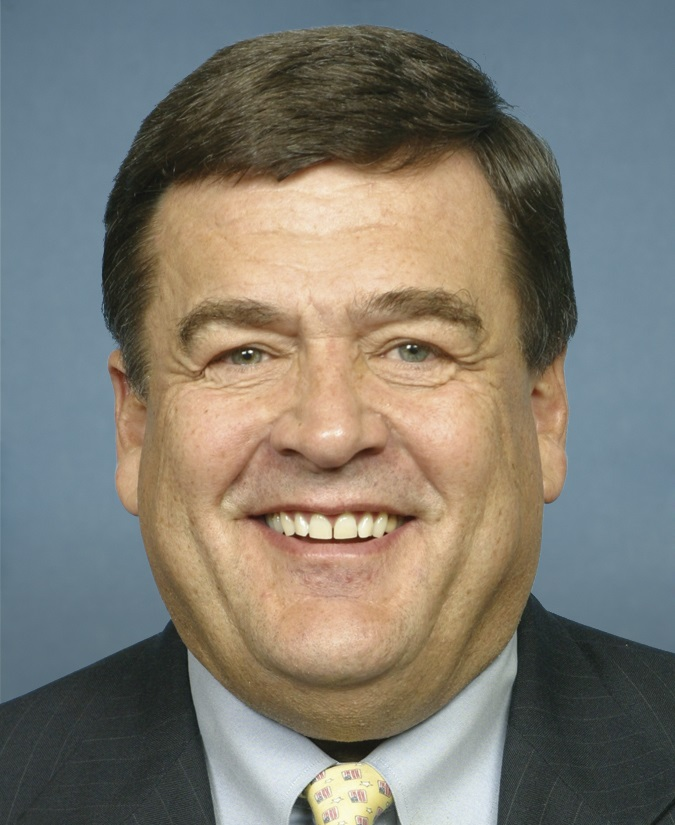

Nominee	Dutch Ruppersberger	Helen Delich Bentley
Party	Democratic	Republican
Popular vote	105,718	88,954
Percentage	54.3%	45.7%
- County results Ruppersberger: 50–60% 70–80% Bentley: 50–60%
U.S. Representative before election
Bob Ehrlich
Republican
Elected U.S. Representative
Dutch Ruppersberger
Democratic

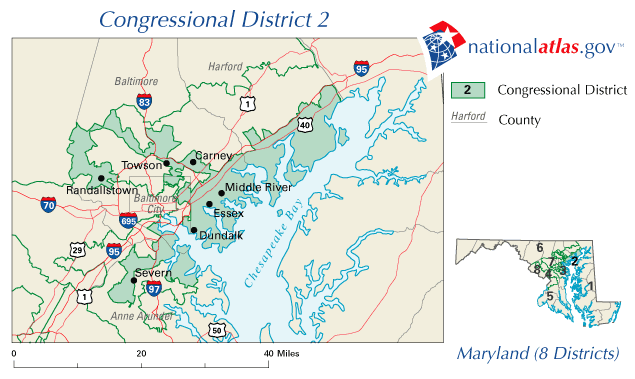

=== Predictions ===
Source	Ranking	As of
Sabato's Crystal Ball	Lean D (flip)	November 4, 2002
New York Times	Tossup	October 14, 2002

=== Results ===
Marylands's 2nd congressional district election, 2002
Party	Candidate	Votes	%
Democratic	Dutch Ruppersberger	105,718	54.31
Republican	Helen Delich Bentley	88,954	45.69
Total votes		194,672	100.00
Democratic gain from Republican			

== District 3 ==
2002 Maryland's 3rd congressional district election
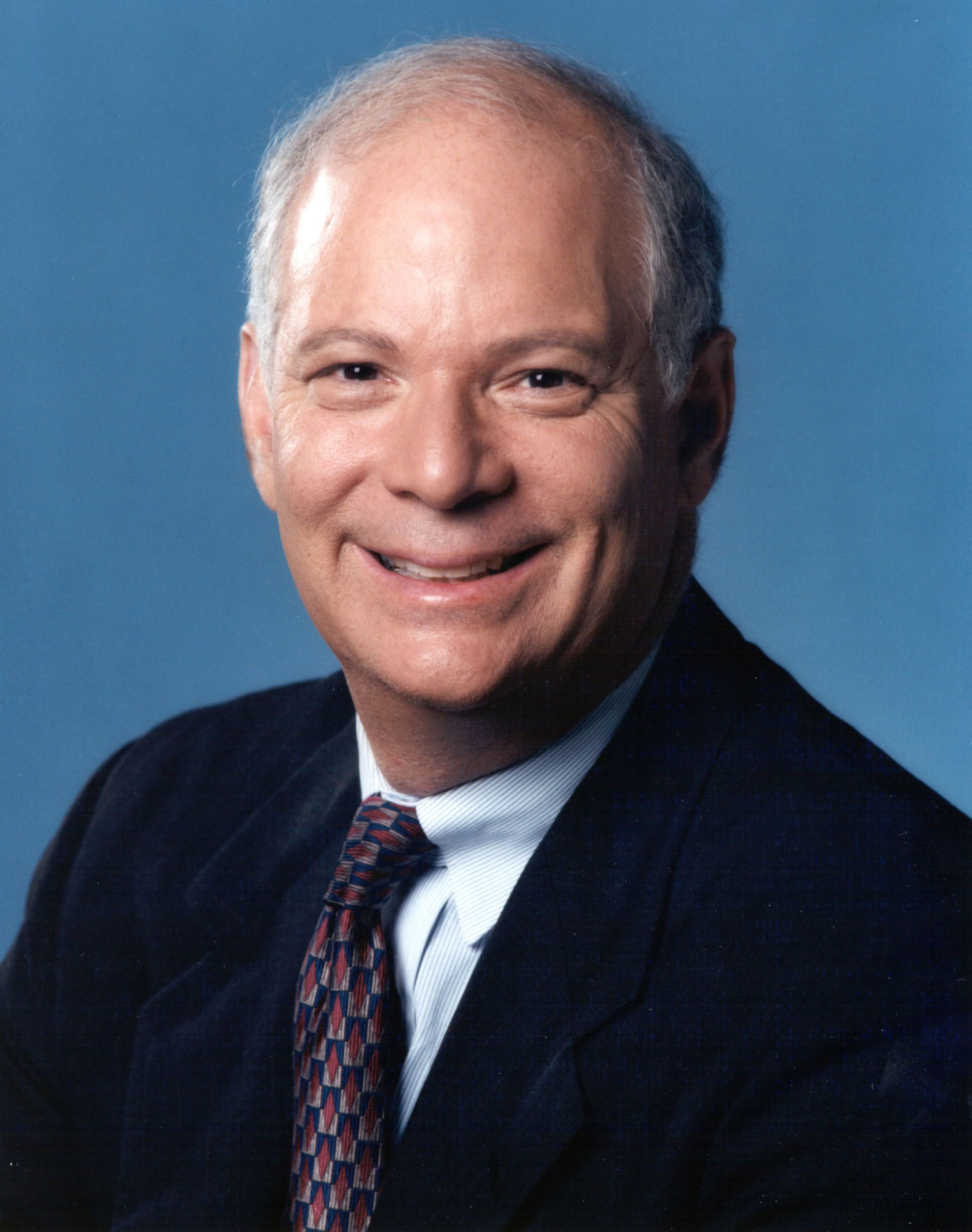

Nominee	Ben Cardin	Scott Conwell
Party	Democratic	Republican
Popular vote	145,589	75,721
Percentage	65.8%	34.2%
- County results Cardin: 50–60% 60–70% 70–80%
U.S. Representative before election
Benjamin Cardin
Democratic
Elected U.S. Representative
Benjamin Cardin
Democratic

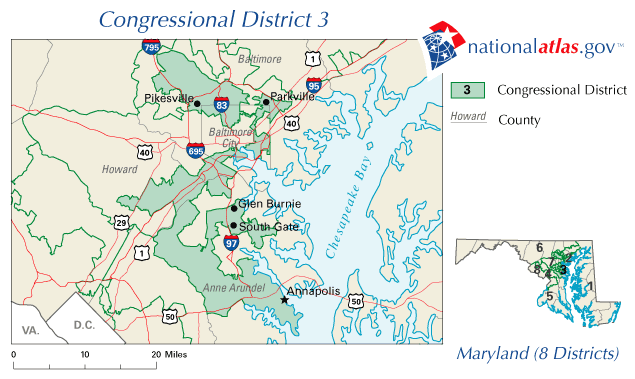

=== Predictions ===
Source	Ranking	As of
Sabato's Crystal Ball	Safe D	November 4, 2002
New York Times	Safe D	October 14, 2002

=== Results ===
Marylands's 3rd congressional district election, 2002
Party	Candidate	Votes	%
Democratic	Benjamin Cardin (inc.)	145,589	65.79
Republican	Scott Conwell	75,721	34.21
Total votes		221,310	100.00
Democratic hold			

== District 4 ==
2002 Maryland's 4th congressional district election

Nominee	Al Wynn	John B. Kimble
Party	Democratic	Republican
Popular vote	131,644	34,890
Percentage	79.0%	20.9%
- County results Wynn: 60–70% 90–100%
U.S. Representative before election
Al Wynn
Democratic
Elected U.S. Representative
Al Wynn
Democratic

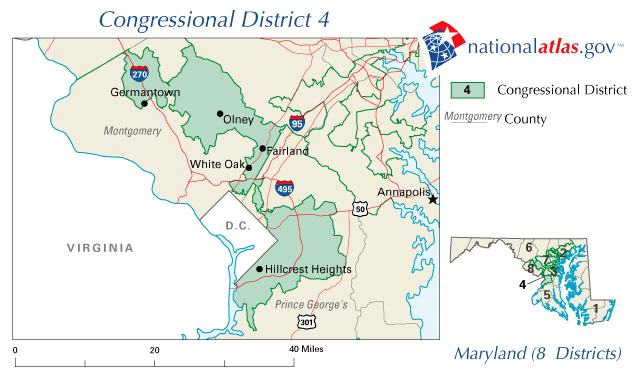

=== Predictions ===
Source	Ranking	As of
Sabato's Crystal Ball	Safe D	November 4, 2002
New York Times	Safe D	October 14, 2002

=== Results ===
Marylands's 4th congressional district election, 2002
Party	Candidate	Votes	%
Democratic	Al Wynn (inc.)	131,644	78.96
Republican	John B. Kimble	34,890	20.93
Write-ins		195	0.12
Total votes		166,729	100.00
Democratic hold			

== District 5 ==
2002 Maryland's 5th congressional district election

Nominee	Steny Hoyer	Joseph T. Crawford
Party	Democratic	Republican
Popular vote	137,903	60,758
Percentage	69.4%	30.6%
- County results Hoyer: 50–60% 60–70% 70–80%
U.S. Representative before election
Steny Hoyer
Democratic
Elected U.S. Representative
Steny Hoyer
Democratic

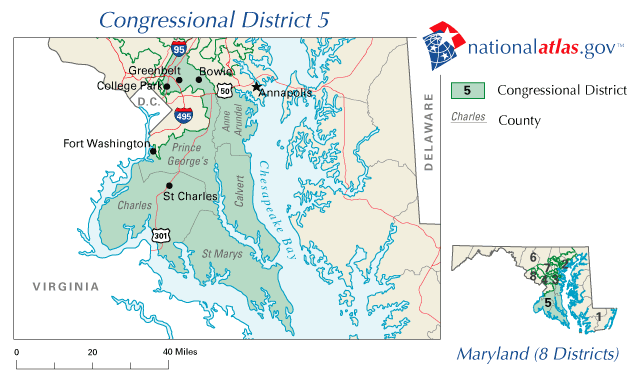

=== Predictions ===
Source	Ranking	As of
Sabato's Crystal Ball	Safe D	November 4, 2002
New York Times	Safe D	October 14, 2002

=== Results ===
Marylands's 5th congressional district election, 2002
Party	Candidate	Votes	%
Democratic	Steny Hoyer (inc.)	137,903	69.36
Republican	Joseph T. Crawford	60,758	30.56
Green	Bob S. Auerbach (write-in)	158	0.08
Total votes		198,819	100.00
Democratic hold			

== District 6 ==
2002 Maryland's 6th congressional district election
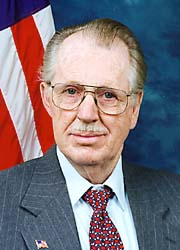

Nominee	Roscoe Bartlett	Donald M. DeArmon
Party	Republican	Democratic
Popular vote	147,825	75,575
Percentage	66.2%	33.8%
- County results Bartlett: 50–60% 60–70% 70–80%
U.S. Representative before election
Roscoe Bartlett
Republican
Elected U.S. Representative
Roscoe Bartlett
Republican

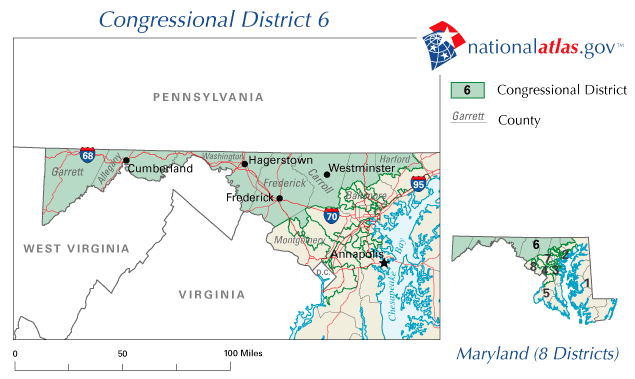

=== Predictions ===
Source	Ranking	As of
Sabato's Crystal Ball	Safe R	November 4, 2002
New York Times	Safe R	October 14, 2002

=== Results ===
Marylands's 6th congressional district election, 2002
Party	Candidate	Votes	%
Republican	Roscoe Bartlett (inc.)	147,825	66.17
Democratic	Donald M. DeArmon	75,575	33.83
Total votes		223,400	100.00
Republican hold			

== District 7 ==
2002 Maryland's 7th congressional district election

Nominee	Elijah Cummings	Joseph E. Ward
Party	Democratic	Republican
Popular vote	137,047	49,172
Percentage	73.6%	26.4%
- County results Cummings: 50–60% 70–80% 90–100%
U.S. Representative before election
Elijah Cummings
Democratic
Elected U.S. Representative
Elijah Cummings
Democratic

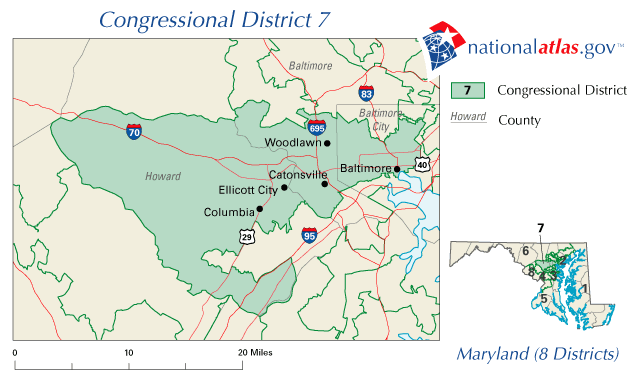

=== Predictions ===
Source	Ranking	As of
Sabato's Crystal Ball	Safe D	November 4, 2002
New York Times	Safe D	October 14, 2002

=== Results ===
Marylands's 7th congressional district election, 2002
Party	Candidate	Votes	%
Democratic	Elijah Cummings (inc.)	137,047	73.59
Republican	Joseph E. Ward	49,172	26.41
Total votes		186,219	100.00
Democratic hold			

== District 8 ==
2002 Maryland's 8th congressional district election

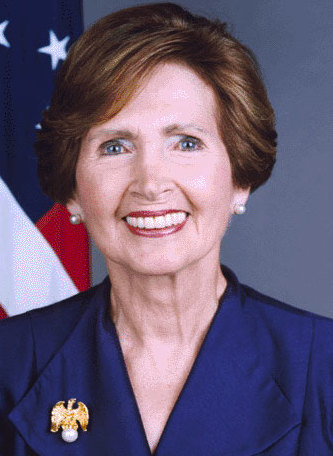
Nominee	Chris Van Hollen	Connie Morella
Party	Democratic	Republican
Popular vote	112,788	103,587
Percentage	51.7%	47.5%
- County results Hollen: 50–60% 70–80%
U.S. Representative before election
Connie Morella
Republican
Elected U.S. Representative
Chris Van Hollen
Democratic

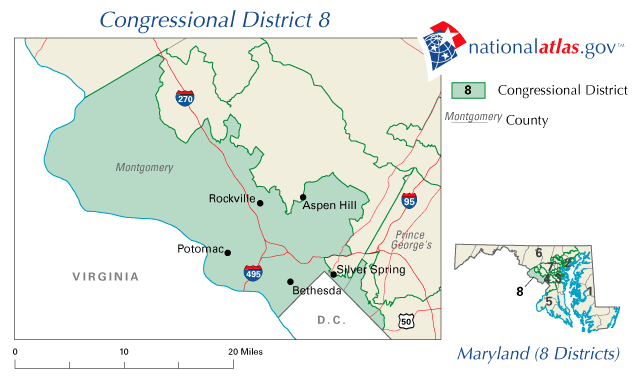

=== Predictions ===
Source	Ranking	As of
Sabato's Crystal Ball	Lean D (flip)	November 4, 2002
New York Times	Tossup	October 14, 2002

=== Results ===
Marylands's 8th congressional district election, 2002
Party	Candidate	Votes	%
Democratic	Chris Van Hollen	112,788	51.74
Republican	Connie Morella (inc.)	103,587	47.52
Write-ins		1,599	0.73
Total votes		217,974	100.00
Democratic gain from Republican			

List of Connie Morella endorsements
- Former Senators Charles Mathias
- Former Representative Gilbert Gude

== See also ==
Preceded by 2000 elections	United States House elections in Maryland; 2002	Succeeded by 2004 elections
