= 2004 United States House of Representatives elections in Maryland =

- November 2, 2004

All 8 Maryland seats to the United States House of Representatives
	Majority party	Minority party
Party	Democratic	Republican
Seats before	6	2
Seats won	6	2
Seat change	Steady	Steady
Popular vote	1,310,791	896,232
Percentage	58.17%	39.77%
Swing	▲3.67%	▼5.61%

Democratic
50–60%
60–70%
70–80%
80–90%
Republican
50–60%
60–70%
70–80%
80–90%

The Maryland Congressional elections of 2004 were held on Tuesday, November 2, 2004. The terms of all eight Representatives to the United States House of Representatives expired on January 3, 2005, and therefore all were put up for contest. The winning candidates served a two-year term from January 3, 2005, to January 3, 2007.

== Overview ==
United States House of Representatives elections in Maryland, 2004
Party	Votes	Percentage	+/–	Seats	+/–
Democratic	1,310,791	58.17%	+3.67%	6	—
Republican	896,232	39.77%	-5.61%	2	—
Green	44,563	1.98%	+1.97%	0	—
Constitution	1,849	0.08%	+0.08%	0	—
Others	85	<0.01%	-0.11%	0	—
Totals	2,253,520	100.00%	-	8	—

== District 1 ==
2004 Maryland's 1st congressional district election
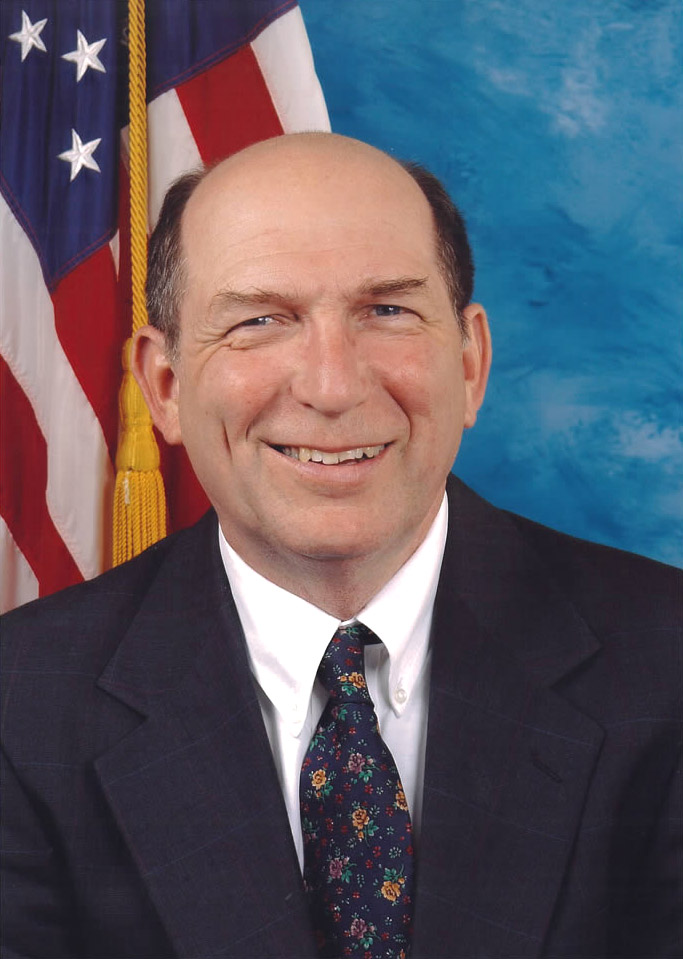

Nominee	Wayne Gilchrest	Kostas Alexakis
Party	Republican	Democratic
Popular vote	245,149	77,872
Percentage	75.9%	24.1%
- County results Gilchrest: 70–80% 80–90%
U.S. Representative before election
Wayne Gilchrest (inc.)
Republican
Elected U.S. Representative
Wayne Gilchrest
Republican

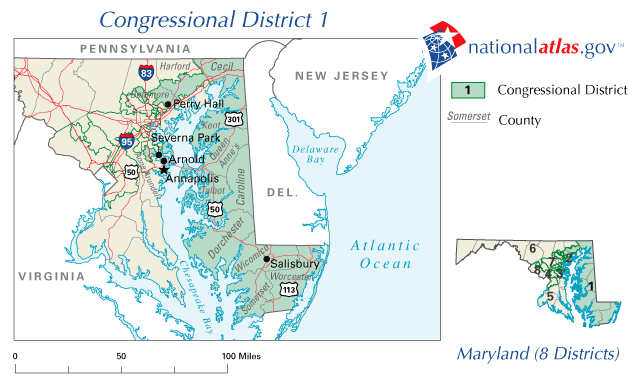

=== Predictions ===
Source	Ranking	As of
The Cook Political Report	Safe R	October 29, 2004
Sabato's Crystal Ball	Safe R	November 1, 2004

=== Results ===
2004 Maryland's 1st congressional district election
Party	Candidate	Votes	%	±%
Republican	Wayne Gilchrest (inc.)	245,149	75.89%	−0.94
Democratic	Kostas Alexakis	77,872	24.11%	+0.91
Total votes		323,021	100.00	
Republican hold				

== District 2 ==
2004 Maryland's 2nd congressional district election
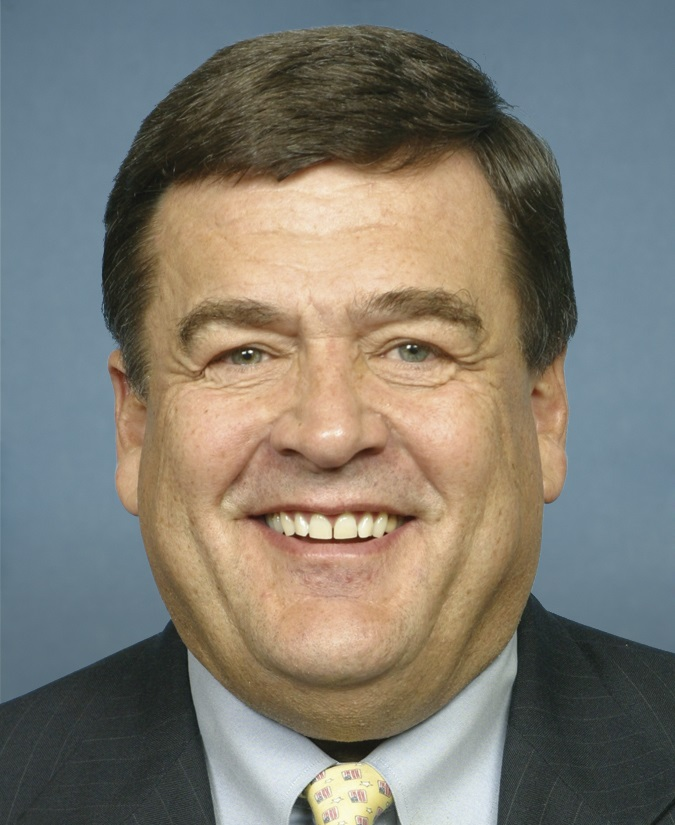

Nominee	Dutch Ruppersberger	Jane Brooks
Party	Democratic	Republican
Popular vote	164,751	75,812
Percentage	66.7%	30.7%
- County results Ruppersberger: 50–60% 60–70% 80–90%
U.S. Representative before election
Dutch Ruppersberger (inc.)
Democratic
Elected U.S. Representative
Dutch Ruppersberger
Democratic

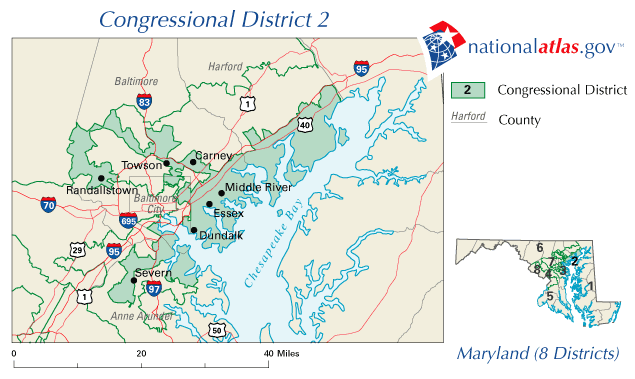

=== Predictions ===
Source	Ranking	As of
The Cook Political Report	Safe D	October 29, 2004
Sabato's Crystal Ball	Safe D	November 1, 2004

=== Results ===
2004 Maryland's 2nd congressional district election
Party	Candidate	Votes	%	±%
Democratic	Dutch Ruppersberger (inc.)	164,751	66.68%	+12.37
Republican	Jane Brooks	75,812	30.68%	−15.01
Green	Keith Salkowski	6,508	2.63%	+2.63
Total votes		247,071	100.00	
Democratic hold				

== District 3 ==
2004 Maryland's 3rd congressional district election
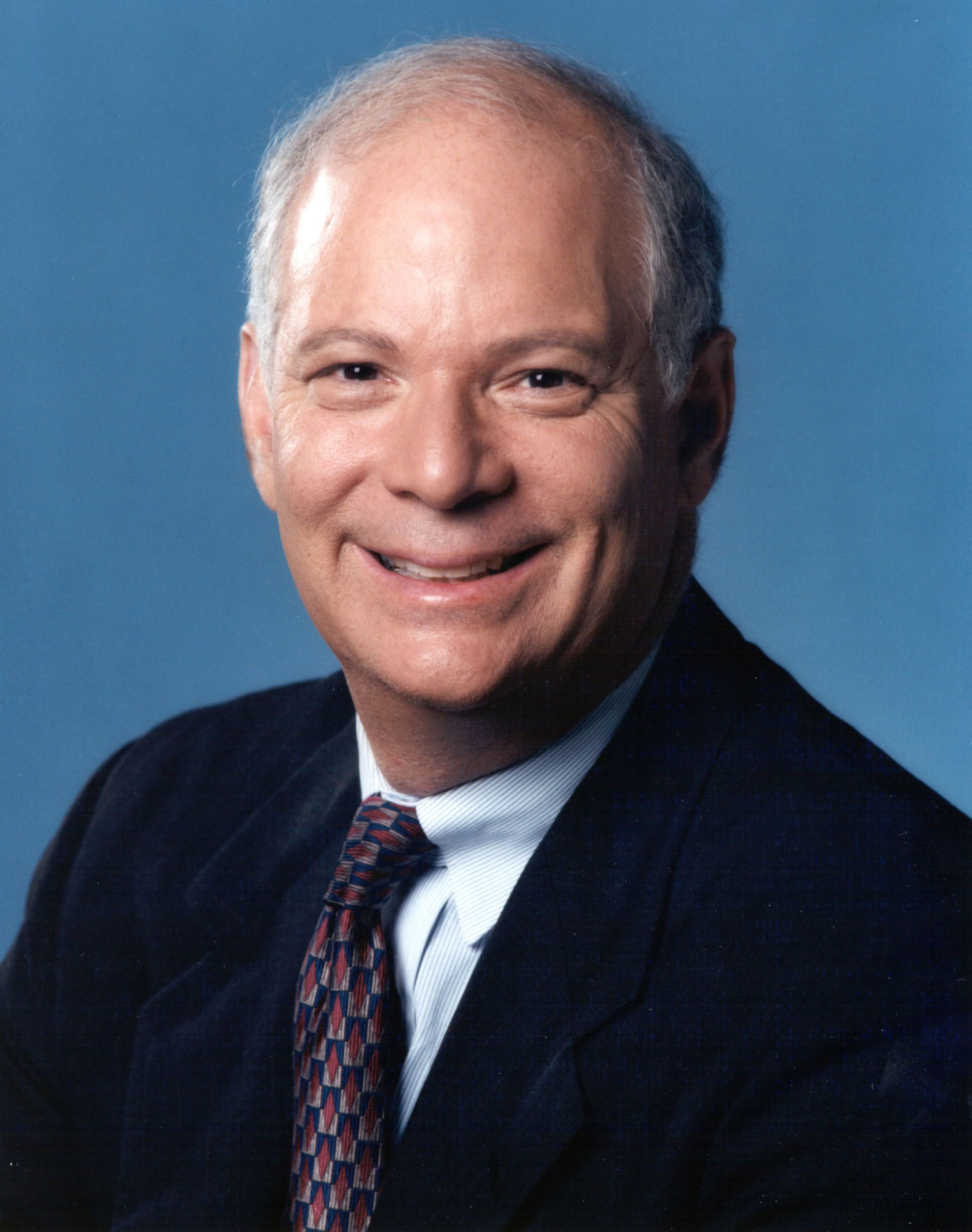

Nominee	Benjamin Cardin	Robert P. Duckworth
Party	Democratic	Republican
Popular vote	182,066	97,008
Percentage	63.4%	33.8%
- County results Cardin: 40–50% 60–70% 70–80%
U.S. Representative before election
Benjamin Cardin (inc.)
Democratic
Elected U.S. Representative
Benjamin Cardin
Democratic

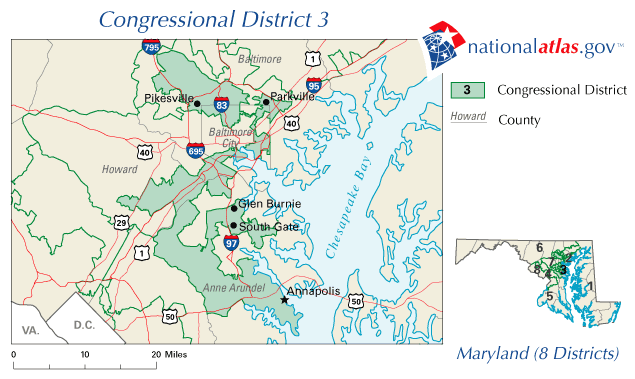

=== Predictions ===
Source	Ranking	As of
The Cook Political Report	Safe D	October 29, 2004
Sabato's Crystal Ball	Safe D	November 1, 2004

=== Results ===
2004 Maryland's 3rd congressional district election
Party	Candidate	Votes	%	±%
Democratic	Benjamin Cardin (inc.)	182,066	63.44%	−2.35
Republican	Robert P. Duckworth	97,008	33.80%	−0.41
Green	Patsy Allen	7,895	2.75%	+2.75
Total votes		286,969	100.00	
Democratic hold				

== District 4 ==
2004 Maryland's 4th congressional district election

Nominee	Al Wynn	John McKinnis
Party	Democratic	Republican
Popular vote	196,809	52,907
Percentage	75.2%	20.2%
- County results Wynn: 50–60% 80–90%
U.S. Representative before election
Al Wynn (inc.)
Democratic
Elected U.S. Representative
Al Wynn
Democratic

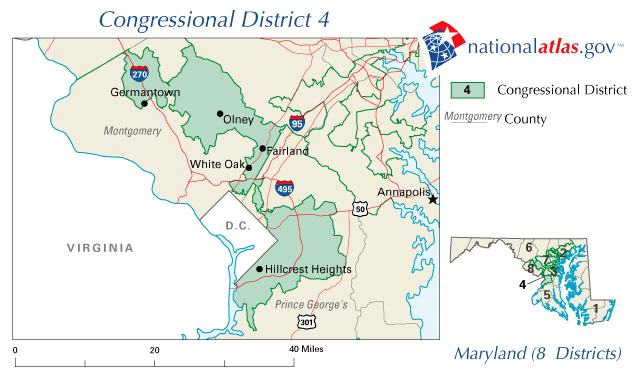

=== Predictions ===
Source	Ranking	As of
The Cook Political Report	Safe D	October 29, 2004
Sabato's Crystal Ball	Safe D	November 1, 2004

=== Results ===
2004 Maryland's 4th congressional district election
Party	Candidate	Votes	%	±%
Democratic	Al Wynn (inc.)	196,809	75.23%	−3.73
Republican	John McKinnis	52,907	20.22%	−0.71
Green	Theresa Mitchell Dudley	11,885	4.54%	+4.54
Write-ins		6	<0.01%	
Total votes		261,607	100.00	
Democratic hold				

== District 5 ==
2004 Maryland's 5th congressional district election

Nominee	Steny Hoyer	Brad Jewitt
Party	Democratic	Republican
Popular vote	204,867	87,189
Percentage	68.7%	29.3%
- County results Hoyer: 50–60% 60–70% 70–80%
U.S. Representative before election
Steny Hoyer (inc.)
Democratic
Elected U.S. Representative
Steny Hoyer
Democratic

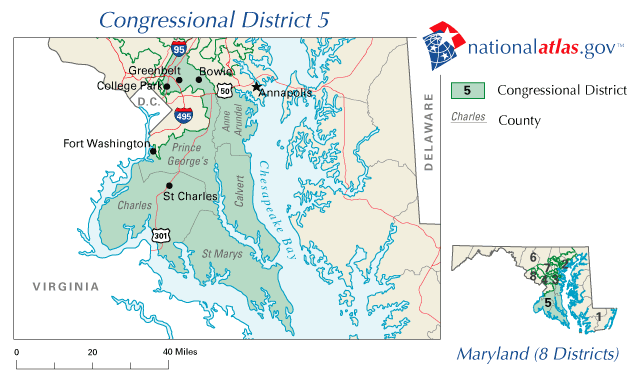

=== Predictions ===
Source	Ranking	As of
The Cook Political Report	Safe D	October 29, 2004
Sabato's Crystal Ball	Safe D	November 1, 2004

=== Results ===
2004 Maryland's 5th congressional district election
Party	Candidate	Votes	%	±%
Democratic	Steny Hoyer (inc.)	204,867	68.72%	−0.64
Republican	Brad Jewitt	87,189	29.25%	−1.31
Green	Bob S. Auerbach	4,224	1.42%	+1.34
Constitution	Steve Krukar	1,849	0.62%	+0.62
Total votes		298,129	100.00	
Democratic hold				

== District 6 ==
2004 Maryland's 6th congressional district election
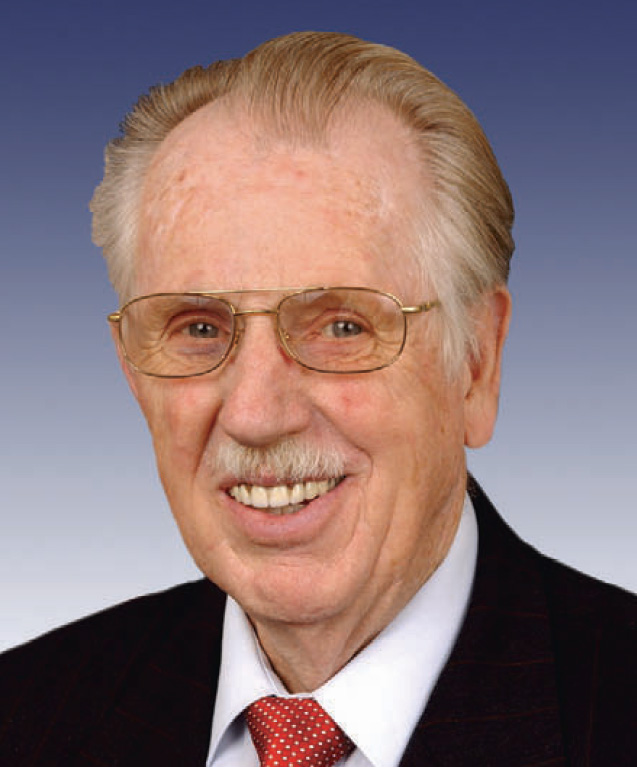

Nominee	Roscoe Bartlett	Kenneth T. Bosley
Party	Republican	Democratic
Popular vote	206,076	90,108
Percentage	67.5%	29.5%
- County results Bartlett: 50–60% 60–70% 70–80%
U.S. Representative before election
Roscoe Bartlett (inc.)
Republican
Elected U.S. Representative
Roscoe Bartlett
Republican

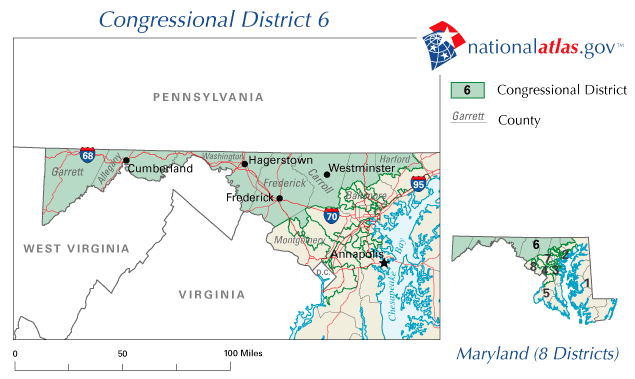

=== Predictions ===
Source	Ranking	As of
The Cook Political Report	Safe R	October 29, 2004
Sabato's Crystal Ball	Safe R	November 1, 2004

=== Results ===
2004 Maryland's 6th congressional district election
Party	Candidate	Votes	%	±%
Republican	Roscoe Bartlett (inc.)	206,076	67.45%	+1.28
Democratic	Kenneth T. Bosley	90,108	29.49%	−4.34
Green	Gregory J. Hemingway	9,324	3.05%	+3.05
Total votes		305,508	100.00	
Republican hold				

== District 7 ==
2004 Maryland's 7th congressional district election
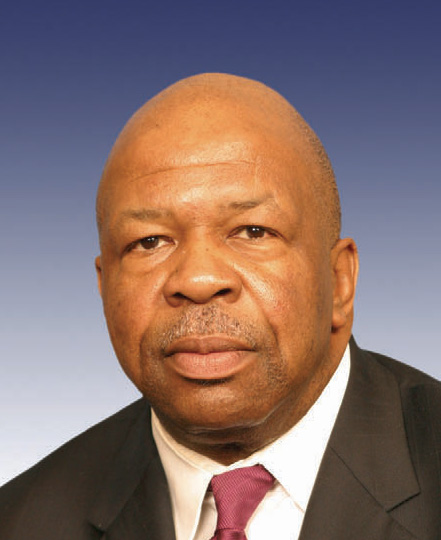

Nominee	Elijah Cummings	Tony Salazar
Party	Democratic	Republican
Popular vote	179,189	60,102
Percentage	73.4%	24.6%
- County results Cummings: 50–60% 70–80% 90–100%
U.S. Representative before election
Elijah Cummings (inc.)
Democratic
Elected U.S. Representative
Elijah Cummings
Democratic

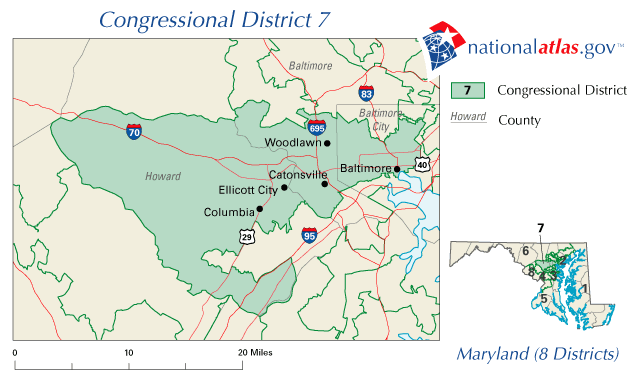

=== Predictions ===
Source	Ranking	As of
The Cook Political Report	Safe D	October 29, 2004
Sabato's Crystal Ball	Safe D	November 1, 2004

=== Results ===
2004 Maryland's 7th congressional district election
Party	Candidate	Votes	%	±%
Democratic	Elijah Cummings (inc.)	179,189	73.43%	−0.16
Republican	Tony Salazar	60,102	24.63%	−1.78
Green	Virginia T. Rodino	4,727	1.94%	+1.94
Total votes		244,018	100.00	
Democratic hold				

== District 8 ==
2004 Maryland's 8th congressional district election

Nominee	Chris Van Hollen	Chuck Floyd
Party	Democratic	Republican
Popular vote	215,129	71,989
Percentage	74.9%	25.1%
- County results Hollen: 70–80% 90–100%
U.S. Representative before election
Chris Van Hollen (inc.)
Democratic
Elected U.S. Representative
Chris Van Hollen
Democratic

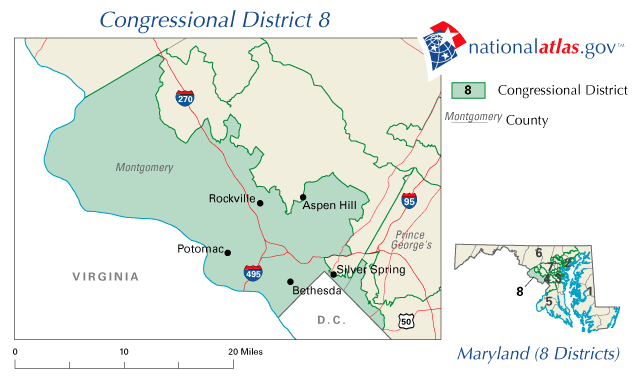

=== Predictions ===
Source	Ranking	As of
The Cook Political Report	Safe D	October 29, 2004
Sabato's Crystal Ball	Safe D	November 1, 2004

=== Results ===
2004 Maryland's 8th congressional district election
Party	Candidate	Votes	%	±%
Democratic	Chris Van Hollen (inc.)	215,129	74.91%	+23.17
Republican	Chuck Floyd	71,989	25.07%	−22.45
Write-ins		79	0.03%	
Total votes		287,197	100.00	
Democratic hold				

== See also ==
Preceded by 2002 elections	United States House elections in Maryland; 2004	Succeeded by 2006 elections
