= 2006 United States House of Representatives elections in Maryland =

- November 7, 2006

All 8 Maryland seats to the United States House of Representatives
	Majority party	Minority party
Party	Democratic	Republican
Last election	6	2
Seats won	6	2
Seat change	Steady	Steady
Popular vote	1,099,441	546,862
Percentage	64.63%	32.15%
Swing	▲6.46%	▼7.62%

Democratic
50–60%
60–70%
70–80%
80–90%
90–100%
Republican
50–60%
60–70%
70–80%

The Maryland congressional elections of 2006 were held on Tuesday, November 7, 2006. The terms of all eight representatives to the United States House of Representatives expired on January 3, 2007, and therefore all were put up for contest. The winning candidates served a two-year term from January 3, 2007, to January 3, 2009.

== Overview ==
United States House of Representatives elections in Maryland, 2006
Party	Votes	Percentage	+/–	Seats	+/–
Democratic	1,099,441	64.63%	+6.46%	6	—
Republican	546,862	32.15%	-7.62%	2	—
Green	42,857	2.52%	+0.54%	0	—
Libertarian	4,941	0.29%	+0.29%	0	—
Constitution	635	0.04%	-0.04%	0	—
Others	6,466	0.38%	+0.38%	0	—
Totals	1,701,202	100.00%	-	8	—

== District 1 ==
2006 Maryland's 1st congressional district election
- November 7, 2006
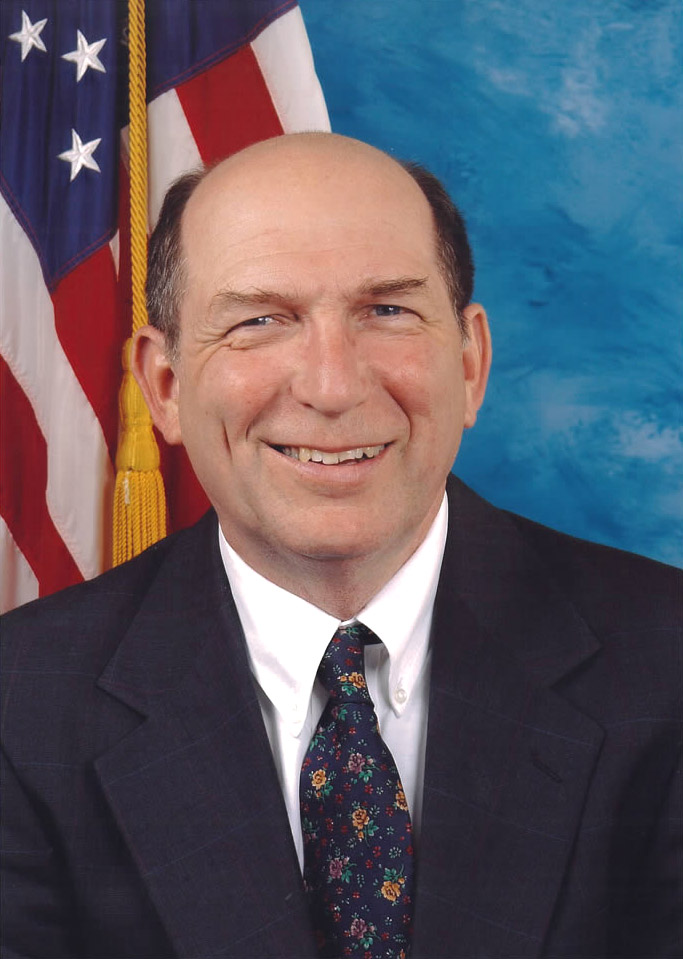

Nominee	Wayne T. Gilchrest	Jim Corwin
Party	Republican	Democratic
Popular vote	185,177	83,738
Percentage	68.8%	31.1%
U.S. Representative before election
Wayne Gilchrest (inc.)
Republican
Elected U.S. Representative
Wayne T. Gilchrest
Republican

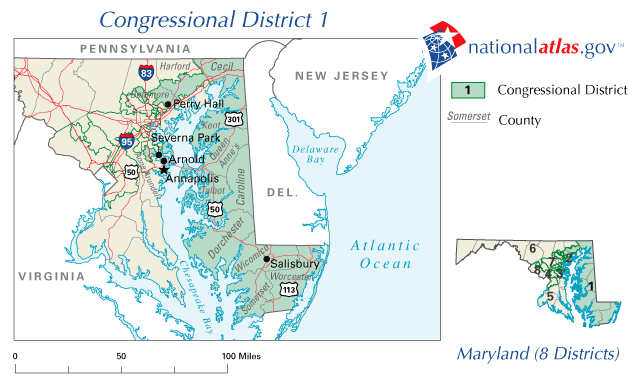

United States Representative Incumbent Wayne Gilchrest, seeking his 9th term in Congress, faced Jim Corwin, the Democratic nominee and a family physician. Gilchrest's reputation as a moderate Republican built up his popularity and he was overwhelmingly re-elected in this conservative, Eastern Shore-based district.

=== Predictions ===
Source	Ranking	As of
The Cook Political Report	Safe R	November 6, 2006
Rothenberg	Safe R	November 6, 2006
Sabato's Crystal Ball	Safe R	November 6, 2006
Real Clear Politics	Safe R	November 7, 2006
CQ Politics	Safe R	November 7, 2006

Marylands's 1st congressional district election, 2006
Party	Candidate	Votes	%	±%
Republican	Wayne Gilchrest (inc.)	185,177	68.80%	−7.09
Democratic	Jim Corwin	83,738	31.11%	+7.00
Write-ins		232	0.09%	
Total votes		269,147	100.00	
Republican hold				

== District 2 ==
2006 Maryland's 2nd congressional district election
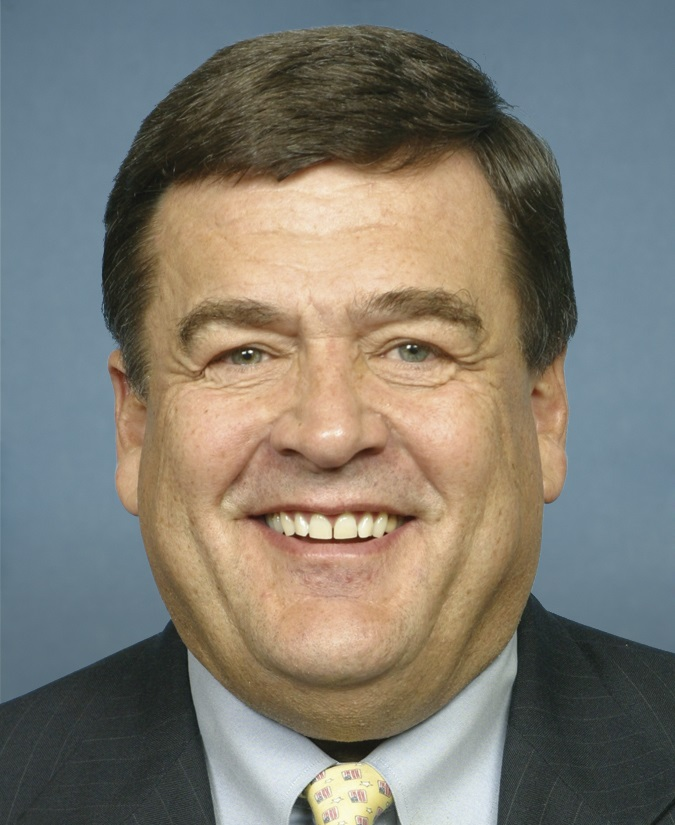

Nominee	Dutch Ruppersberger	Jimmy Mathis
Party	Democratic	Republican
Popular vote	135,818	60,195
Percentage	69.2%	30.7%
- County results Ruppersberger: 60–70% 80–90%
U.S. Representative before election
Dutch Ruppersberger (inc.)
Democratic
Elected U.S. Representative
Dutch Ruppersberger
Democratic

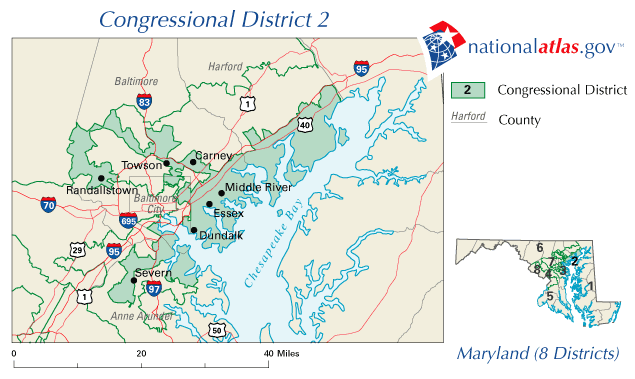

In this heavily gerrymandered and relatively liberal district, incumbent Democratic Congressman Dutch Ruppersberger faced no serious threat from Republican candidate Jimmy Mathis. Ruppersberger won a third term in this district that includes small parts of Baltimore and some of the Baltimore metropolitan area in a landslide.

=== Predictions ===
Source	Ranking	As of
The Cook Political Report	Safe D	November 6, 2006
Rothenberg	Safe D	November 6, 2006
Sabato's Crystal Ball	Safe D	November 6, 2006
Real Clear Politics	Safe D	November 7, 2006
CQ Politics	Safe D	November 7, 2006

Marylands's 2nd congressional district election, 2006
Party	Candidate	Votes	%	±%
Democratic	Dutch Ruppersberger (inc.)	135,818	69.21%	+2.53
Republican	Jimmy Mathis	60,195	30.68%	−
Write-ins		215	0.11%	
Total votes		196,228	100.00	
Democratic hold				

== District 3 ==
2006 Maryland's 3rd congressional district election
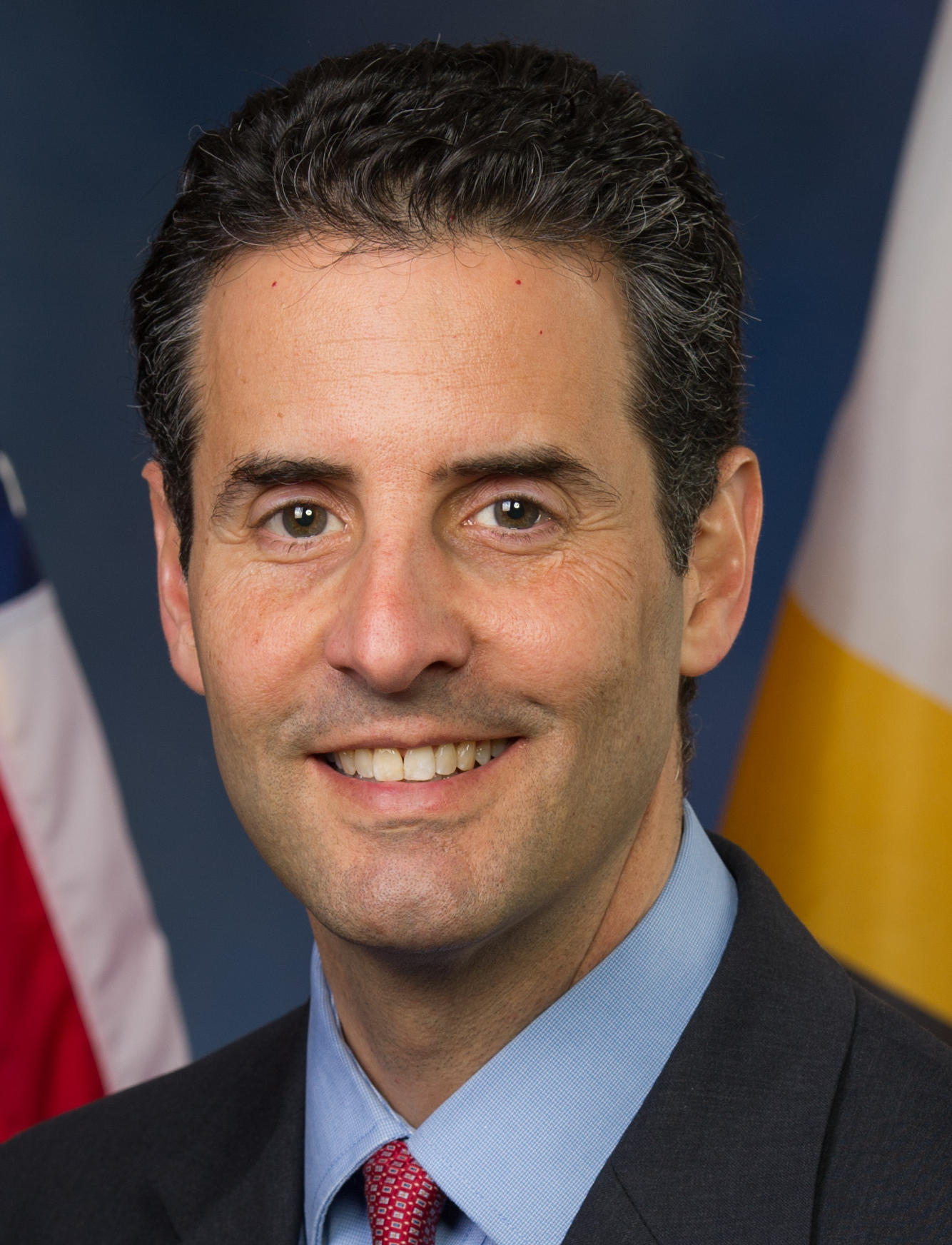

Nominee	John Sarbanes	John White
Party	Democratic	Republican
Popular vote	150,142	79,174
Percentage	64.0%	33.8%
- County results Sarbanes: 50–60% 60–70% 70–80%
U.S. Representative before election
Ben Cardin
Democratic
Elected U.S. Representative
John Sarbanes
Democratic

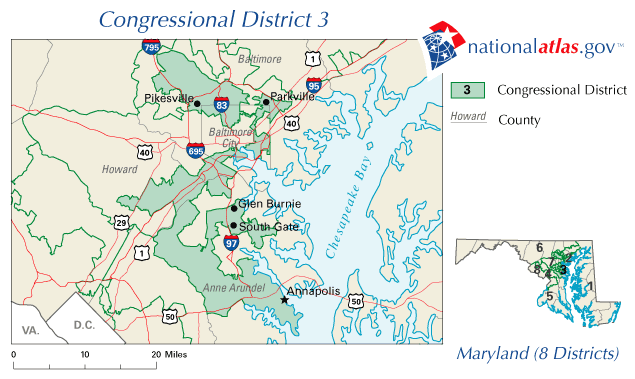

Incumbent Democratic Congressman Ben Cardin declined to seek an eleventh term so that he could run for Senate. John Sarbanes, the son of retiring Senator Paul Sarbanes and an attorney, won a crowded Democratic primary and became the Democratic nominee. Annapolis marketing executive John White was the Republican nominee, and, true to the liberal nature of this district based in the Baltimore metropolitan area, Sarbanes beat White.

=== Predictions ===
Source	Ranking	As of
The Cook Political Report	Safe D	November 6, 2006
Rothenberg	Safe D	November 6, 2006
Sabato's Crystal Ball	Safe D	November 6, 2006
Real Clear Politics	Safe D	November 7, 2006
CQ Politics	Likely D	November 7, 2006

Marylands's 3rd congressional district election, 2006
Party	Candidate	Votes	%	±%
Democratic	John Sarbanes	150,142	64.03%	+0.59
Republican	John White	79,174	33.76%	−0.04
Libertarian	Charles Curtis McPeek, Sr.	4,941	2.11%	+2.11
Write-ins		229	0.10%	
Total votes		234,486	100.00	
Democratic hold				

== District 4 ==
2006 Maryland's 4th congressional district election

Nominee	Al Wynn	Michael Moshe Starkman
Party	Democratic	Republican
Popular vote	141,897	32,792
Percentage	80.7%	18.6%
- County results Wynn: 60–70% 90–100%
U.S. Representative before election
Al Wynn (inc.)
Democratic
Elected U.S. Representative
Al Wynn
Democratic

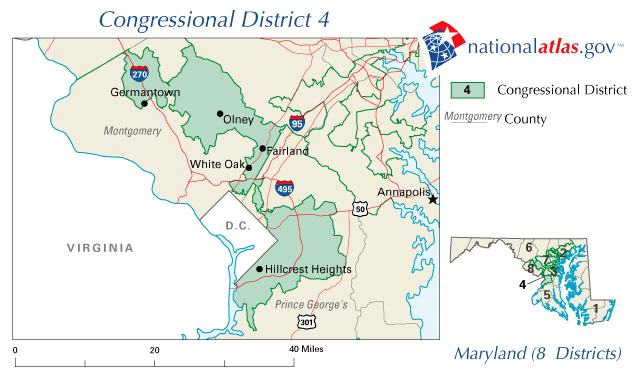

In this district, which has a majority African-American population and is based in Prince George's County and Montgomery County, is heavily liberal. Incumbent Democratic Congressman Al Wynn survived a tough primary challenge from lawyer Donna Edwards, and since the Democratic primary is tantamount to election, Wynn was the heavy favorite to win the general election, which he ultimately did.

=== Predictions ===
Source	Ranking	As of
The Cook Political Report	Safe D	November 6, 2006
Rothenberg	Safe D	November 6, 2006
Sabato's Crystal Ball	Safe D	November 6, 2006
Real Clear Politics	Safe D	November 7, 2006
CQ Politics	Safe D	November 7, 2006

Marylands's 4th congressional district election, 2006
Party	Candidate	Votes	%	±%
Democratic	Al Wynn (inc.)	141,897	80.67%	+5.44
Republican	Michael Moshe Starkman	32,792	18.64%	−1.58
Write-ins		1,214	0.69%	
Total votes		175,903	100.00	
Democratic hold				

== District 5 ==
2006 Maryland's 5th congressional district election

Nominee	Steny Hoyer	Steve Warner
Party	Democratic	Green
Popular vote	168,114	33,464
Percentage	82.7%	16.5%
- County results Hoyer: 60–70% 70–80% 80–90%
U.S. Representative before election
Steny Hoyer (inc.)
Democratic
Elected U.S. Representative
Steny Hoyer
Democratic

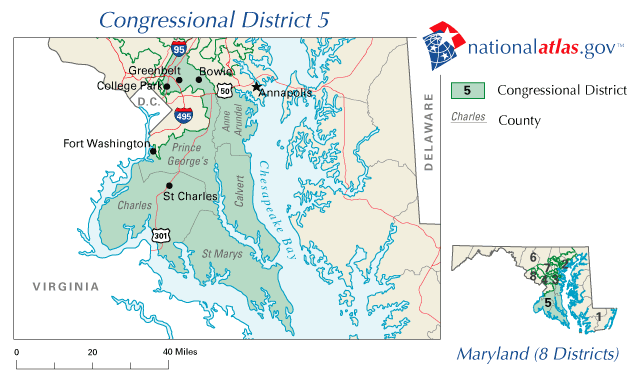

House Minority Whip Steny Hoyer, who has served in Congress since he was elected in a 1981 special election to fill the seat previously held by Gladys Spellman, did not face a Republican opponent in this election. Hoyer's election to his fourteenth term was never in doubt, however, seeing as this district, based in the Washington, D.C. metropolitan area and southern Maryland, is heavily liberal. Hoyer beat out Green Party candidate Steve Warner and Constitution Party candidate Peter Kuhnert to win another term in Congress.

=== Predictions ===
Source	Ranking	As of
The Cook Political Report	Safe D	November 6, 2006
Rothenberg	Safe D	November 6, 2006
Sabato's Crystal Ball	Safe D	November 6, 2006
Real Clear Politics	Safe D	November 7, 2006
CQ Politics	Safe D	November 7, 2006

Marylands's 5th congressional district election, 2006
Party	Candidate	Votes	%	±%
Democratic	Steny Hoyer (inc.)	168,114	82.68%	+13.96
Green	Steve Warner	33,464	16.46%	+15.04
Constitution	Peter Kuhnert	635	0.31%	−0.31
Write-ins		1,110	0.55%	
Total votes		203,323	100.00	
Democratic hold				

== District 6 ==
2006 Maryland's 6th congressional district election
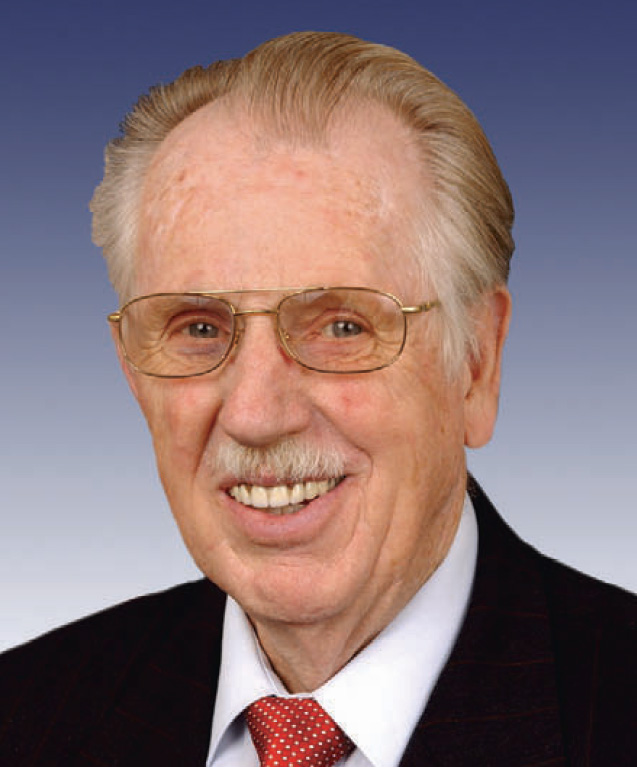

Nominee	Roscoe Bartlett	Andrew J. Duck
Party	Republican	Democratic
Popular vote	141,200	92,030
Percentage	59.0%	38.4%
- County results Bartlett: 50–60% 60–70%
U.S. Representative before election
Roscoe Bartlett (inc.)
Republican
Elected U.S. Representative
Roscoe Bartlett
Republican

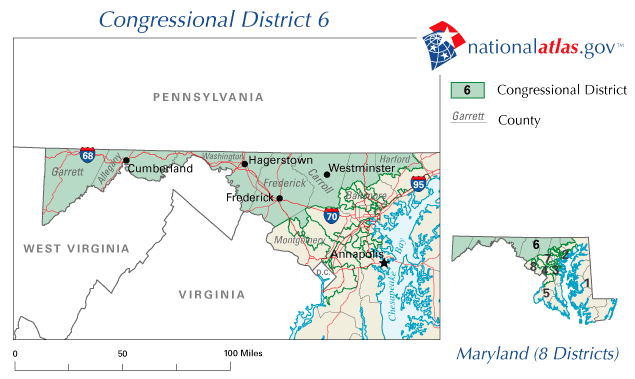

This district, based in the heavily conservative Maryland panhandle and the moderately conservative northern suburbs of Baltimore, has sent incumbent Republican Congressman Roscoe Bartlett back to Washington with solid margins of re-election, and this year proved no different. Congressman Bartlett faced United States Army veteran Andrew J. Duck in the general election, and though he ultimately beat Duck out, it was by a thinner margin than usual.

=== Predictions ===
Source	Ranking	As of
The Cook Political Report	Safe R	November 6, 2006
Rothenberg	Safe R	November 6, 2006
Sabato's Crystal Ball	Safe R	November 6, 2006
Real Clear Politics	Safe R	November 7, 2006
CQ Politics	Likely R	November 7, 2006

Marylands's 6th congressional district election, 2006
Party	Candidate	Votes	%	±%
Republican	Roscoe Bartlett (inc.)	141,200	58.97%	−8.48
Democratic	Andrew J. Duck	92,030	38.43%	+8.94
Green	Robert E. Kozak	6,095	2.55%	−0.50
Write-ins		128	0.05%	
Total votes		239,453	100.00	
Republican hold				

== District 7 ==
2006 Maryland's 7th congressional district election
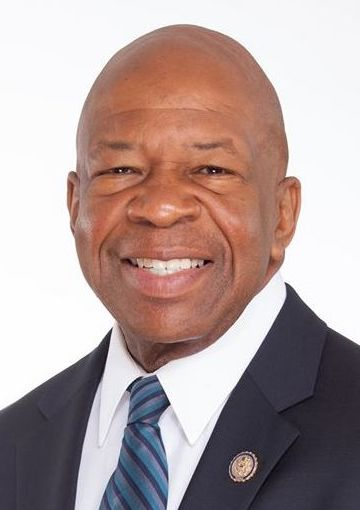
Nominee	Elijah Cummings
Party	Democratic
Popular vote	158,830
Percentage	98.1%
U.S. Representative before election
Elijah Cummings (inc.)
Democratic
Elected U.S. Representative
Elijah Cummings
Democratic

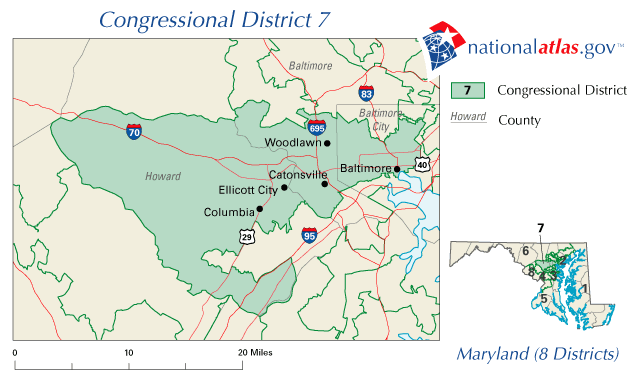

Incumbent Democratic Congressman Elijah Cummings, who has represented this heavily liberal district based in Baltimore, Baltimore County and Howard County since previous Congressman Kweisi Mfume resigned in 1996. This year, the popular Cummings did not face any opponent of any kind in the general election and he coasted to a seventh term.

=== Predictions ===
Source	Ranking	As of
The Cook Political Report	Safe D	November 6, 2006
Rothenberg	Safe D	November 6, 2006
Sabato's Crystal Ball	Safe D	November 6, 2006
Real Clear Politics	Safe D	November 7, 2006
CQ Politics	Safe D	November 7, 2006

Marylands's 7th congressional district election, 2006
Party	Candidate	Votes	%	±%
Democratic	Elijah Cummings (inc.)	158,830	98.06%	+24.63
Write-ins		3,147	1.94%	
Total votes		161,977	100.00	
Democratic hold				

== District 8 ==
2006 Maryland's 8th congressional district election

Nominee	Chris Van Hollen	Jeffrey M. Stein
Party	Democratic	Republican
Popular vote	168,872	48,324
Percentage	76.5%	21.9%
- County results Hollen: 70–80% 90–100%
U.S. Representative before election
Chris Van Hollen (inc.)
Democratic
Elected U.S. Representative
Chris Van Hollen
Democratic

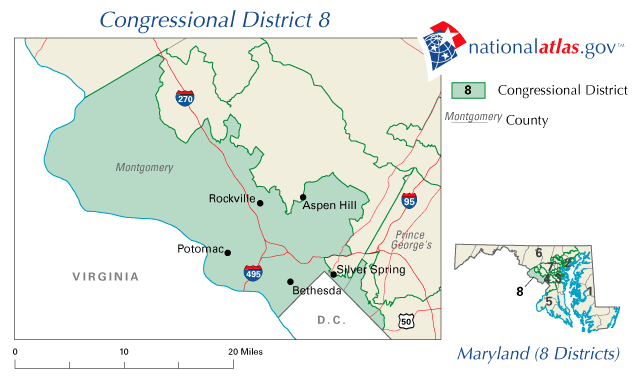

Democratic Congressman Chris Van Hollen has represented this solid Democratic district based in the Washington, D.C. metropolitan area since his initial election in 2002. Van Hollen won by significant margins against Republican Jeffrey Stein and Green Party of the United States candidate Gerard Giblin

=== Predictions ===
Source	Ranking	As of
The Cook Political Report	Safe D	November 6, 2006
Rothenberg	Safe D	November 6, 2006
Sabato's Crystal Ball	Safe D	November 6, 2006
Real Clear Politics	Safe D	November 7, 2006
CQ Politics	Safe D	November 7, 2006

Marylands's 8th congressional district election, 2006
Party	Candidate	Votes	%	±%
Democratic	Chris Van Hollen (inc.)	168,872	76.52%	+1.61
Republican	Jeffrey M. Stein	48,324	21.90%	−3.17
Green	Gerard P. Giblin	3,298	1.49%	+1.49
Write-ins		191	0.09%	
Total votes		220,685	100.00	
Democratic hold				

== See also ==
Preceded by 2004 elections	United States House elections in Maryland; 2006	Succeeded by 2008 elections
