= Samuel Green (freedman) =

African American slave

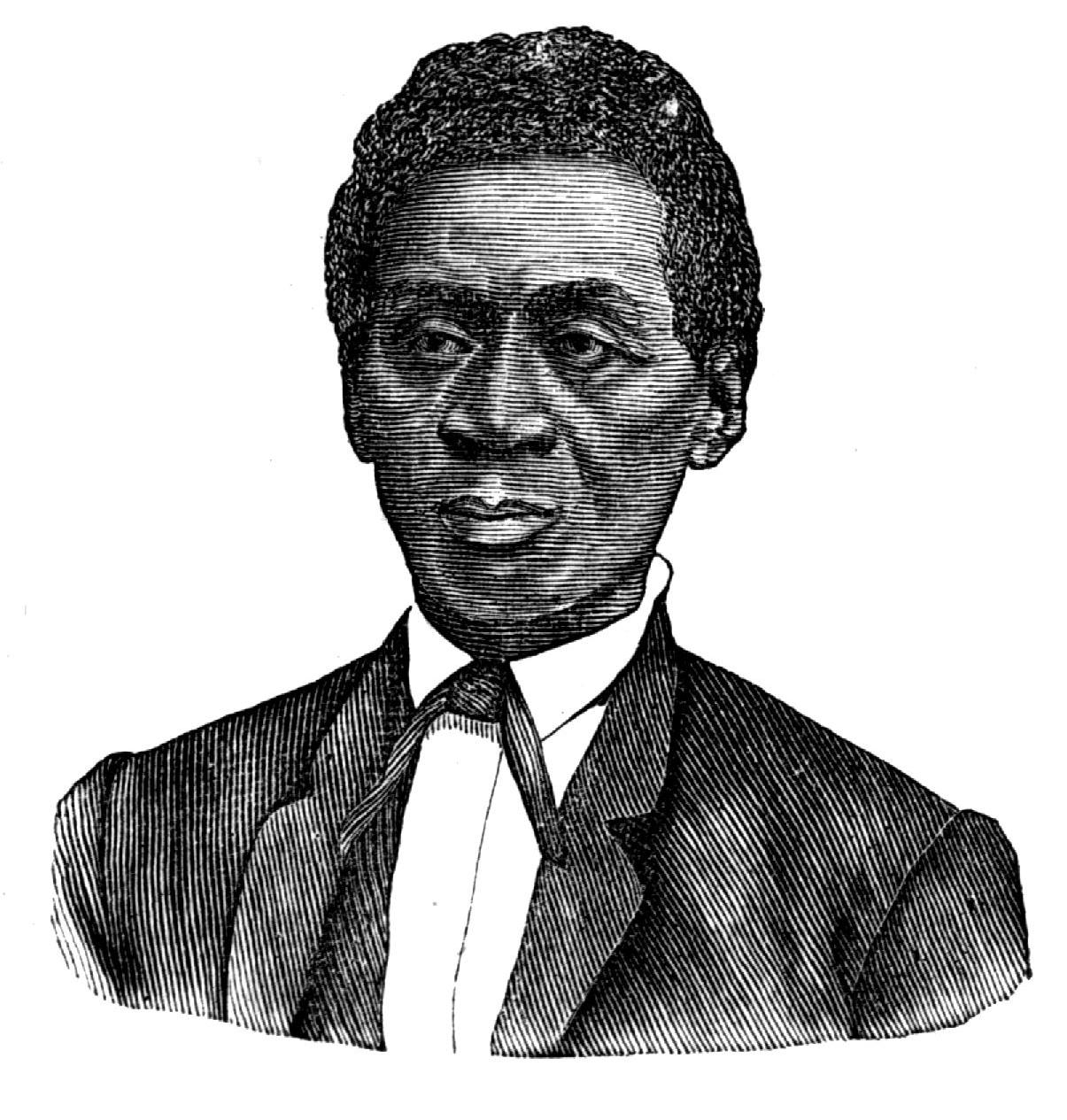
- Born: 1802; East New Market
- Died: 28 February 1877

Samuel Green (c. 1802 – February 28, 1877) was a slave, freedman, and minister of religion. A conductor of the Underground Railroad, he was tried and convicted in 1857 of possessing a copy of the anti-slavery novel Uncle Tom's Cabin by Harriet Beecher Stowe following the Dover Eight incident. He received a ten-year sentence, and was pardoned by the Governor of Maryland Augustus Bradford in 1862, after he served five years.

An African American lay minister, he was a founder and trustee of the Mt. Zion Methodist Church (now Faith United Methodist Church) in New East Market. After the American Civil War, he co-founded and worked at the Centenary Biblical Institute (now Morgan State University). The school taught men to become ministers. The Greens were members of the Orchard Street United Methodist Church in Baltimore.

== Early life ==
Born around 1802 in East New Market, Maryland, little is known about his parents. His father's status is not known, but his mother was enslaved. It is possible that he was related to Harriet "Ritt" Green, the mother of Harriet Tubman.

== Enslaved ==
Green was an enslaved field hand in Dorchester County, Maryland. When his enslaver, Henry Nicholas, died in 1832, a provision in his will provided that Green should be freed after five more years of servitude: (Note: Nichols is also said to have died in 1831.)

It is my will and desire that my negro man Sam Green, be sold for a term of five years and my negro man Daniel for a term of ten years, and to have the liberty to choose Masters, and after the expiration of said terms I do hereby manumit and set them free.

— Henry Nichols, Last Will and Testament

Green became a blacksmith, which allowed him to earn and save money after his work day. After a year of servitude, Green was able to buy off the remaining four years and was freed.

== Marriage and children ==
Green married Catherine (born ca. 1806), who was also called "Kitty", and they had two children, Samuel Jr. born in 1829 and Susan who was born in 1832. His wife and their children were enslaved by Ezekial Richardson. Green was able to buy his wife's freedom in 1842 for $100 (equivalent to $3,336 in 2025). (Note: According to an article in The Liberator on July 4, 1862 stated that he bought his wife for 25 cents. The official record of the purchase states that she was sold for $100.) Green and his wife stayed in the East New Market area.

In the 1830s, Green was deeded land near the Mt. Zion Methodist Church that was built in East New Market in the 1880s. He was among a group of trustees that were deeded land. The Greens lived on Indian Creek, about six miles up Choptank River. Indian Creek is between two and four miles southwest of New East Market. Green was literate and likely taught his children to read and write. He also had a deep faith in Methodism.

Green had tried, but was unsuccessful in purchasing the freedom of his children, Samuel, Jr. was born in 1829 and Susan, also known as Sarah, was born three years later. They were more valuable because they had more work years ahead of them. Their children remained enslaved, but they lived with their parents until 1847 when Richardson sold the children to Dr. James Muse. In 1850, six-year-old Edward Johnson lived with Catherine and Sam Green. A four-year-old girl also lived with the Greens that year.

In 1854, Sam Jr. fled to Canada. Susan married and had two children. She was permanently separated from her family when Muse sold her to a slaveholder in Missouri after Sam Jr. ran away.

== Free blacks in Maryland ==
Maryland had the largest number of free African Americans in the country, with more than half of Maryland's blacks living in Dorchester County in 1860. Former enslaved people were freed by manumission, such as through the wills of their owners. Some were allowed to perform extra work and saved up enough to purchase their freedom. Concerned that free blacks would help enslaved people escape, laws were enacted that limited their civil rights.

== Freedom ==
After Green was freed, he worked as a farmer and as a lay minister or exhorter in the African Methodist Episcopal Church in Dorchester County, Maryland. Rev. Samuel Green was a founder and trustee of the Mt. Zion Methodist Church, now Faith United Methodist Church. Green's reputation grew in stature in both the African-American and white communities of Dorchester County. In 1852, he served as a delegate to the Convention of the Free Colored People of Maryland in Baltimore, where he resisted efforts to encourage emigration to Africa.

He and his wife attended 1855 National Convention of Colored Citizens of the United States, held at Franklin Hall in Philadelphia, as a delegate from Maryland. He met prominent Northern black abolitionists there, including Mary Ann Shadd Cary, Frederick Douglass, Jacob Gibbs, Stephen Myers, William Cooper Nell, Charles Lenox Remond, and John Rock.

== Underground Railroad ==
Green provided shelter for Harriet Tubman and people fleeing slavery. He was a suspected operator, but he was held in high esteem by the white community so he was able to operate freely for some time.

He helped coordinate Underground Railroad activity, including the escape of his son, his son's friends, and the Dover Eight. In 1854, Samuel Jr. sent a letter urging his parents to come to Canada, and asking for their help in encouraging his friends to runaway. Peter Jackson followed Sam Jr. to Canada in 1854. In late 1856, Joe Bailey and Peter Pennington ran away and were helped by Green. Green traveled to Canada to visit his son and made plans to move there with his wife.

=== Samuel Jr's flight ===
In August 1854, Sam Jr., a skilled blacksmith, ran away from Muse. Harriet Tubman provided encouragement and instructions for him. He found his way to the Philadelphia office of William Still, prominent in the Underground Railroad, who recorded the facts about Green's escape. Still forwarded him to Charles Hicks Bustill in Philadelphia, where he stayed for four days. At some point, he assumed the name of Wesley Kinnard for the trip and received a few dollars. Green traveled to New York City and then was guided to Canada, the town of Salford in Ontario. Once settled, Sam, Jr. wrote to his parents, telling them of his successful journey to freedom, which included "plenty of friends, plenty to eat, and to drink." After his escape, his sister was separated from her family when she was sold away to Missouri.

Samuel Jr. married a woman named Louisa and they had at least three children. In 1861, his wife and two children lived in Norwich, Ontario. Ten years later, he lived in Ancaster, Ontario. (Note: Salford, Norwich, and Ancaster lie between London and Hamilton, Ontario.) He died of pneumonia in 1875 at 45 years of age.

=== Dover Eight ===
Green, who lived in East New Market, provided assistance to the Dover Eight during their escape from Bucktown, Maryland. He was suspected to have been involved in the incident and Sheriff Robert Bell searched his house after Green returned from a trip to visit his son in Canada. Among other documents, Bell found a letter from his son Samuel who lived in Canada, a map of Canada, railroad schedules, and the book Uncle Tom's Cabin (1852) by Harriet Beecher Stowe. Green was arrested on April 4, 1857, for having Uncle Tom's Cabin, considered an "abolitionist handbill". The book and other materials were believed to have been "calculated to create discontent amongst the colored population". Green became a symbol of free blacks who would help others escape slavery.

=== Trial ===
Charles F. Goldsborough prosecuted the case against Green in a two-week trial in a Dorchester County, Maryland court. Unable to find direct evidence of Green's involvement in the Underground Railroad, Goldsborough argued that Uncle Tom's Cabin was "insurrectionary in intent." James Wallace, a slaveholder, was Green's defense attorney who "vigorously" defended Green and argued against the characterizations of the abolitionist material. He was acquitted of being in possession of "abolition papers of an inflammatory character," but was found guilty of the felony charge of possessing "a certain abolition pamphlet called 'Uncle Tom's Cabin' ... calculated to create discontent amongst the colored population,'" based upon Chapter 272 of the Act of 1841 of Maryland, which stated that "if any free Negroes or mulatto knowingly have in his or her possession any abolition handbill, pamphlet, newspaper, pictorial representation or other paper of an inflammatory character, having a tendency to create discontent amongst or stir up to insurrection the people of color in this state, he or she shall be deemed guilty of felony." If convicted, they could be sentenced ten to twenty years in prison. He was sentenced to at least ten years at the Maryland Penitentiary in Baltimore on May 14, 1857. It was very unusual for someone to be convicted of possessing an anti-slavery book.

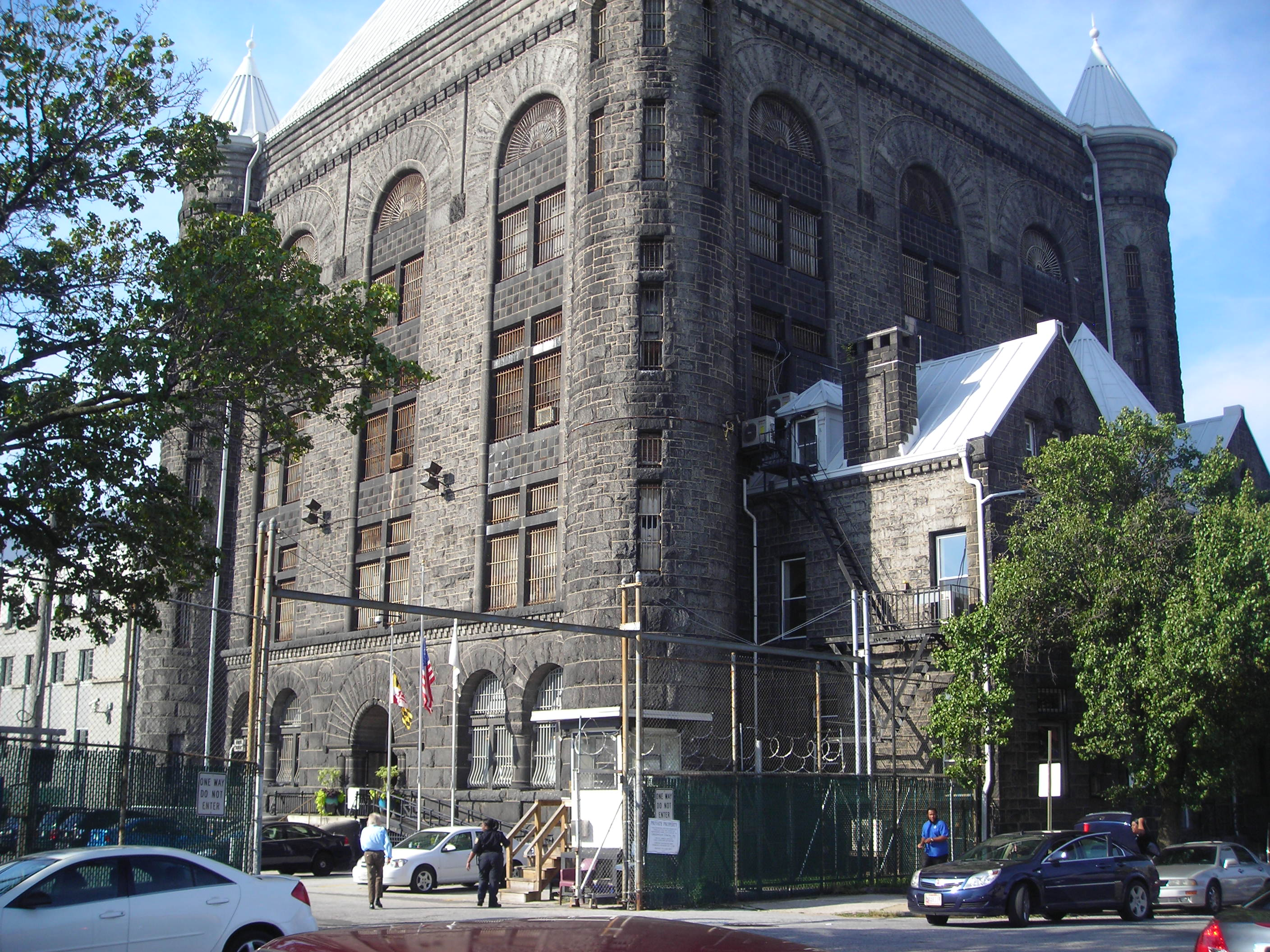
Maryland State Penitentiary

Green was imprisoned in the Maryland State Penitentiary in Baltimore. While there, he managed paperwork for the warden because he could read and write. The Greens sold their property to pay for the cost of the trial. His wife Catherine moved to Baltimore and took in laundry.

Governors of Maryland were pressed to pardon Green, primarily by white Methodists who stated that Uncle Tom's Cabin was owned by a lot of people, perhaps including the governor. There were more runaways after the Dover Eight's escape and slaveholders wrote to the governors with their concern. After receiving a petition of a number of people asking Governor Hicks to pardon Green, according to Green, the governor stated, "I know Green. So far his moral character goes, he is an honest man; but if I pardon him, I shall be called an abolitionist and mobbed." In March 1862, Governor Augustus Bradford pardoned Green under the condition that he left the state within 60 days.

== Final years ==
When he was freed, his story was of interest to fellow abolitionists and Green made speeches along the East Coast of the United States. He worked with William Lloyd Garrison and William Still. He received a copy of Uncle Tom's Cabin from Harriet Beecher Stowe. Green and his wife Eliza moved to London, Ontario.

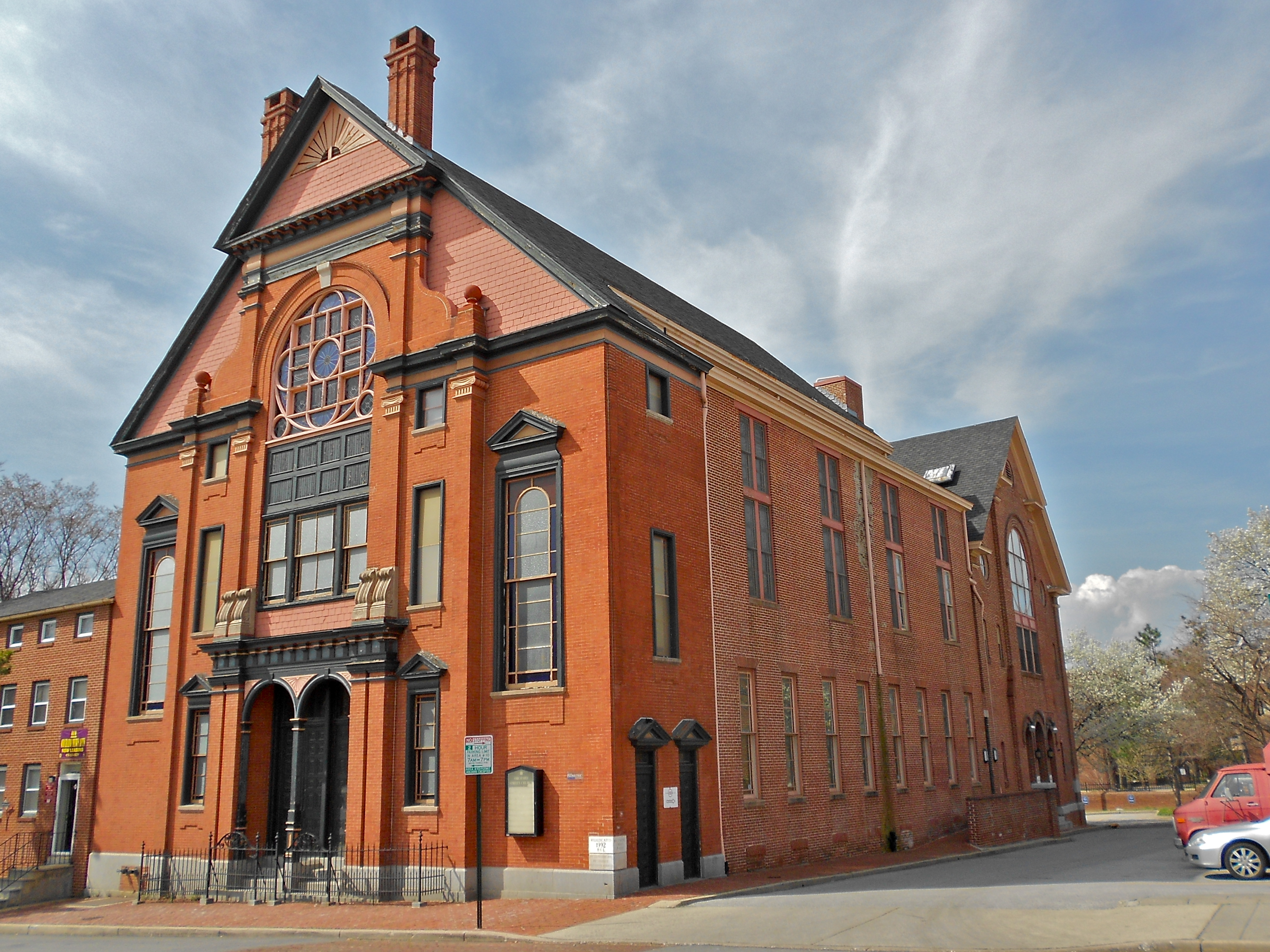
Orchard Street United Methodist Church

After the end of the American Civil War (1861–1865), Green worked as a domestic servant.

In 1870, Green returned to Dorchester County, where he lived with his wife Catherine and 9 year old Frank Green. He was a member of the Delaware Conference of the Methodist Episcopal Church, where he focused on education. They settled in Baltimore in 1874. He co-founded and worked at the Centenary Biblical Institute (now Morgan State University). The school taught men to become ministers. The Greens were members of the Orchard Street United Methodist Church in Baltimore.

Green died in Baltimore on February 28, 1877. He was buried at South Baltimore Cemetery, the historic Mount Auburn Cemetery, Baltimore's oldest African-American cemetery.

== Legacy ==
- In 2007, Faith United Methodist Church of East New Market received an Outstanding Project Heritage Award by the Heart of Chesapeake Country Heritage Areas of the Dorchester County Tourism Department. During their October Heritage Day in 2007, Green was portrayed in a play in which he was helped found of the Mt. Zion Methodist Church, now Faith United Methodist Church, and he as a trustee of the church. The play also depicted his imprisonment for having the Uncle Tom's Cabin book (following the escape of the Dover Eight). The play was written and produced by Barry O. Foreman, a local playwright.
- There is also a historical marker at the Faith United Methodist Church that relates the story of Green's life.
- An exhibit at the Dorchester County Courthouse in Cambridge, Maryland tells about how Green was tried and convicted for possessing a volume of Uncle Tom's Cabin.
- Nkeiru Okoye wrote the opera Harriet Tubman: When I Crossed that Line to Freedom which depicts Green as a character. It was first performed in 2014.

== See also ==
- List of slaves
- Harriet (2019 film)
