= Tilly Escape =

Slave escape aided by Harriet Tubman

Harriet Tubman

The Tilly Escape occurred in October 1856 when an enslaved woman, Tilly, was led by Harriet Tubman from slavery in Baltimore to safety in Philadelphia. Historians who have studied Tubman consider it "one of her most complicated and clever escape attempts." It was a risky trip because Tubman and Tilly would not have been able to travel directly from Baltimore to Philadelphia without proof that they were free women. In addition, local slave traders would have recognized strangers. Tubman sought to evade capture by going south, before heading north, and using different modes of transportation over water and land.

== Background ==
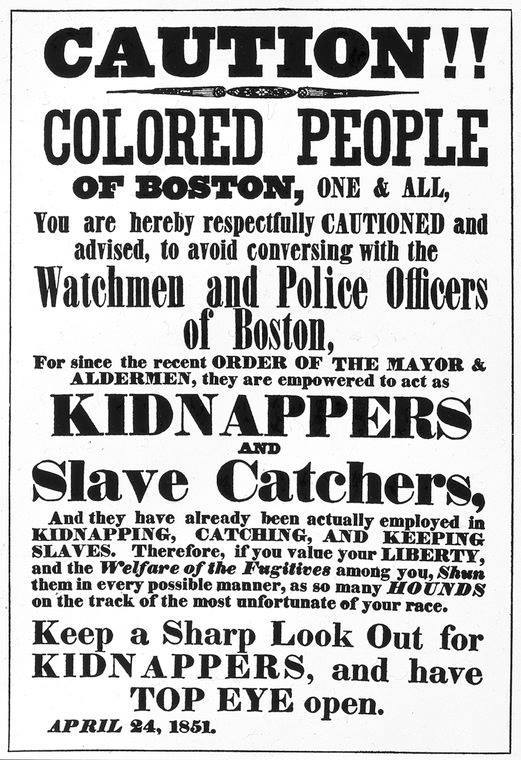
A poster created after the enactment of the Fugitive Slave Act of 1850

Into the 1850s, it was hard for Tubman to make trips between Maryland and Canada. She had health problems, which delayed travel. The trips required money. White slaveholders became increasingly agitated by the number of people fleeing slavery. And the plans required finding a good time to make a successful escape. The Fugitive Slave Act of 1850 meant that slave traders could travel into the northern, free states. The law compelled people to help identify fugitive slaves.

Tubman had coordinated the trip for Tilly with other plans, including helping five young men escape from the Eastern Shore of Maryland (Francis Molock, Cyrus Mitchell, Joshua Handy, Charles Dutton, and Ephraim Hudson), helping two children escape, and attempting to bring her sister Rachel and her children north, which was problematic after Rachel's children were sold and separated from her.

== Escape ==
Tilly's fiancé was a former slave who fled to Canada to avoid being sold in 1848 or 1849 and he had waited for Tilly to join him. He asked Harriet Tubman to guide Tilly from Baltimore and gave Tubman money for expenses. Tubman arranged for a letter of passage from a steamboat captain in Philadelphia that identified her as a free woman from the city of brotherly love. She traveled on his steamship through the Chesapeake & Delaware Canal to Baltimore. With this letter, she was able to obtain a pass for Tilly from the captain of the steamboat for their travel from Baltimore. (Note: The two steamboat captains knew one another. Steamboat travel was advantageous for freedom seekers. They blended in with other travelers and in some cases captains and the crew made it easy for them to travel.)

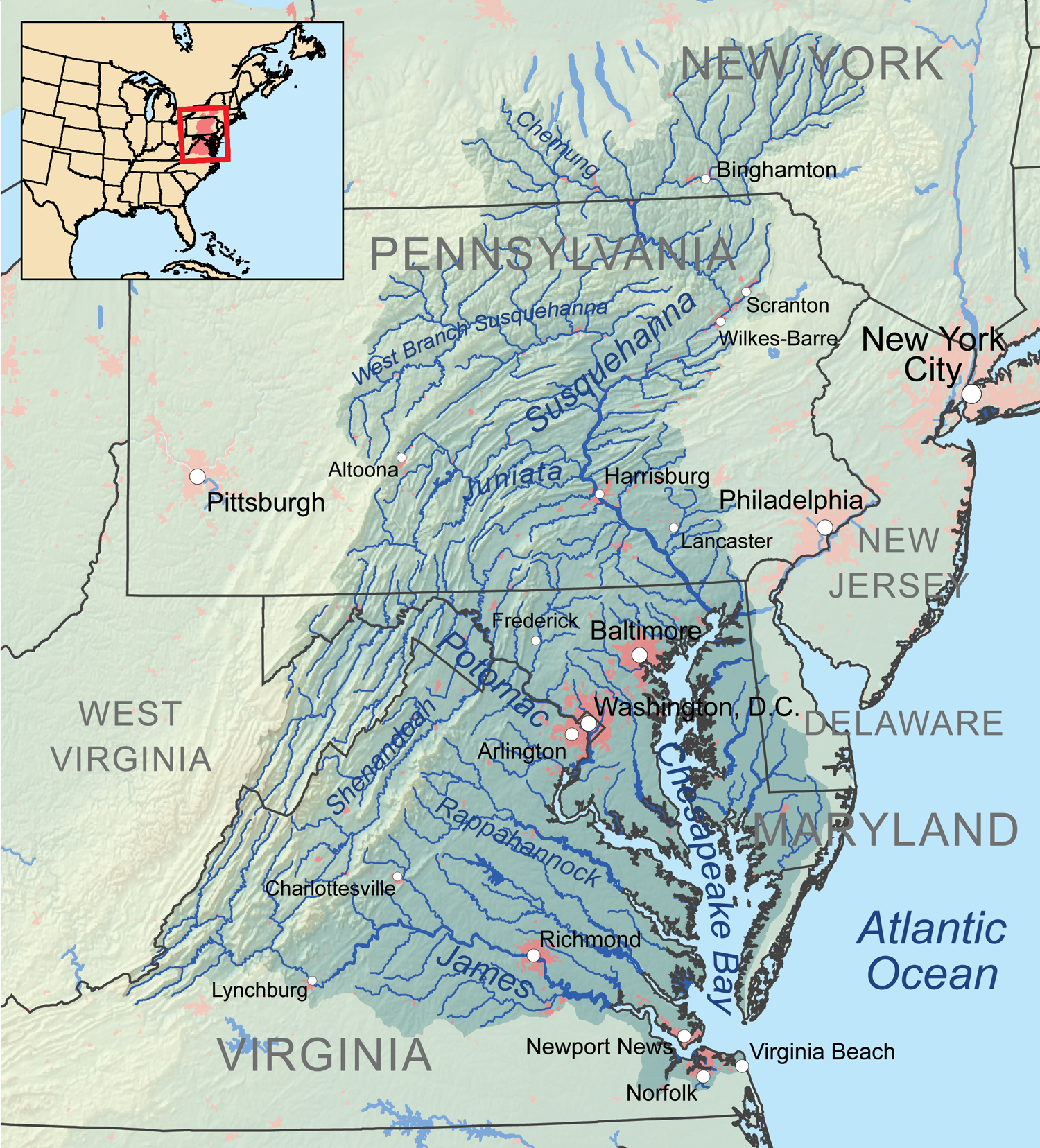
Map of the Chesapeake Bay. Tubman traveled south from Philadelphia to Baltimore where she met up with Tilly. They took a steamboat south through the Chesapeake Bay and then northeast on the Nanticoke River, landing at Seaford (in the center of Delaware). They walked north to Bridgeville took a train to Camden, and a carriage to Wilmington. Then they traveled north to Philadelphia

Tubman located Tilly in Baltimore and they traveled to Seaford, Delaware by a steamboat named Steamboat Kent. They traveled south through Chesapeake Bay for 40 mi (64 km) and then north-east via the Nanticoke River and landed in Seaford. (Note: Another reason for traveling south was to avoid paying a $500 (equivalent to $17,917 in 2025) bond for each of them to guarantee that they were both free women to travel north (through Maryland and Delaware).) They spent the night at the only hotel in town, now the site of Gateway Park. A slave trader found them there, but Tubman showed him their passes and he let them go. (Note: Another version is that the landlord intervened and held the slave trader up so that they could get away and avoid being arrested.) She later recalled that she had prayed at the time, "Oh, Lord! You've been with me in six troubles, don't desert me in the seventh!"

In point of courage, shrewdness, and disinterested exertions to rescue her fellow-men, by making personal visits to Maryland among the slaves, she was without her equal.

— William Still

From Seaford, they walked eight miles north to Bridgeville and then traveled north to Camden by train. In Camden they met up with William Brinkley who was a free black man, an Underground Railroad conductor, and Tubman's friend. He took them on the 50 mi (80 km)-long journey to Wilmington. In Wilmington, they went to the house of abolitionist and Underground Railroad leader Thomas Garrett. He gave Tubman $25 that had been sent for Tubman by Eliza Wigham. It was welcome relief as Tubman could use the money towards the expense of a rescue mission of her sister Rachel and her children, and both Tilly and Tubman needed new shoes. They went on to Philadelphia, where Tilly's fiancé met up with them, likely at William Still's office. He was an Underground Railroad operator and a leading abolitionist. The couple traveled on to Canada and Tubman went back to Maryland and rescued a family of four.

== Speculation of Tilly's identity ==
Mary Thompson Bayly placed an advertisement in the Baltimore Sun newspaper with a reward for the capture of "Laura" who had fled on the same day that Tilly ran away. Bayly and her father Dr. Anthony C. Thompson were known by Harriet Tubman's family and other people enslaved by Thompson. In 1839, Matilda and Laura were on Thompson's probate list. There is speculation that Matilda or Laura may have been Tilly.

== Legacy ==
A historical marker about the Tilly escape site is located at the corner of North Market and High Streets at Gateway Park in Seaford. In September 2013, the site was made a location on the National Underground Railroad Network to Freedom by the National Park Service. It is the only known escape where Tubman traveled the Nanticoke.
