= Dover Eight =

Slaves who escaped from Maryland in 1857

The Dover Eight's journey began in Maryland and then through Delaware. The riskiest legs were through these slave states. They crossed the Mason–Dixon line into a free state at Philadelphia, Pennsylvania.

The route provided by Harriet Tubman was 1) Bucktown, 2) East New Market, 3) Poplar Neck, 4) Milford, Delaware, 5) Dover, 6) some went through Smyrna to get to Wilmington, 7) Wilmington to 8) Philadelphia, followed by points north along the Underground Railroad to Canada.

The Dover Eight refers to a group of eight black people who escaped their slaveholders of the Bucktown, Maryland area around March 8, 1857. They were helped along the way by a number of people from the Underground Railroad, except for Thomas Otwell, who turned them in once they had made it north to Dover, Delaware. There, they were lured to the Dover jail with the intention of getting the $3,000 reward for the eight men. The Dover Eight escaped the jail and made it to Canada.

== Preparation ==
The Dover Eight included two women and six men. Two of the men, Denard Hughes and Tom Elliott, were from the Pritchard Meredith Farm. The others were Bill Kiah, Emily Kiah, Lavina Woolfley, James Woolfley, Henry Predeaux, and one unknown person.

When the Dover Eight decided to run away, they were given directions by Harriet Tubman. The route was particularly dangerous for blacks to pass through slave states, those south of the Mason–Dixon line, after the passing of the Fugitive Slave Act of 1850. It was also dangerous to share "even a hint of abolitionist sentiment." The Dover Eight carried cudgels and pistols for their protection.

== Flight ==
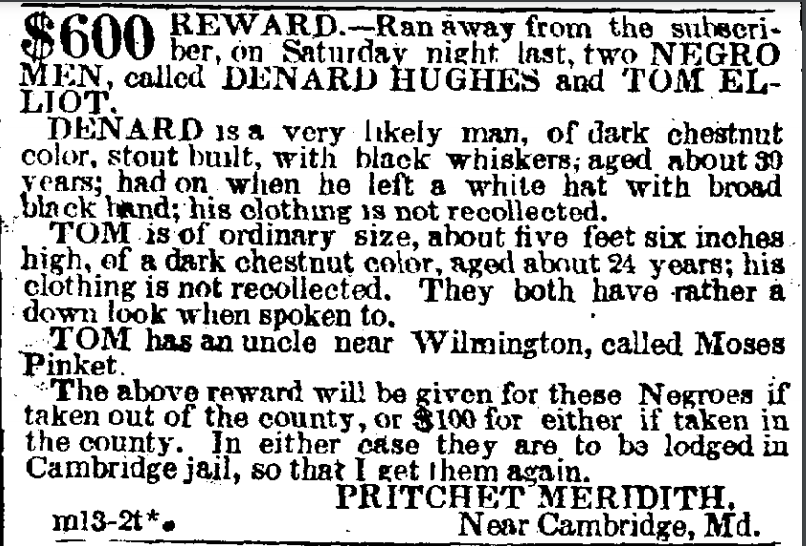
Advertisement of a $600 reward for the capture of two of the Dover Eight, Denard Hughes and Tom Elliott. The ad was placed in the Baltimore Sun newspaper by March 11.

A number of people helped the Dover Eight along their way. In East New Market they received assistance from Reverend Samuel Green. Once in Caroline County, they contacted Ben Ross, the father of Harriet Tubman, at Poplar Neck. Ross hid the eight runaways in his cabin.

In Delaware, they met up with Thomas Otwell, a free black Underground Railroad conductor who was trusted by Harriet Tubman. For $8, Otwell was to take the group from Milford, Delaware to a place north of Dover. Instead of providing safety and shelter and leading them to the next Underground Railroad station, he chose to turn the eight in to collect a $3,000 (equivalent to $103,661 in 2025) reward. Otwell contacted James Hollis to help him thwart the plans of the Dover Eight. Sheriff Green of Dover was alerted that the eight runaways were coming through the area and there were plans to capture them at the jail. The runaways were told that they were being taken into the town of Dover until the following night.

The sheriff ensured that there were several other men to capture them at the Dover jail. At 4:00 in the morning, James Hollis met up with the Dover Eight, who were cold and tired. They were told that Hollis was a friend of runaway slaves. He guided them to the Dover jail. They were led up a dark flight of stairs and the freedom seekers saw iron bars in the moonlight or when a light was lit. They were led to a room where the sheriff intended to hold them. The room did not have a fire, and they left the room. Henry Predeaux said that he "did not like the looks of the place." When Sheriff Green realized that the runaways had not stayed in the room, he ran downstairs into the private quarters, where his wife and children were sleeping, to get a pistol. The fugitives followed him to find a warm room. While Green reached for the gun, Predeaux sent "a shovel full of fire" towards the sheriff and Hughes helped resist the law men. The runaways broke a window and escaped through it. They then jumped out the window, falling 12 feet to the ground, and then climbed over a wall around the jail to get to the street.

Confused about which way to go, six of the party traveled back to Camden (in Dover) and caught up with Otwell who promised to take them on to William Brinkley, as originally planned. William Brinkley helped the runaways make the 19-mile trek through forest roads on foot from Dover to Smyrna through "the two worst places this side of the Maryland line". (Note: Once Otwell had delivered the runaways to Brinkley, his whereabouts have been unknown.) Predeaux jumped out the broken window, and found that he was separated from the other runaways. Predeaux traveled on his own to Thomas Garrett's house. It is not known what happened to the eighth person in the group.

Throughout the night, the sheriff with some slave catchers tried to find the runaways. Three of the slave owners were also looking for the group. The lawmen tracked some of the runaways back to the Camden area of Dover, but were unable to get a warrant from magistrates to enter and search the house due to insufficient evidence. Two of the runaways headed north.

Garrett had also been watching out for the group for several nights and found some of them near Wilmington and brought them to his home. Four were found by two men hired by Garrett and they took them by boat across the Christina River to another Underground Railroad station. James Woolfley and four others made it William Still's office (in Philadelphia). Still recorded the details of their experiences at Dover and planned for the rest of their journey along the Underground Railroad. They continued north to Canada.

Rewards from $300 to $400 per person were offered for each member of the group, which would be $3,000 or more for all of the freedom seekers.

== Biographies ==
=== Tom Elliott ===
Tom Elliott was from Pritchard Meredith's farm. Elliott made it safely to Canada and settled in the black refugee community of St. Catharines, Ontario, where Tubman also lived. Elliott became a good friend of Tubman. He stayed in St. Catharines for a while, and then moved to Auburn, New York, where Tubman, who had been sick in Canada, settled.

Elliott married Ann Marie Stewart, Tubman's great-niece, around 1864. They had two daughters Nellie and Mary. Following Ann Marie's death by 1880, Elliott married Helen, born in New York. Her parents were born in Canada.

=== Denard Hughes ===
Denard Hughes, also known as Daniel Hughes, and Tom Elliott were from the Pritchard Meredith Farm in Bucktown. Pritchett Meredith had at least 14 enslaved blacks. Hughes described Meredith as "the hardest man around." Mrs. Meredith was temperamental and a heavy drinker. He made it safely to Canada and settled in black refugee community of St. Catharines, Ontario, where Tubman also lived. He left aunts, uncles, brothers, and sisters in the south.

=== Henry Predeaux ===
Henry Predeaux, also spelled Predo, decided to run away after his slaveholder, district court judge Ara Spence, threatened to sell the 27-year-old to the Deep South. It is unknown what happened to Predeaux after the escape from the Dover jail.

=== Lavina and James Woolfley ===
Lavina Woolfley and her husband James Woolfley, were owned by Samuel Harrington of Cambridge, Maryland. James ran away with the Dover Eight. At some point, Lavina was separated from the group. (Note: Lavina is also said to have stayed back in Cambridge or she went with the Dover Eight and made it to Philadelphia, where she was helped by conductors of the Underground Railroad.) One account is that Lavina stayed behind with friends where she would be safe. In the meantime, James went quickly on to Canada. After he arrived, he sent a letter back stating that he arrived safely and asking Lavina to come to Canada. Lavina hid out for several months and made it to Philadelphia, where William Still told that her husband was waiting for her in Canada. In 1857, Lavina traveled north with 24-year-old Ann Johnson who had also been enslaved by Harrington.

=== Ann Johnson ===
Born about 1833, Ann was a domestic servant and field hand who worked with a hoe and plow. She was one of five or six people enslaved by Samuel Harrington. Johnson was a tall, intelligent woman with a chestnut complexion. Harrington was an ill-tempered man. Her brothers, who had been enslaved by Harrington, ran away about 1853 or 1854. After her brothers ran away and settled in Canada in 1854, a frustrated Harrington then sold his remaining slaves; Johnson was sold to William Moore and his wife, who were given to "intemperance and carousing". Johnson walked away on her bare feet, wearing a well-worn dress on April 26, 1856. A $50 reward was offered in the American Eagle. (Note: Her biography at the State of Maryland Archives states that she was a member of the eight runaways who were taken to the Dover Jail, but appears to be an erroneous conclusion.) She and Lavina Woolfley made it to Philadelphia along the Underground Railroad.

=== Emily and William Kiah ===
William Kiah was enslaved by Benjamin G. Tubman and Emily belonged to Ann Craig.

William and Emily Kiah appear to have been separated from the group who arrived at William Still's office in Philadelphia. They had a daughter, Mary, who they had to leave behind and may have stayed in Maryland, Delaware, or Pennsylvania.

== Trial of Samuel Green ==
Reverend Samuel Green was suspected to have been involved in the incident and Sheriff Robert Bell searched his house after Green returned from a trip to visit his son in Canada. Among other documents, Bell found a letter from his son Samuel who lived in Canada, a map of Canada, railroad schedules, and the book Uncle Tom's Cabin (1852) by Harriet Beecher Stowe. Green was arrested on April 4, 1857, for having Uncle Tom's Cabin, considered an "abolitionist handbill". The book and other materials were believed to have been "calculated to create discontent amongst the colored population". Green became a symbol of free blacks who would help others escape slavery.

Charles F. Goldsborough prosecuted the case against Green in a two-week trial in a court of Dorchester County, Maryland. Unable to find direct evidence of Green's involvement in the Underground Railroad, Goldsborough argued that Uncle Tom's Cabin was "insurrectionary in intent." James Wallace, a slaveholder, was Green's defense attorney "vigorously" defended Green and argued against the characterizations of the abolitionist material. He was acquitted of being in possession of "abolition papers of an inflammatory character," but was found guilty of the felony charge of possessing "a certain abolition pamphlet called 'Uncle Tom's Cabin' ... calculated to create discontent amongst the colored population,'" based upon Chapter 272 of the Act of 1841, which stated that if any free black "knowingly receive or have in his possession any abolition handbill, pamphlet, newspaper, pictorial representation or other paper of an inflammatory character," which could "create discontent amongst or to stir up to insurrection the people of color of this State, he or she shall be deemed guilt of felony." If convicted, they could be sentenced ten to twenty years in prison. He was sentenced to at least ten years at the Maryland Penitentiary in Baltimore on May 14, 1857. It was very unusual for someone to be convicted by possessing an anti-slavery book. Governors of Maryland were pressed to pardon Green, which did not occur until March 1862. Governor Augustus Bradford pardoned Green under the condition that he left the state within 60 days.

== Other repercussions ==
Slave holders on the Eastern Shore became enraged by the event and even more aware that slaves were determined to seek freedom, which was happening in greater numbers in the late 1850s. Ben Ross had been a suspect as an operative on the Underground Railroad, creating concern that the nearly-70-year-old man would be arrested. Hearing the news, Harriet Tubman led her parents to safety in Canada.

This was seemingly the last straw for local slaveholders, who had been losing their property to the North at an alarming rate throughout the preceding decade. As far as whites were concerned, there must have been an accomplice or at least someone who had encouraged the bondsmen with radical ideas about freedom.

— Samuel Green biography, Archives of Maryland

Slaveholders became more vigilant in monitoring enslaved and free blacks. This put Samuel Green, Ben Ross, and Underground Railroad operators in danger.

The event made for a legendary story among abolitionists.

== John Brown's raid on Harpers Ferry ==
Harriet Tubman asked the new Black Canadians to join a contingent of troops for John Brown's raid on Harpers Ferry, with the intention of abolishing slavery. She found a number of men to sign up—including Elliott and Hughes—but they ultimately backed out of the planned insurrection.
