= Hughes A.M.E. Chapel =

Historic church in Maryland, US

- U.S. National Register of Historic Places
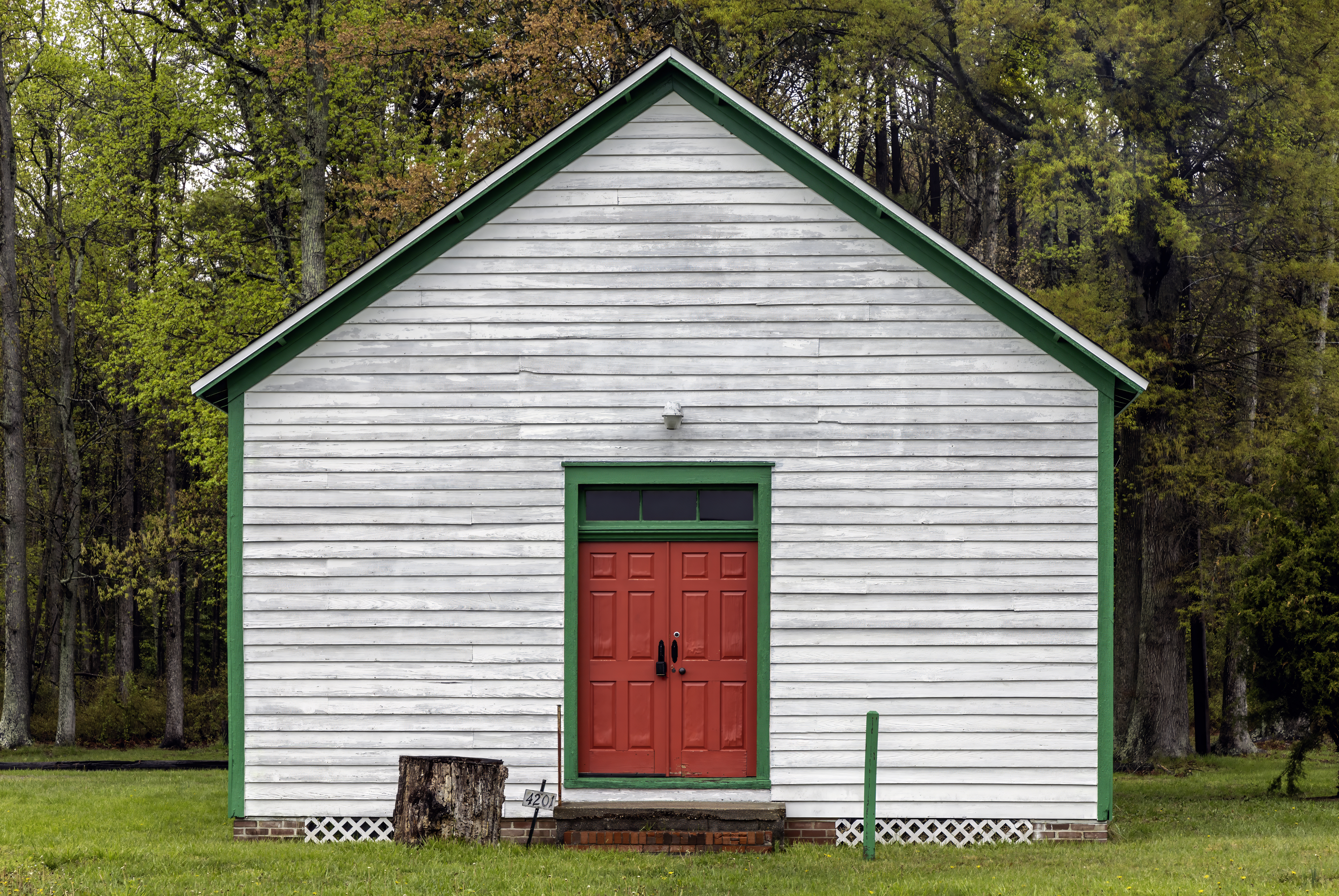

- Location within Maryland Location within the United States
- Location: 4201 Maple Dam Rd.
- Nearest city: Cambridge, Maryland
- Coordinates: 38°20′21.6″N 76°04′17.2″W
- Built: 1894
- NRHP reference No.: 100002630
- Added to NRHP: June 29, 2018

Hughes A.M.E. Chapel, also known as the Trinity Methodist Episcopal Church and the Nause-Waiwash Longhouse, is a historic religious building located near Bucktown in Dorchester County, Maryland, United States. The modest chapel is notable for its association with rural congregations of African-American and mixed-race peoples.

== History ==
The former church building is a common example of late 19th- and early 20th-century religious buildings that were built in rural communities on the Eastern Shore of Maryland. The chapel is one of several modest churches associated with African-American congregations in western Dorchester County in the area of Bucktown. Bucktown is closely associated with Harriet Tubman, who was born nearby. The Bucktown region was home to mixed-race people who were descended from Native, African, and European Americans.

The chapel was built between 1894 and 1900 for the Trinity Methodist Episcopal (M.E.) Church. In 1955 it was sold to the trustees of Hughes African Methodist Episcopal (A.M.E.) Chapel. The property was donated to the Nause-Waiwash Band of Indians in 1998. The Nause-Waiwash Band is a non-profit organization for people who self-identify as being of Nanticoke descent. The band includes descendants of original Trinity M.E. Church congregants.

== Description ==
The chapel is a simple rectangular frame structure, three bays in length, with a medium-pitched gable roof. The gable is oriented to the front, which faces a road intersection. The eaves are open with exposed rafter tails. To the rear is a shed-roof apse with windows on both side elevations. The exterior is covered with weatherboard siding. Windows are two-over-two sash units with shutters. The chapel's interior has a raised chancel, with one further step to the altar in the apse extension. The walls and ceiling are plaster, which at the time the chapel was nominated to the National Register of Historic Places were covered with paneling on the walls and a suspended ceiling. However, its interior and exterior are essentially unaltered from the original.

Hughes Chapel was listed on the National Register of Historic Places on June 29, 2018.

== See also ==
- Donna Abbott, Nause-Waiwash tribal leader
