= William Brinkley (disambiguation) =

William Brinkley (1917–1993) was an American writer and journalist.

William Brinkley may also refer to:

- William Brinkley (Underground Railroad), American conductor on the network that guided enslaved people to freedom in the Northern United States or Canada
- William R. Brinkley, American cellular biologist and scientific advocate
- William T. Brinkley, Kentucky politician
