= Lena King Lee =

American politician (1906–2006)

Member of the Maryland House of Delegates from the 4th district
- In office 1967–1982
- Succeeded by: Elijah Cummings

Personal details
- Born: Lena S. King; July 14, 1906 Sumter County, Alabama, U.S.
- Died: August 24, 2006 (aged 100) Baltimore, Maryland, U.S.
- Party: Democratic
- Spouse: Robert Lee
- Education: Morgan State University (BA); New York University (MA); University of Maryland (LLM)
- Occupation: Educator, attorney

Lena King Lee (July 14, 1906 – August 24, 2006) was an American educator, attorney, and politician who entered politics at the age of 60 and became one of the first African-American women elected to the Maryland General Assembly. Lee advocated for teachers' rights, women's rights, and affordable housing, and founded the Legislative Black Caucus of Maryland in 1970. She was inducted into the Maryland Women's Hall of Fame in 1989.

== Early life and education ==
She was born Lena King in Sumter County, Alabama, in 1906, one of three children of Samuel Sylvester King and Lula Gully King. Her father was a coal miner and a miners' activist who at times worked as a chauffeur and a butler to make ends meet. Lena attended public schools in Alabama, Illinois, and Pennsylvania, as her father moved around in search of mining jobs. After graduating from Tarentum High School, where she was the only black student and finished third in a class of 70, a teacher arranged for her to receive a scholarship to Cheyney University of Pennsylvania, where she trained as a teacher. In 1927, she moved to Annapolis, Maryland, to take her first teaching job. Four years later she moved to Baltimore, where she taught sixth grade in the Baltimore public schools. Early in her teaching career she joined the American Federation of Teachers and fought for teachers' rights.

After earning a Bachelor of Science degree from Morgan State University in 1939, Lee was barred from pursuing graduate studies at the University of Maryland due to racial segregation. Maryland instead paid for African Americans to attend school out of state. Lee commuted by train to New York City on weekends, and received her Master of Arts degree from New York University in 1947. Decades later, she recalled in an interview, "By the time you got to New York, you were worn out, and of course we couldn't ride the Pullmans. This great country actually tolerated that." In 1952, she became the third black woman to receive a law degree from the University of Maryland School of Law. She was admitted to the Maryland Bar in 1953.

== Career ==
While pursuing her degrees, Lee continued to teach in the Baltimore public schools. She served as principal of Henry H. Garnett Elementary School from 1947 to 1964, remaining there even after earning her law degree and being admitted to the bar. As a lawyer she worked mostly on domestic cases. In the 1950s Mayor Thomas D'Alesandro Jr. appointed her to the Baltimore Housing and Urban Renewal Commission, where she fought for affordable housing for the city's black community. Later she served on the Maryland Advisory Council for Higher Education as an appointee of Governor J. Millard Tawes.

In 1966 she was drafted to run for state delegate. She ran on a progressive platform and was elected that November. Lee represented Baltimore's 4th legislative district (now the 44th) from 1967 to 1982. During her 16 years in the Maryland House of Delegates, she became known for attacking what she considered "bad bills." She saved the historic Orchard Street Church from demolition, helped get Morgan State University accredited, and advocated for the rights of teachers, women, and children. She founded the Maryland Legislative Black Caucus in 1970. In a 1996 interview in the Crisis she recalled, "There was a need to huddle together. There's still a need and we don't realize it. We think we've made it. I often wonder where we're going."

In 1971, Lee proposed a "Marriage-Contractual Renewal Bill," which would have allowed Maryland residents to annul or renew their marriages every three years. The bill received national attention, and Lee made appearances on the Merv Griffin Show and the Today Show. Although the bill did not pass, Lee's efforts contributed to Maryland's eventual adoption of no-fault divorce.

=== Awards and honors ===
Lee received a Presidential Citation from the National Association for Equal Opportunity in Higher Education in 1988. She was inducted into the Maryland Women's Hall of Fame in 1989. In 1995 she received the Distinguished Jurist Award from the National Bar Association and was inducted into the National Bar Association Hall of Fame. She is featured in 2000 Women of Achievement, Bicentennial Issue of Who's Who in America, Who's Who of Women, Black Americans, International Biography, and Women of Achievement in Maryland History.

In December 2005, the United States House of Representatives voted to name the post office at 1826 Pennsylvania Avenue in Baltimore, in Lee's honor. The legislation was sponsored by Representative Elijah Cummings, who credited Lee with getting him started in politics. Lee attended the dedication ceremony in June 2006.

Her papers are stored in the Thurgood Marshall Law Library at the University of Maryland School of Law.

== Personal life ==
In 1937 she married Robert Lee, a Baltimore businessman. Her husband died circa 1965.

After leaving public office, Lee was active in many civic and cultural organizations, including the Monumental City Bar Association, the Maryland League of Women's Clubs, the DuBois Circle, the Sharp Street Memorial United Methodist Church, the Herbert M. Frisby Historical Society, and the Madison Park Improvement Association. She died on August 24, 2006, at her home in Baltimore.
