= Donna Abbott =

Maryland Women's Hall of Fame Inductee in Maryland

Donna "Wolf Mother" Abbott
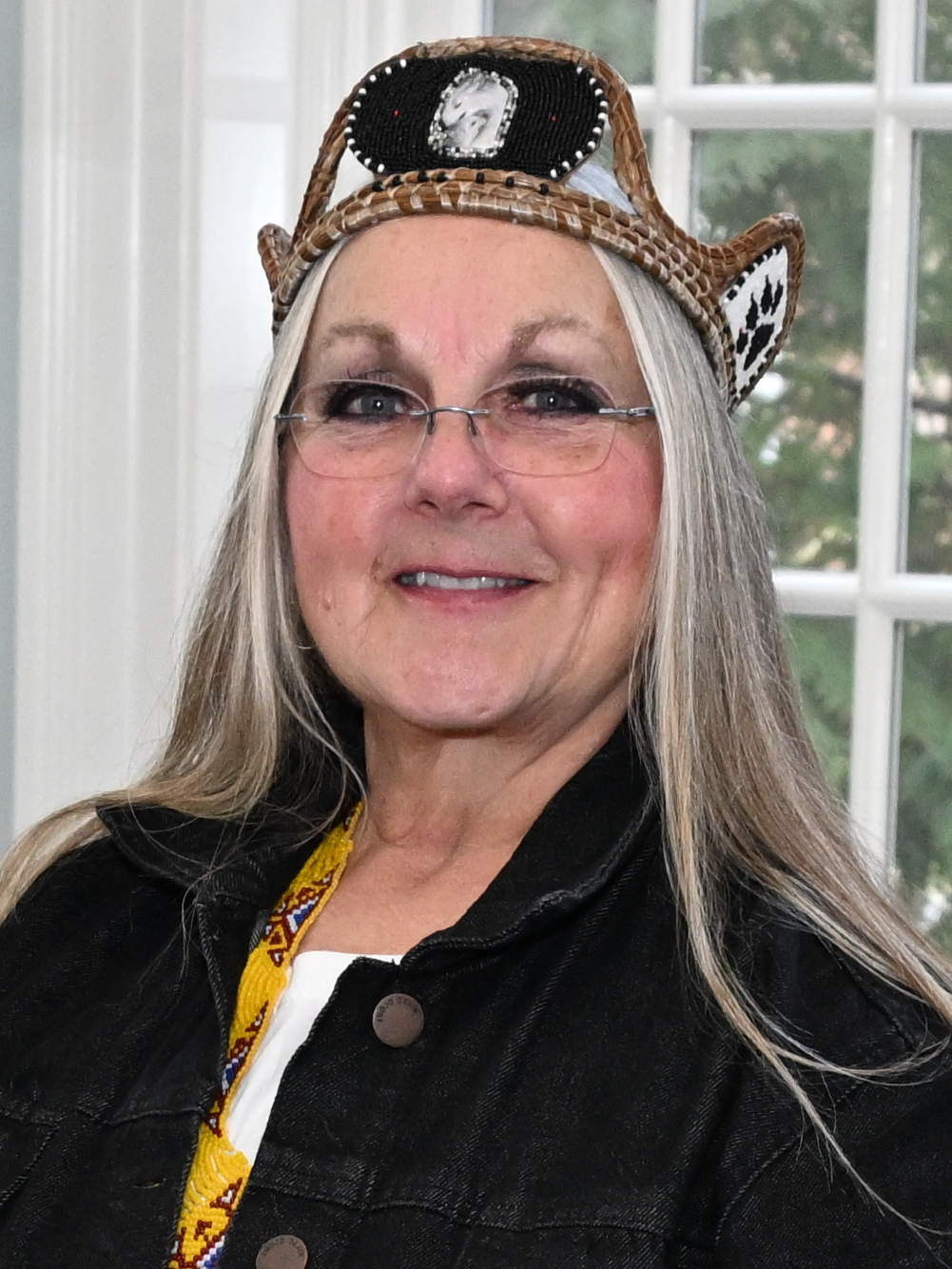
- Born: Dorchester County, Maryland
- Education: Chesapeake College
- Occupations: Tribal chief, radiologist
- Organization: Nause-Waiwash Band of Indians
- Known for: First woman chief of Nause-Waiwash Band of Indians
- Children: 1
- Honours: Maryland Women's Hall of Fame

Donna "Wolf Mother" Abbott is the first woman chief of the Nause-Waiwash Band of Indians and the first woman chief known in Maryland state history. In 2025, Abbott was named to the Maryland Women's Hall of Fame.

== Biography ==
Abbott was raised in Robbins, a small community in Dorchester County, Maryland. She grew up in a family that worked on the water, fishing, and trapping. Abbott attended Chesapeake College and spent thirty years in a career in radiology.

=== Nause-Waiwash Band of Indians ===
In 1988, a nonprofit organization named the Nause-Waiwash Band of Indians was formed by descendants from the Nanticoke and Choptank tribes. The Nause-Waiwash Band of Indians aims to recognize traditions of Eastern shore Native people, raise awareness and bring tribal people together. The group is represented on the Maryland Commission on Indian Affairs, but is not recognized by the state as a tribe. Abbott joined the group in the early 2000s and began to investigate its history. She also served as Treasurer and Secretary.

=== Leadership ===
In 2014, the band's first chief, Sewell Edward "Winterhawk" Fitzhugh passed away. Abbot was encouraged to run for the position as chief. Abbott was elected as chief of the band in 2015. Upon her appointment, Abbott was recognized as the first woman chief of a Maryland tribe in known history.

As chief, Abbott works to promote the Nause-Waiwash, organizes the band's summer gathering, and advocates for Native American history to be taught in local schools. Abbott is vocal about the role that climate change impacts the Eastern Shore lands that members of the tribe have long inhabited.

As chief, Abbott served on the Maryland Commission on Indian Affairs for six years. In her role, Abbott has described facing criticism for her gender and for passing as white. Abbott is one of the women depicted on the Dorchester Women's Mural that was unveiled in 2022.

In 2025, Abbott was named to the Maryland Women's Hall of Fame.

== See also ==
- Native American identity in the United States
- List of organizations that self-identify as Native American tribes
- Indigenous peoples of Maryland
- Hughes A.M.E. Chapel, property acquired by the tribe and used as a longhouse
