= Elijah Cummings =

American politician (1951–2019)

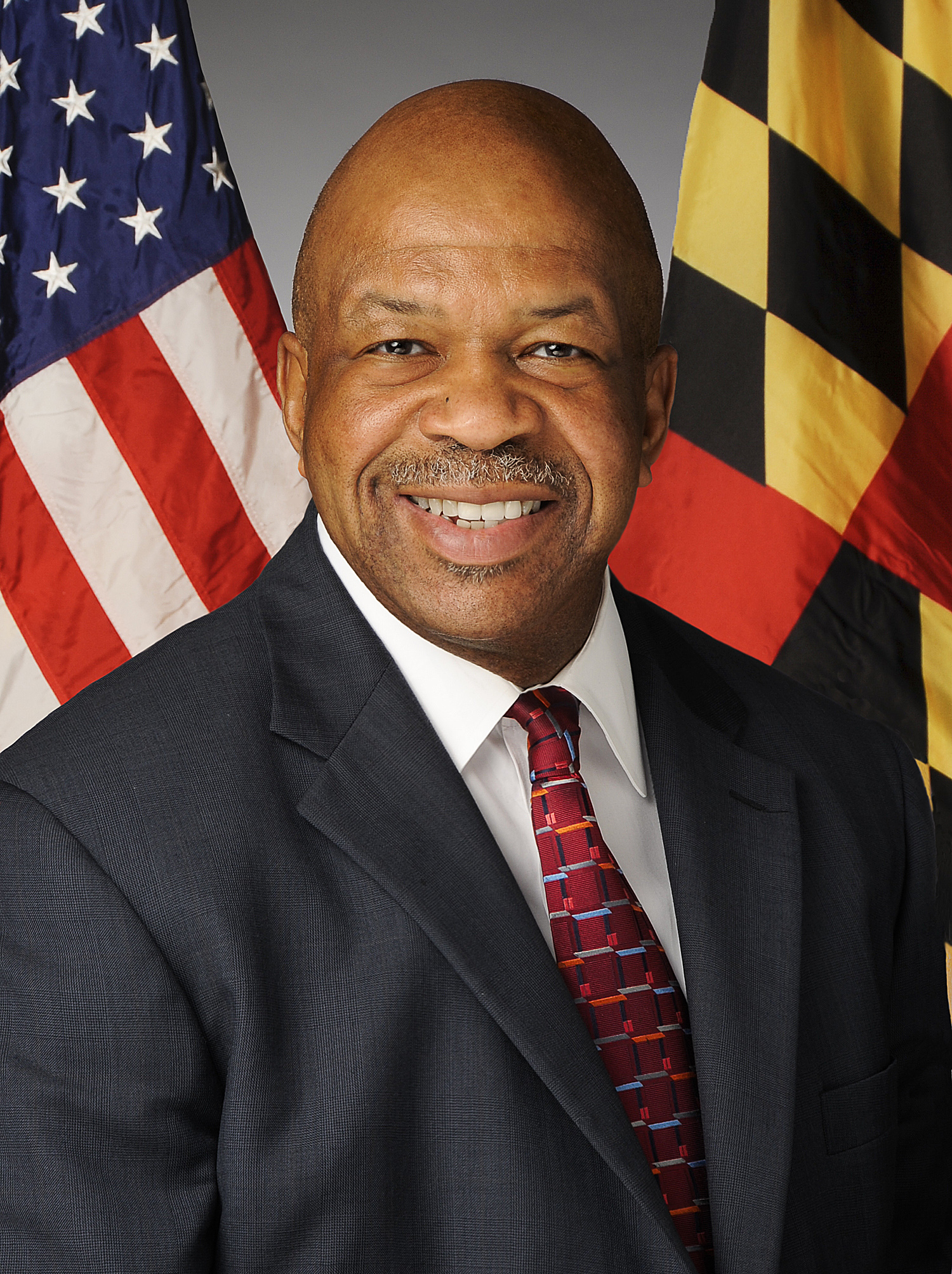
- Official portrait, 2008

Chair of the House Oversight Committee
- In office January 3, 2019 – October 17, 2019
- Preceded by: Trey Gowdy
- Succeeded by: Carolyn Maloney

Member of the U.S. House of Representatives from Maryland's 7th district
- In office April 16, 1996 – October 17, 2019 (Note: Cummings's official service begins on the date of the special election, while he was not sworn in until April 25, 1996.)
- Preceded by: Kweisi Mfume
- Succeeded by: Kweisi Mfume

Member of the Maryland House of Delegates from the 39th district
- In office January 12, 1983 – January 10, 1996
- Preceded by: Lena King Lee
- Succeeded by: Sterling Page

Personal details
- Born: Elijah Eugene Cummings; January 18, 1951 Baltimore, Maryland, U.S.
- Died: October 17, 2019 (aged 68) Baltimore, Maryland, U.S.
- Party: Democratic
- Spouses: Joyce Matthews (div. 1982); Maya Rockeymoore (m. 2008)
- Children: 3
- Education: Howard University (BA); University of Maryland, Baltimore (JD)
- Cummings's voice Cummings supporting the For the People Act of 2019. Recorded March 6, 2019

Elijah Eugene Cummings (January 18, 1951 – October 17, 2019) was an American politician and lawyer who served in the United States House of Representatives for Maryland's 7th congressional district from 1996 until his death in 2019, when he was succeeded by his predecessor Kweisi Mfume. The district he represented included over half of the city of Baltimore, including most of the majority-black precincts of Baltimore County, and most of Howard County, Maryland. A member of the Democratic Party, Cummings previously served in the Maryland House of Delegates from 1983 to 1996.

Cummings served as the chair of the Committee on Oversight and Reform from January 2019 until his death in October of the same year.

== Early life, education, and career ==
Cummings was born on January 18, 1951, in Baltimore, son of Ruth Elma (née Cochran) and Robert Cummings. His parents were sharecroppers. He was the third child of seven. When he was 11 years old, Cummings and some friends worked to integrate a segregated swimming pool in South Baltimore.

Cummings graduated with honors from Baltimore City College high school in 1969. He then attended Howard University in Washington, D.C., where he served in the student government as sophomore class president, student government treasurer, and later student government president. He became a member of the Phi Beta Kappa society and graduated in 1973 with a bachelor's degree in political science.

Cummings graduated from law school at the University of Maryland School of Law, receiving his Juris Doctor in 1976, and was admitted to the bar in Maryland later that year. He practiced law for 19 years before first being elected to the United States House of Representatives in the 1996 election.

For 14 years, Cummings served in the Maryland House of Delegates. His predecessor, Lena King Lee, raised funds and campaigned for him; years later, Cummings credited her with launching his political career. In the Maryland General Assembly, he served as Chairman of the Legislative Black Caucus of Maryland and was the first African American in Maryland history to be named Speaker Pro Tempore.

Cummings also served on several boards and commissions, both in and out of Baltimore. Those include SEED Schools of Maryland Board of Directors and the University of Maryland Law School Board of Advisors. He served on numerous Maryland boards and commissions including the Board of Visitors to the United States Naval Academy and the Elijah Cummings Youth Program in Israel. He was an honorary member of the Baltimore Zoo Board of Trustees.

In addition to his speaking engagements, he wrote a biweekly column for the Baltimore Afro-American newspaper.

Elijah Cummings was a member of Phi Beta Sigma and a Prince Hall Mason.

== U.S. House of Representatives ==
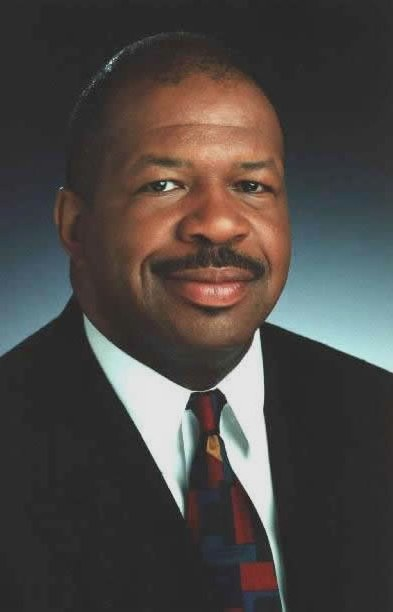
Earlier photo of Cummings

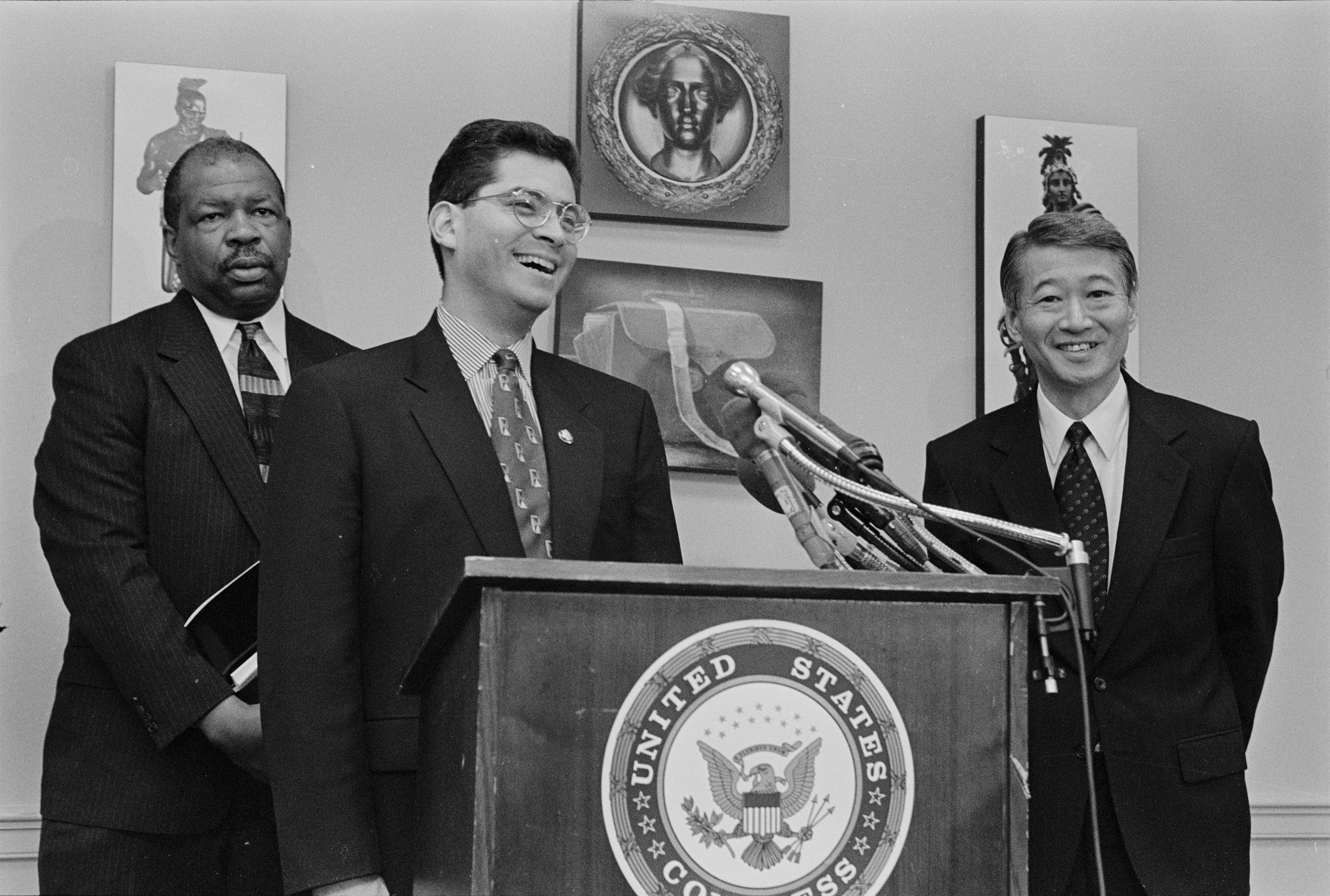
Elijah Cummings, Xavier Becerra, and Robert Matsui at a press conference on civil rights in 1997

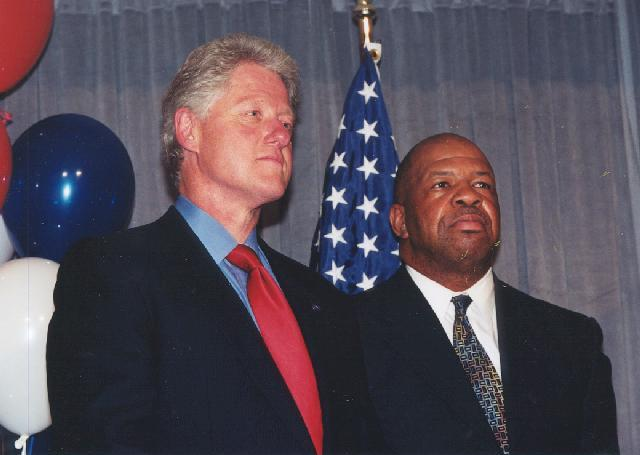
Cummings with Bill Clinton in 2000

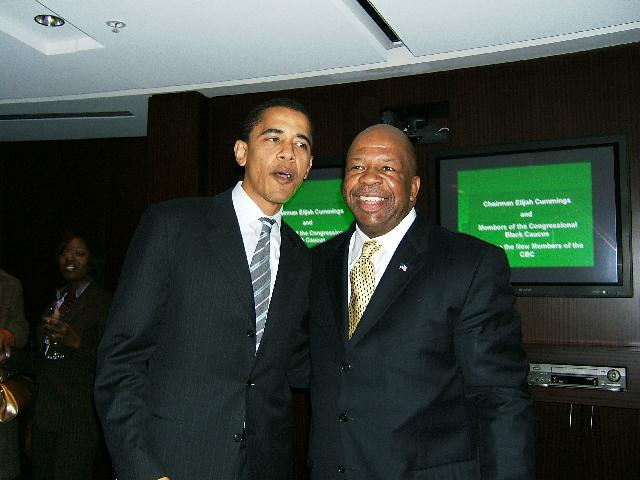
Cummings with Barack Obama in 2004

=== Committee assignments ===
- Committee on Transportation and Infrastructure
  - Subcommittee on Coast Guard and Maritime Transportation
  - Subcommittee on Railroads, Pipelines and Hazardous Materials
- Committee on Oversight and Government Reform (Chair)
  - Subcommittee on Domestic Policy.
  - Subcommittee on Federal Workforce, Post Office, and District of Columbia.
- Select Committee on Benghazi (Ranking Minority Member 114th Congress)

In December 2010, Edolphus Towns announced that he would not seek the position of ranking minority member of the Oversight Committee in the next Congress, even though his seniority and service as chair would typically result in his filling this post. Reportedly, Towns withdrew because of a lack of support from Nancy Pelosi who feared that he would not be a sufficiently aggressive leader of Democrats in an anticipated struggle with incoming committee chair Republican Darrell Issa. Reportedly, the White House also wanted Towns to be replaced. Cummings defeated Carolyn Maloney in a vote of the House Democratic Caucus.

In his role as chair of the Oversight Committee, Cummings presided over the first public testimony by President Trump's former lawyer, Michael Cohen, and was a leading figure in the impeachment inquiry against Donald Trump. Carolyn Maloney was named acting chair by Speaker Nancy Pelosi, and won the subsequent election in the Democratic caucus to serve as permanent chair.

=== Caucus memberships ===
- Task Force on Health Care Reform
- Co-founder and Chairman of the Congressional Caucus on Drug Policy
- Congressional Arts Caucus
- Afterschool Caucuses

Cummings was a member of the Congressional Progressive Caucus. He served as chairman of the Congressional Black Caucus during the 108th United States Congress.

Cummings received praise following the congressional panel hearings on steroids in 2008. While investigating the use of steroids in sports, the panel called numerous baseball players to testify, including former single season home run record holder Mark McGwire. After McGwire answered many questions in a vague fashion, Cummings demanded to know if he was "taking the Fifth", referring to the Fifth Amendment. McGwire responded by saying, "I am here to talk about the future, not about the past." The exchange came to epitomize the entire inquiry.

=== Legislation ===
Cummings introduced the Presidential and Federal Records Act Amendments of 2014, a bipartisan bill signed into law by then-President Barack Obama in December 2014. The bill, which Cummings co-sponsored with Representative Darrell Issa, (R-California), is a set of amendments to the Federal Records Act and Presidential Records Act. Among other provisions, the bill modernizes the definition of a federal record to expressly include electronic documents.

He supported the Smart Savings Act, a bill that would make the default investment in the Thrift Savings Plan (TSP) an age-appropriate target date asset allocation investment fund (L Fund) instead of the Government Securities Investment Fund (G Fund). Cummings called the bill a "commonsense change" and argued that the bill "will enable workers to take full advantage of a diversified fund designed to yield higher returns".

He introduced the All Circuit Review Extension Act, a bill that would extend for three years the authority for federal employees who appeal a judgment of the Merit Systems Protection Board (MSPB) to file their appeal at any U.S. circuit court of appeals, instead of only the U.S. Court of Appeals for the DC Circuit. Cummings said that this program is important to extend because it "allows whistleblowers to file appeals where they live rather than being limited to the Federal Circuit Court of Appeals". He also said that the Federal Circuit Court of Appeals has "an abysmal track record in whistleblower cases".

In remarks at the 2016 Democratic National Convention, Cummings declared: "Our party does not just believe, but understands, that Black Lives Matter. But we also recognize that our community and our law enforcement work best when they work together."

=== Tenure ===
Rep. Cummings was shown to be very passionate and dedicated in his beliefs, and could often be seen becoming emotional in public as a result. Cummings was seemingly very agreeable as well. According to many, Cummings would often befriend members of the Republican Party, and was highly respected by both sides of the aisle.

== Political campaigns ==
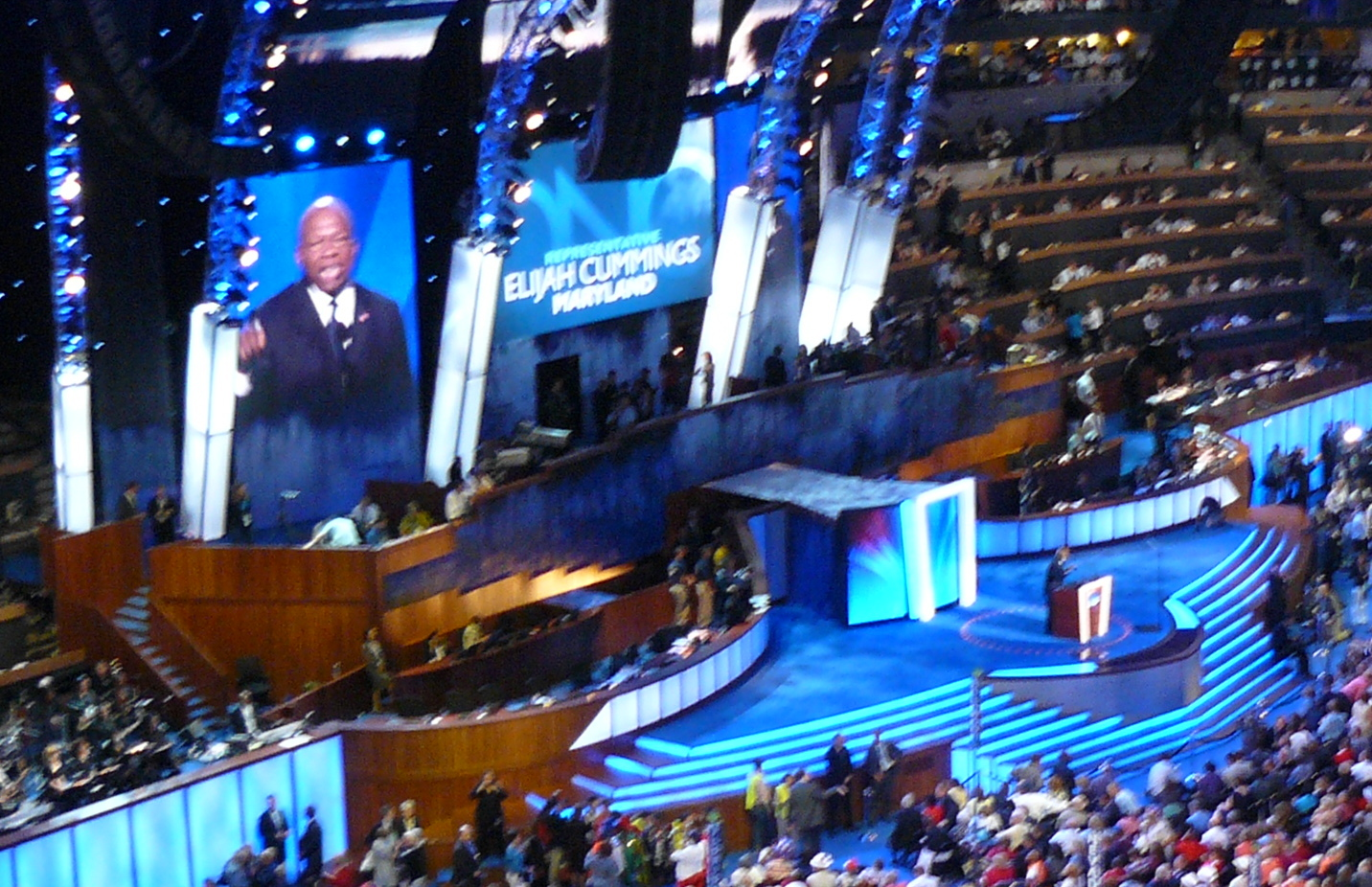
Cummings speaking at the 2008 Democratic National Convention

The five-term Congressman for Maryland's 7th congressional district, Kweisi Mfume, resigned in February 1996 to take the presidency of the NAACP. Cummings won a crowded twenty-seven-way Democratic primary—the real contest in this heavily Democratic, black-majority district—with 37.5% of the vote. In the special election, he defeated Republican Kenneth Kondner with over 80 percent of the vote. He defeated Kondner again in November by a similar margin to win the seat in his own right.

He was reelected 11 more times in the contests which followed, never dropping below 69 percent of the vote. He ran unopposed in 2006.

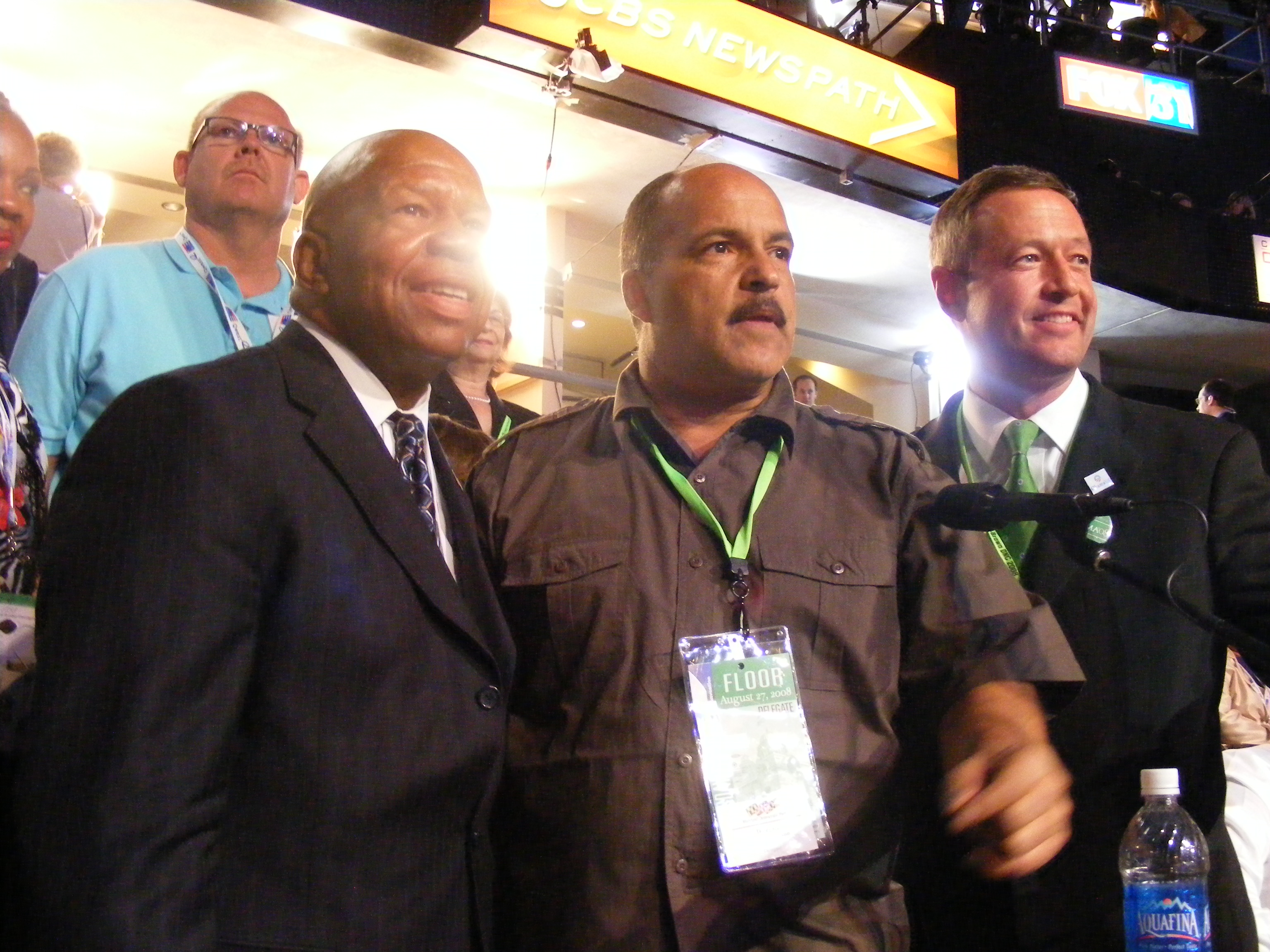
Congressman Elijah Cummings (l-r) along with Maryland Delegate Curt Anderson and Maryland Governor Martin O'Malley at the 2008 Democratic National Convention in Denver.

=== Obama campaign ===
Early in 2007, Cummings began campaigning for Barack Obama's presidential bid, attempting to solidify Obama's support in the African American community. Early in 2008, Obama remained relatively unknown and Congressional Black Caucus support was split with Hillary Clinton. Cummings traveled extensively to campaign for Obama.

== Electoral history ==
Maryland's 7th congressional district: Results 1996–2018

Year	Type	Winner	Party	Votes	%	Opponent	Party	Votes	%	Opponent	Party	Votes	%
1996	Special	✓ Elijah Cummings	Democratic	18,870	80.9%	Kenneth Kondner	Republican	4,449	19.1%				
1996	General	✓ Elijah Cummings	Democratic	115,764	83.5%	Kenneth Kondner	Republican	22,929	16.5%				
1998	General	✓ Elijah Cummings	Democratic	112,699	85.7%	Kenneth Kondner	Republican	18,742	14.3%				
2000	General	✓ Elijah Cummings	Democratic	134,066	87.0%	Kenneth Kondner	Republican	19,773	12.8%				
2002	General	✓ Elijah Cummings	Democratic	137,047	73.5%	Joseph E. Ward	Republican	49,172	26.4%				
2004	General	✓ Elijah Cummings	Democratic	179,189	73.4%	Tony Salazar	Republican	60,102	24.6%	Virginia Rodino	Green	4,727	1.9%
2006	General	✓ Elijah Cummings	Democratic	158,830	98.1%					Write-in candidates		3,147	1.9%
2008	General	✓ Elijah Cummings	Democratic	227,379	79.5%	Michael Hargadon	Republican	53,147	18.6%	Ronald Owens-Bey	Libertarian	5,214	1.8%
2010	General	✓ Elijah Cummings	Democratic	152,669	75.2%	Frank Mirabile	Republican	46,375	22.8%	Scott Spencer	Libertarian	3,814	1.9%
2012	General	✓ Elijah Cummings	Democratic	247,770	76.5%	Frank Mirabile	Republican	67,405	20.8%	Ronald Owens-Bey	Libertarian	8,211	2.5%
2014	General	✓ Elijah Cummings	Democratic	144,639	69.9%	Corrogan Vaughn	Republican	55,860	27.0%	Scott Soffen	Libertarian	6,103	3.0%
2016	General	✓ Elijah Cummings	Democratic	238,838	74.9%	Corrogan Vaughn	Republican	69,556	21.8%	Miles B. Hoenig	Green	9,715	3.0%
2018	General	✓ Elijah Cummings	Democratic	202,345	76.4%	Richmond Davis	Republican	56,266	21.3%	David Griggs	Libertarian	5,827	2.2%

== Personal life ==
Cummings lived in the Madison Park community in Baltimore and was an active member of the New Psalmist Baptist Church. He married Joyce Matthews, with whom he had a daughter, Jennifer J. Cummings. He had a son and a daughter, Adia Cummings, from other relationships. He married Maya Rockeymoore Cummings in 2009, who was elected chairwoman of the Maryland Democratic Party in December 2018.

In June 2011, his nephew Christopher Cummings, son of his brother James, was murdered at his off-campus house near Old Dominion University in Norfolk, Virginia, where he was a student. On August 12, 2021, Norfolk Police charged four men with the murder.

Cummings underwent surgery to repair his aortic valve in May 2017 and was absent from Capitol Hill for two months. In July 2017, he developed a surgery-related infection but returned to work. Cummings was later hospitalized for a knee infection.

Cummings was diagnosed with a rare form of cancer called thymic carcinoma in 1994 while serving as a member of the Maryland House of Delegates. It was revealed in November 2019 that Cummings had lived with the cancer for 25 years, though it was not stated as the cause of death.

=== Death ===
External videos
- Elijah Cummings funeral service, New Psalmist Baptist Church, Baltimore, October 25, 2019, C-SPAN

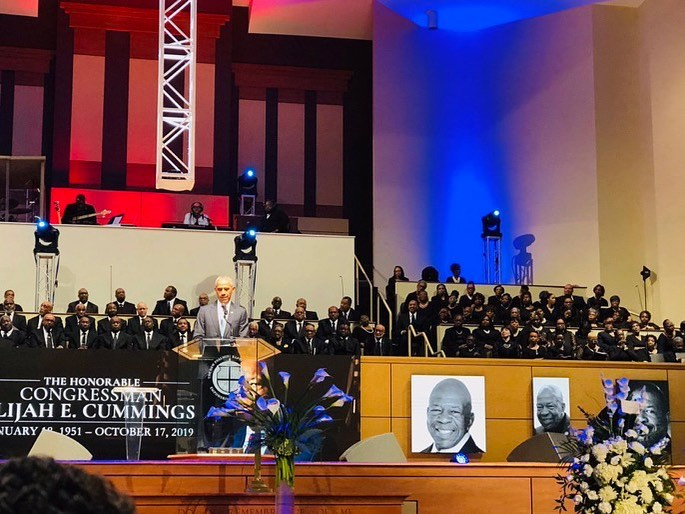
Barack Obama speaking at the funeral of Elijah Cummings.

Elijah Cummings died on October 17, 2019, at Johns Hopkins Hospital at the age of 68 from "complications concerning longstanding health challenges", his spokeswoman stated. Before his funeral service on October 25 at Baltimore's New Psalmist Baptist Church, where he was a member for 40 years, Cummings lay in state at the U.S. Capitol Building's Statuary Hall on October 24.

Cummings is the first African American lawmaker to achieve the honor of lying in state at the nation's Capitol. Prior to his death, the most recent people to lie in state were former senator John McCain and former president George H. W. Bush. Following a state funeral which was attended by family and members of Congress, thousands of public mourners were seen entering the U.S. Capitol to see his casket and received greetings from his widow, Maya Rockeymoore-Cummings. His casket departed from the U.S. Capitol at around 8:35 p.m.

On October 25, 2019, the official funeral for Cummings was held at the New Psalmist Baptist Church in Baltimore. Many political figures of the Democratic Party, including former Presidents Barack Obama and Bill Clinton, former Secretary of State Hillary Clinton, House Speaker Nancy Pelosi, Joe Biden, John Lewis, Amy Klobuchar, Elizabeth Warren, Alexandria Ocasio-Cortez, and his predecessor Kweisi Mfume (who then became his successor) attended the funeral service. His friend and long time pastor Bishop Walter S. Thomas, Sr. performed the eulogy.

== Political positions ==
=== Healthcare ===
Cummings was in favor of single-payer healthcare. While he supported the Affordable Care Act, he believed that the legislation should have added a public option.

=== Marijuana ===
Cummings believed that marijuana should be legalized and taxed at the same rate as alcohol.

== Honors and awards ==
Cummings was awarded many honors and awards in recognition of his political career. These include:

=== Honorary degrees ===
- Cummings received 13 honorary doctoral degrees from universities across the United States, most recently an honorary doctorate of public service from the University of Maryland, College Park in 2017.

Honorary degrees

Location	Date	School	Degree
District of Columbia	2003	Howard University	Doctor of Laws (LL.D)
Maryland	2006	Morgan State University	Doctor of Laws (LL.D)
Maryland	2007	Goucher College	Doctorate
Maryland	2014	Maryland Institute College of Art	Doctorate
Maryland	2015	Johns Hopkins University	Doctor of Humane Letters (DHL)
Maryland	December 20, 2017	University of Maryland, College Park	Doctor of Public Service

== See also ==
- List of African-American United States representatives
- List of members of the United States Congress who died in office (2000–present)#2010s

U.S. House of Representatives
Preceded by Kweisi Mfume	Member of the U.S. House of Representatives from Maryland's 7th congressional district 1996–2019	Succeeded by Kweisi Mfume
Preceded by Eddie Bernice Johnson	Chair of the Congressional Black Caucus; 2003–2005	Succeeded by Mel Watt
Preceded by Trey Gowdy	Chair of the House Oversight Committee; 2019	Succeeded by Carolyn Maloney
