= Smart Savings Act =

United States law

- Long title: To amend title 5, United States Code, to change the default investment fund under the Thrift Savings Plan, and for other purposes.
- Announced in: the 113th United States Congress
- Sponsored by: Rep. Darrell E. Issa (R, CA-49)
- Number of co-sponsors: 5

Codification
- U.S.C. sections affected: 5 U.S.C. § 8438, 5 U.S.C. § 8439, 5 U.S.C. § 8472, 5 U.S.C. § 8440e, 5 U.S.C. § 8401, and others.

Legislative history
- Introduced in the House as H.R. 4193 by Rep. Darrell E. Issa (R, CA-49) on March 11, 2014; Committee consideration by United States House Committee on Oversight and Government Reform; Passed the House on July 14, 2014; Passed the Senate on December 10, 2014; Signed into law by President Barack Obama on December 18, 2014

The Smart Savings Act (H.R. 4193) (Public Law No: 113-255) made the default investment in the Thrift Savings Plan (TSP) an age-appropriate target date asset allocation investment fund (L Fund) instead of the Government Securities Investment Fund (G Fund).

The bill was introduced into the United States House of Representatives during the 113th United States Congress. A similar bill, S. 2117, was introduced into the United States Senate.

== Background ==
Federal workers are automatically enrolled in the G Fund when they sign up, a fund that "is very safe," it is simultaneously "widely viewed by investment professionals as an overly conservative investment, particularly for younger workers, and can leave many unprepared for retirement."

Since August 2010, the Thrift Savings Plan has automatically enrolled all new federal employees to put 3% of their basic pay in the G Fund, unless the employee opted out. Employees get a match of 3% plus a 1% contribution from whatever agency they work at.

== Provisions of the bill ==
This summary is based largely on the summary provided by the Congressional Research Service, a public domain source.

The Smart Savings Act would make the default investment in the Thrift Savings Plan (TSP) an age-appropriate target date asset allocation investment fund (L Fund), instead of the Government Securities Investment Fund (G Fund), if no election has been made for the investment of available funds. The bill would retain the Government Securities Investment Fund as the default fund for members of the uniformed services. The bill would require TSP participants whose default fund is an age-appropriate L Fund to sign a risk acknowledgement prior to enrollment.

== Congressional Budget Office report ==
This summary is based largely on the summary provided by the Congressional Budget Office, as ordered reported by House Committee on Oversight and Government Reform on March 12, 2014. This is a public domain source.

H.R. 4193 would change the default investment fund in the Thrift Savings Plan (TSP) for government employees. Currently, contributions of employees who are enrolled in the TSP, but have not specified where to invest their funds, are automatically invested in the Government Securities Investment Fund. This bill would shift the default fund to a Lifecycle fund with an age-appropriate asset allocation.

The Congressional Budget Office (CBO) estimates that enacting H.R. 4193 would not affect direct spending. The Joint Committee on Taxation (JCT) estimates that there could be a small revenue effect because enacting the bill might change the number of federal employees who choose to contribute to the TSP, thus modifying their total tax liability. Therefore, pay-as-you-go procedures apply. However, JCT estimates that any revenue effects would be negligible.

H.R. 4193 contains no intergovernmental or private-sector mandates as defined in the Unfunded Mandates Reform Act and would impose no costs on state, local, or tribal governments.

== Procedural history ==
The Smart Savings Act was introduced into the United States House of Representatives on March 11, 2014 by Rep. Darrell E. Issa (R, CA-49). The bill was referred to the United States House Committee on Oversight and Government Reform. On June 30, 2014, it was reported alongside House Report 113-507.

== Debate and discussion ==
Rep. Issa, who introduced the bill, said that the bill "will ensure that workers who are planning ahead for retirement are investing in an account that works for them at every stage of their career." According to Issa, the current "default fund is comprised of government securities, which historically provide very low returns."

Rep. Elijah Cummings (D-MD) also supported the bill, calling it a "commonsense change" and arguing that the bill "will enable workers to take full advantage of a diversified fund designed to yield higher returns."

== See also ==
- List of bills in the 113th United States Congress
