= William Brinkley (Underground Railroad) =

American Underground Railroad conductor

William Brinkley (c. 1814 – January 5, 1887) was a conductor on the Underground Railroad who helped more than 100 people achieve freedom by traveling from Camden, Delaware, past the "notoriously dangerous" towns of Dover and Smyrna north to Blackbird and sometimes as far as Wilmington, which was also very dangerous for runaway enslaved people. Some of his key rescues include the Tilly Escape of 1856, the Dover Eight in the spring of 1857, and the rescue of 28 people, more than half of which were children, from Dorchester County, Maryland. He had a number of pathways that he would take to various destinations, aided by his brother Nathaniel and Abraham Gibbs, other conductors on the railroad.

== Biography ==
William was a laborer and a farmer, born about 1813 or 1814 in Delaware. He was married to Ann, also called Annie, born about 1820 in Delaware. They had two children, Malaki who was born about 1835 and Henrietta who was born about 1842. They lived in Camden in Kent County, Delaware, next door to his younger brother Nathaniel Brinkley, who was married to Sarah and had two children, Elizabeth Brinkley and John Brown. Their granddaughter Rebecca Warner, a six-year-old girl born in Pennsylvania, lived with William and his wife in 1870 and 1880.

At the age of 72, William Blinkly, a laborer from Camden, died in Kent County, Delaware, on January 5, 1887. His parents were not stated.

== Underground Railroad ==
William Brinkley led freedom seekers on paths from Camden to various northerly destinations

He lived at Brinkley Hill, named after the Brinkley family, was a black community near northeast Camden, Delaware, off State Route 13. Camden was known to be a "notoriously dangerous place for runaways," Brinkley Hill was a stop on the network that led freedom seekers north, using different pathways. Brinkley guided people north to Blackbird, Dover, New Castle, Odessa, Smyrna, or Wilmington.

When Harriet Tubman came into the area, she stayed at Brinkley's residence. Abraham (formerly Abel) Gibbs and Nathaniel Brinkley, William's brother, risked their lives to lead fugitive slaves along the Underground Railroad. Tubman mentioned that she felt "safe and comfortable" with Gibbs and the Brinkley brothers.

Brinkley wrote letters that told of the life of the slavery and experiences being an operator on the Underground Railroad. In 1849, he and others from Brinkley Hill wrote a letter to the Delaware state legislature about laws that restricted the movements of free blacks in and out of the state. Besides Tubman, Brinkley also worked with other key people of the Underground Railroad, Thomas Garrett and William Still.

=== The Tilly Escape ===
In the fall of 1856, Brinkley helped Harriet Tubman and an enslaved woman named Tilly travel north in what was called the Tilly Escape. The women had taken a steamboat from Baltimore to Seaford, Delaware, where they were nearly captured. The women were able to make it to Camden. From there, Brinkley led them to Wilmington, Delaware.

=== Dover Eight ===
In March 1857, he helped the Dover Eight travel to Philadelphia (in a free state). The Dover Eight were betrayed by Thomas Otwell, a conductor on the railroad, and were nearly captured at the Dover jail, which could have resulted in payment of $3,000 (equivalent to $103,661 in 2025) to Otwell and his conspirators. Six of the Dover Eight returned to Camden and persuaded Otwell to bring them to William Brinkley as originally planned. Brinkley brought them past Dover and Smyrna and then safely taken out of Delaware due to guidance by Thomas Garrett and other Underground Railroad operatives. Brinkley wrote of six who had returned to Camden:

We put them through, we have to carry them 19 miles and come back the same night which makes 38 miles. It is too much for our little horses. We must do the best we can, there is much Business done on this Road. We have to go through Dover and Smyrna, the two worst places this side of the Maryland line.

— Letter to a member of the Philadelphia Vigilance Committee from William Brinkley, March 23, 1857

=== Group of Dorchester families ===
In a remarkable escape the rainy night of October 24, 1857, when two dozen people escaped from six Dorchester County, Maryland, enslavers. Nearly all of Samuel Pattison's bondspeople had run away. The event is notable because of the size of the group of people, who traveled with infants and other children, through days of heavy rains. Over the first three days it rained heavily and their group grew to 28 people when Marshall Dutton, George and Solomon Light, and Silas Long joined them. They prepared for run-ins with slave capturers by carrying pistols, knives, and other weapons.

It was a group of 28 freedom seekers, including seventeen children and two infants, who met up with Brinkley and his associates who took them north to Centreville in the Wilmington area. In an effort to outrun any slave catchers, Brinkley drove his carriage too fast and it broke down and the horse was injured. The group, especially the children, were exhausted, cold, hungry and ill. Some of the people were barefoot. Word got to Thomas Garrett by the 31st that most of the group was in Centreville, which he relayed to William Still. There was a 14-year-old-boy who became separated from the rest of the group. The fugitives split into smaller groups and went to a number of places outside of Philadelphia. They pushed through unusually heavy snowstorms throughout November. Most of the group made it to St. Catharines, Ontario, Canada.

=== Other Delaware conductors ===
Besides Brinkley, there were a number of black Underground Railroad conductors in Delaware: Samuel Burris, Harry Craige, Joseph Hamilton, Evan Lewis, Davey Moore, Comegys Munson, Severn Johnson, Abraham Shadd, Joseph G. Walker, and George Wilmer. The white conductors were John Alston, Daniel Corbit, Isaac S. Flint, Daniel Gibbons, John Hunn, Benjamin Webb, Thomas Webb, William Webb, all under the leadership of Thomas Garrett.

== School trustee ==
Brinkley was one of five trustees of a school that was built in Camden with the assistance of the Delaware Association and the Freedmen's Bureau. The school sat on land that adjoined his brother Nathaniel's property and along the road from Camden to Dover. His brother, President of the Camden Colored Lincoln Union League, requested the establishment of a school on February 23, 1867. The 22' by 36' wood-framed schoolhouse was completed that year.
