= Orchard Street United Methodist Church =

Historic church in Maryland, United States

- U.S. National Register of Historic Places
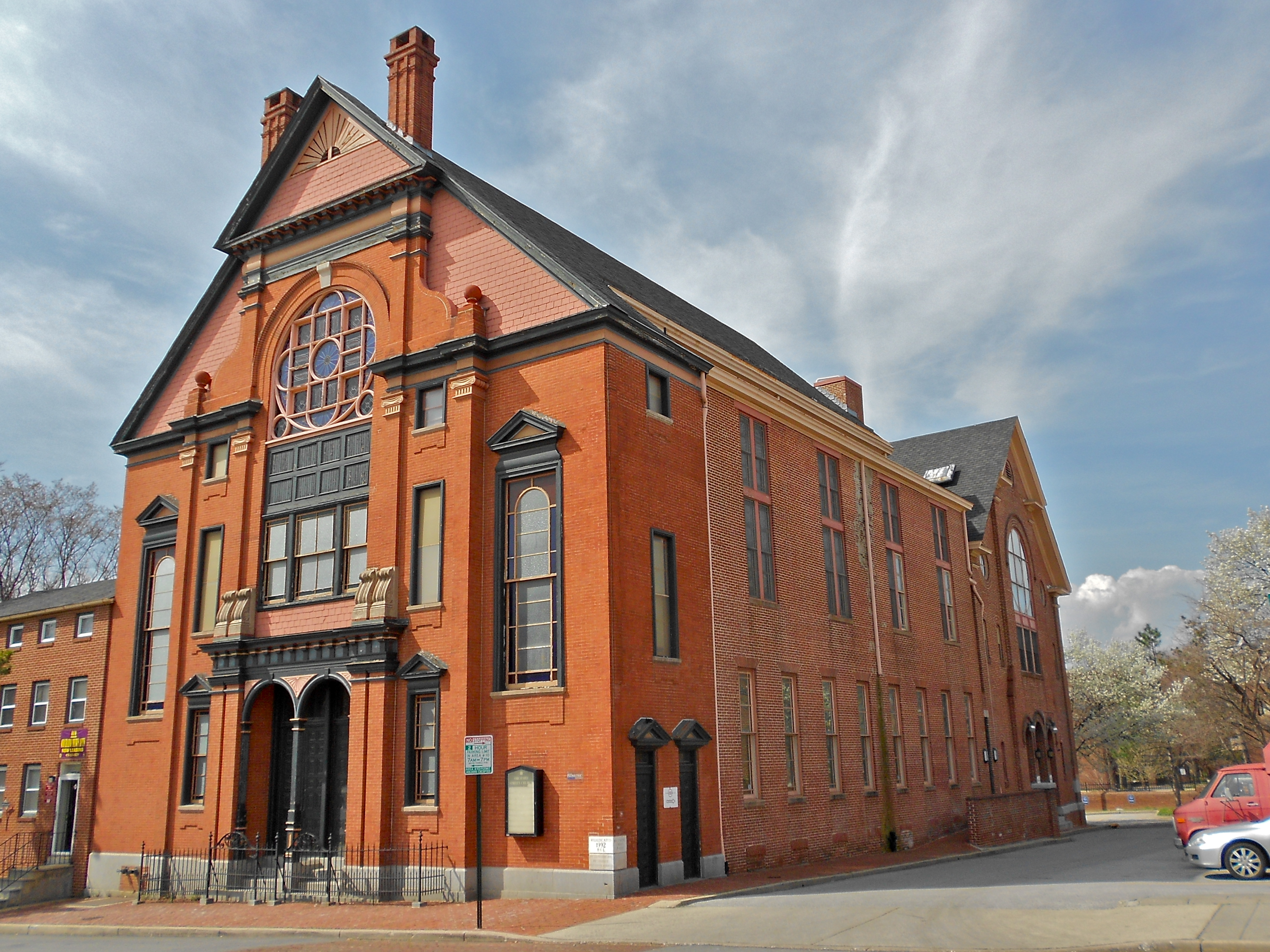
- Orchard Street United Methodist Church, March 2012

- Location within Baltimore Location within Maryland Location within the United States
- Location: 510-512 Orchard St., Baltimore, Maryland
- Coordinates: 39°17′51″N 76°37′28″W
- Area: less than one acre
- Built: 1837
- Architectural style: Renaissance, Romanesque, Italian Renaissance
- NRHP reference No.: 75002096
- Added to NRHP: November 12, 1975

Orchard Street United Methodist Church, formerly known as Metropolitan Methodist Episcopal Church, is a historic Methodist Episcopal church located at Baltimore, Maryland, United States. It is a church built in a mixture of revival styles. It was constructed in 1837, with additions made in 1853, 1865, and 1882. The main church is Romanesque Revival, but the rear building is Romanesque with a large Gothic window in its northeastern facade. The nave is approximately 54 by 75 feet (16 by 23 m) and features clerestory windows. The rear building is approximately 50 by 75 feet (15 by 23 m). The church was founded in 1825 by Truman Le Pratt, a West Indian former slave of Governor John Eager Howard. It now houses the offices of the Baltimore Urban League and is the oldest standing structure built by African Americans in the city of Baltimore.

Orchard Street United Methodist Church was listed on the National Register of Historic Places in 1975. The church houses an historic 1890 Niemann pipe organ.

Lena King Lee saved the church from demolition during her time in the Maryland House of Delegates.
