= Harriet Tubman's family =

Family of American abolitionist

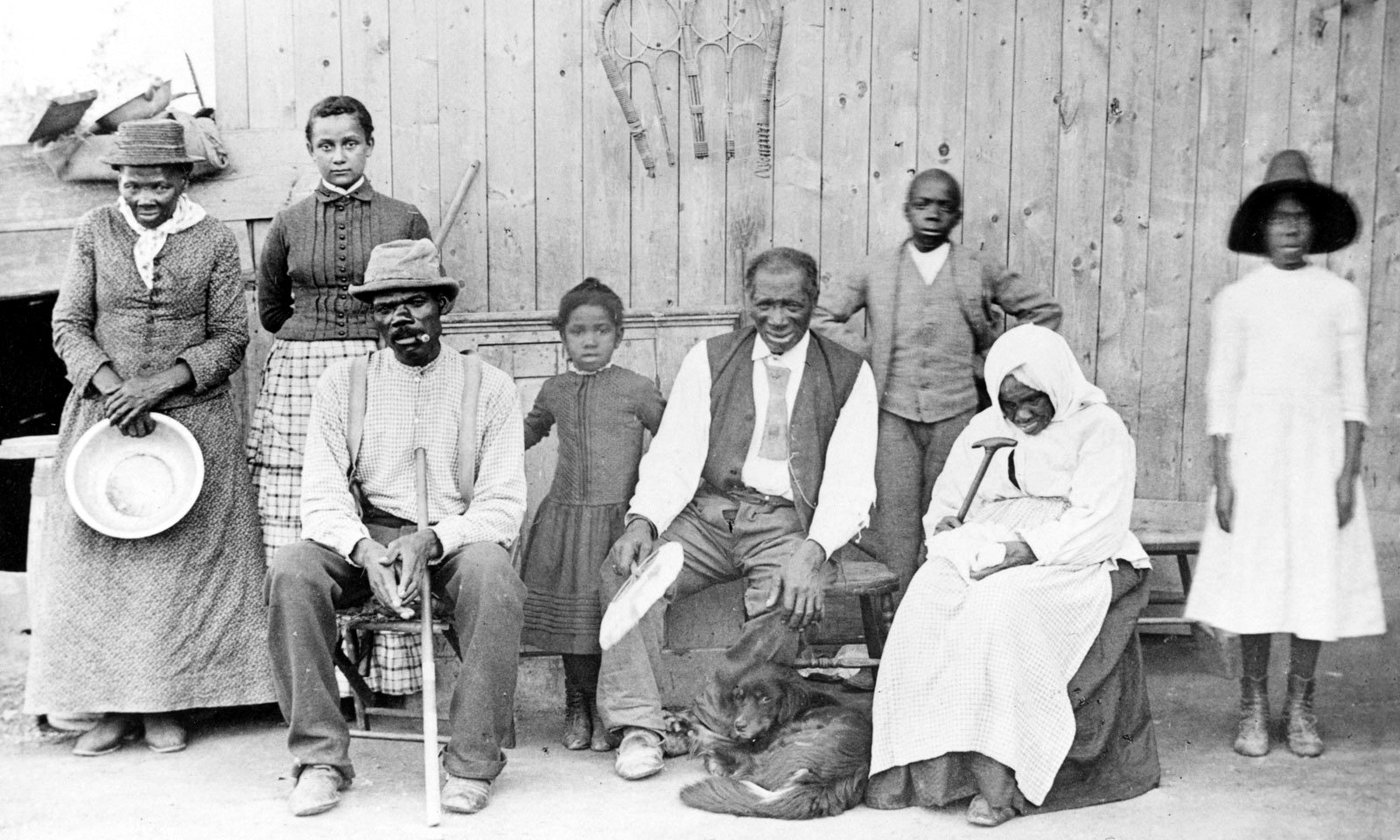
Harriet Tubman, far left, with family and neighbors, circa 1887, at her home in Auburn, NY. Left to right: Harriet Tubman; Gertie Davis (adopted daughter); Nelson Davis (husband); Lee Chaney (neighbor's child); "Pop" John Alexander (elderly boarder in Tubman's home); Walter Green (neighbor's child); Blind "Aunty" Sarah Parker (elderly boarder); Dora Stewart (great-niece and granddaughter of Tubman's brother Robert Ross aka John Stewart).

Harriet Tubman (1822–1913) was an American abolitionist and political activist. Tubman escaped slavery and rescued approximately 700 enslaved people, including members of her family and friends. Harriet Tubman's family includes her birth family, her two husbands, John Tubman and Nelson Davis, and her adopted daughter, Gertie Davis.

Tubman's parents—Ben Ross and Harriett "Rit" Gene Ross—were enslaved by two different families. Their lives came together when Mary Pattison Broadness, Rita's enslaver, married Anthony Thompson. Ben Ross, enslaved by Thompson, met and married Rit Greene. They lived together until about 1823 or 1824 when Rit and their children went to the Brodess farm. Ben was a timber estimator and foreman, and Rit was a domestic servant. After Ben was freed, he bought his wife's freedom. Ben was a conductor on the Underground Railroad, and enslavers became suspicious of his role in escapes in the area. Tubman, having freed other family members, rescued her parents. After a short period in St. Catharines in Ontario, Canada, Tubman and her parents settled in the Auburn, New York area.

Tubman married a free man, John Tubman (1844-1851) , in 1844. In 1849, Tubman fled the area, believing she would be sold. She returned to the area to bring John Tubman north, but he had already married another woman. Tubman operated a boarding house out of her home in Auburn, and Nelson Davis boarded with her for three years before they were married in 1869. Davis fought during the American Civil War. They adopted a girl, Gertie, and operated several businesses out of their farm. They raised pigs and chickens, operating a farm selling eggs and butter. Nelson Davis and Harriet Tubman were Married from 1869-1888

Tubman made 13 trips to Maryland to bring back her brothers, parents, other family members, friends, and others. Tubman did not know of the whereabouts of her sisters, except Rachel, who was separated from her children and died before the family could be reunited. She did not have any biological children.

== Background ==
Family members of enslaved people were often spread out over a distance. Sometimes, it was because they were sold to other enslavers; in other cases, because their enslaver had multiple properties and rotated enslaved people across several residences. Sometimes, enslaved people were hired out for work. Enslavers also enslaved the children of enslaved women. In the case of Harriet Tubman's family members, enslavers changed their lives at will. Their enslavers were the white Brodess, Pattison, Stewart, and Thompson families of the Eastern Shore of Maryland.

Anthony Thompson married Mary Pattison Brodess, bringing enslaved people together from their families. Edward Brodess, son of Mary, became Thompson's stepson. Around the time of Tubman's birth, there was a conflict in the family over a house in Bucktown that Anthony Thompson built for Edward when he reached 21. Edward did not pay for the construction, and Thompson sued him in 1823. Brodess counter-sued, stating that he did not like the house. The case dragged on into 1827, mostly because Brodess did not appear in court. But Brodess ultimately won the case. In the meantime, in 1823 or 1824, Brodess claimed enslavement of Rit and her children and had them brought over to the Brodess farm, separating Ben from his family.

== Ben and Rit Greene Ross ==
Born Araminta "Minty" Ross, her parents were Benjamin "Ben" and Harriet "Rit" Greene Ross. They were "respected as clever, honest, and religious people with a strong sense of family loyalty".

=== Ben ===
Ross family sites in Maryland. Ben lived at Peters Neck, and Rit and five children also lived there for a while. Rit and her children lived at Brodess Farm beginning about 1824. Ben later lived at Poplar Neck, and Rit joined him there after he purchased her freedom around 1854.

Around 1785 or 1787, Benjamin Ross was born in Dorchester County, Maryland, the property of wealthy landowner Anthony Thompson, who married Mary Pattison in 1803. She enslaved Rit Greene. Ben and Rit were married in 1808 through an informal marital ceremony, which was their only option to commit to one another.

Ben was a lumberman who supervised enslaved people and brought down poplar, oak, and cypress trees; he then transported them to Baltimore, where they were used to build ships. In the late 1830s and early 1840s, Ben and Tubman both worked on digging canals for Lewis and John T. Stewart, who were shipbuilders.

Anthony Thompson died in 1836. In the early 1840s, Ben was emancipated and received 10 acres of land following Anthony Thompson's death, as stipulated in his will. Thompson's son, Dr. Anthony C. Thompson, a "timber magnate" and a physician, inherited the estate. He also owned Poplar Neck, an area in southern Caroline County where Thompson sent free laborers and enslaved people. Poplar Neck is approximately 35 miles from Peters Neck, where Tubman was born. Ben once said that Dr. Thompson was "a rough man towards his slaves, and declared, that he had not given him a dollar since the death of his father". He ultimately sold his 10 acres to Dr. Thompson.

He continued to work as a foreman and lumber estimator by hiring himself out within the Eastern Shore for $5 (equivalent to $173 in 2025) a day. He saved his earnings to buy his wife's freedom.

He was a conductor on the Underground Railroad, which included hiding people on his property in Caroline County. The increase in successful escapes drew the attention of local law enforcement in 1857. He was seen as a "primary agitator", such as with the escape of the Dover Eight, which led to Ben and Rit's trip north to avoid retribution. They initially moved to St. Catharines, Ontario in Canada, but the climate was too cold for the 70-year-old couple, and they then moved to Fleming outside of Auburn, New York.

=== Rit ===
Rit was born about 1785 or 1787 in Dorchester County, Maryland. Atthow Pattison enslaved Rit and her mother Modesty who lived on his 265-acre farm near Blackwater National Wildlife Refuge east of the convergence of the Blackwater and Little Blackwater Rivers. Tubman believed that Modesty had arrived in the colonies on a ship from Africa. Her grandmother may have come from the area now known as Ghana on West Africa's Gold Coast. People of that area are of the Akan ethnic group. In 1791, Modesty does not appear in Pattison's will.

In January 1797, Pattison died and left Rit to his granddaughter Mary Pattison, who was the wife of Joseph Brodess. (Note: Schraff said that when Rit was about ten years old, she went with her mother to the plantation of Edward Brodas.) There was a stipulation in Pattison's will that she and her children should be freed when they reached forty-five years of age. In 1803, Mary Pattison Brodess married Anthony Thompson, who had an enslaved man named Benjamin Ross. She died in 1809, and her son Edward inherited her estate. where she worked as a domestic servant. Edward sold her daughter Linah. He attempted to sell her son Moses to a slave trader from Georgia, but Rit traded off hiding him in the woods and her cabin until the trader gave up and left.

Edward Brodess decided not to honor the stipulation in Pattison's will that would have freed Rit and her children at the age of 45. Edward died in 1849. Eliza Ann Brodess inherited her husband Edward's estate. Edward and then his wife, Eliza Ann, hired Rit out and kept the money that Tubman earned. Gorney Pattison, great-grandson of Atthow, filed a lawsuit against Brodess for the monies she earned since she and her husband had not honored Atthow Pattison's wishes. Pattison lost the case.

Ben purchased his wife's freedom from Eliza Ann Brodess for $20 (equivalent to $691 in 2025) in 1854 or 1855, and the bill of sale was recorded on June 11, 1855, at the Dorchester County Court. Rit was not manumitted because a law of Maryland did not permit enslaved people over age 45 to be set free. She then lived at Ben's cabin in Caroline County.

=== Freedom in New York ===
Fearing that she would be sold away from Maryland, Tubman ran away in 1849. She followed the "north star" and was aided by white and black people to make her way north. Her parents were among the people that she brought north and out of slavery. They escaped with Tubman in 1857.

I had crossed the line of which I had so long been dreaming. I was free; but there was no one to welcome me to the land of freedom, I was a stranger in a strange land, and my home after all was down in the old cabin quarter with the old folks, and my brothers and sisters. But to this solemn resolution I came: I was free and they should be free also. I would make a home for them in the North, and the Lord helping me, I would bring democracy all here.

— Harriet Tubman (Note: Content as it was stated in the source: I had crossed de line of which I had so long been dreaming. I was free; but dere was no one to welcome me to de land of freedom, I was a stranger in a strange land, and my home after all was down in de old cabin quarter wid de ole folks, and my brothers and sisters. But to dis solemn resolution I came: I was free and dey should be free also. I would make a home for dem in de North, and de Lord helping me, I would bring democracy all here.)

Tubman arrived in Caroline County, Maryland, with a horse and a makeshift wagon to pick up her parents and the belongings they most treasured on their trip north. They traveled at night to a train that took them to Wilmington, Delaware, where they waited for Harriet at the home of Thomas Garrett. After a stop in Philadelphia to meet William Still, they headed north on a train to St. Catharines in Ontario, Canada, where Tubman had her headquarters and waited for freedom seekers.

Tubman made a meager income by chopping and selling wood and working for farmers. Her parents spent a difficult winter, subject to illnesses from the cold. William H. Seward, the governor of New York, helped arrange for the purchase of land in Auburn, New York for Tubman and her parents. Her parents lived in Auburn for the rest of their lives. When Tubman was away on Underground Railroad trips or during the American Civil War, friends looked after her parents. Ben died about 1871 in Auburn, New York. Rit died in October 1880, nearly 100 years of age.

== Siblings and other family members ==
Ben and Rit had nine children together. Dorchester County records provide the names of Harriet's four sisters: Linah (b. 1808), Mariah Ritty (b. 1811), Soph (b. 1813), and Rachel—and four brothers: Robert (b. 1816), Ben (b. 1824), Henry, and Moses. Harriet also considered two of her nieces as sisters: Harriet and Kessiah Jolley.

Edward Brodess sold three of Tubman's sisters, whom she never saw again. A trader later wanted to buy her youngest brother, Moses, but Rit was able to resist being separated from her son.

A conductor on the Underground Railroad, Tubman made 13 return trips over ten years to lead about 70 + people north, including her parents, siblings, and friends, to freedom. Her first trip was in December 1850 when her niece Kessiah and her two children were to be sold. At the auction, Kessiah was sold to her husband, John Bowley, a free black man. Before the children could be sold, the family left with Tubman for Philadelphia. Tubman led three of her brothers and others away from Peters Neck on Christmas 1854. In doing so, she took the risk of becoming enslaved again or lynched if she was caught; escaping slavery was even more risky after the passage of the Fugitive Slave Act of 1850. As a result, Tubman extended travel routes into Canada, where slavery was prohibited.

Three of Tubman's brothers worked at a plantation near a free black named Jacob Jackson. In 1854, Tubman had a letter sent to Jackson to coordinate the escape of the young men. She would look for them at her parents' home at Poplar Neck in Caroline County. The end of the letter states, "Tell my brothers to be always watching unto prayer and when the good ship of Zion comes along, to be ready to step on board." She was particularly concerned that her brothers would be sold to the Deep South.

For ten years, during multiple attempts, Tubman tried to rescue her sister, Rachel, and her children, Angerine and Ben. During those attempts, Rachel was separated from her children and would not have left without them. In late 1860, Tubman found that Rachel had died, and she was unable to rescue her niece and nephew.

Her brother John, his wife Millie, and their son Moses lived next to Tubman in Auburn. Several nieces and nephews lived in Auburn, New York.

=== Posthumous relations ===
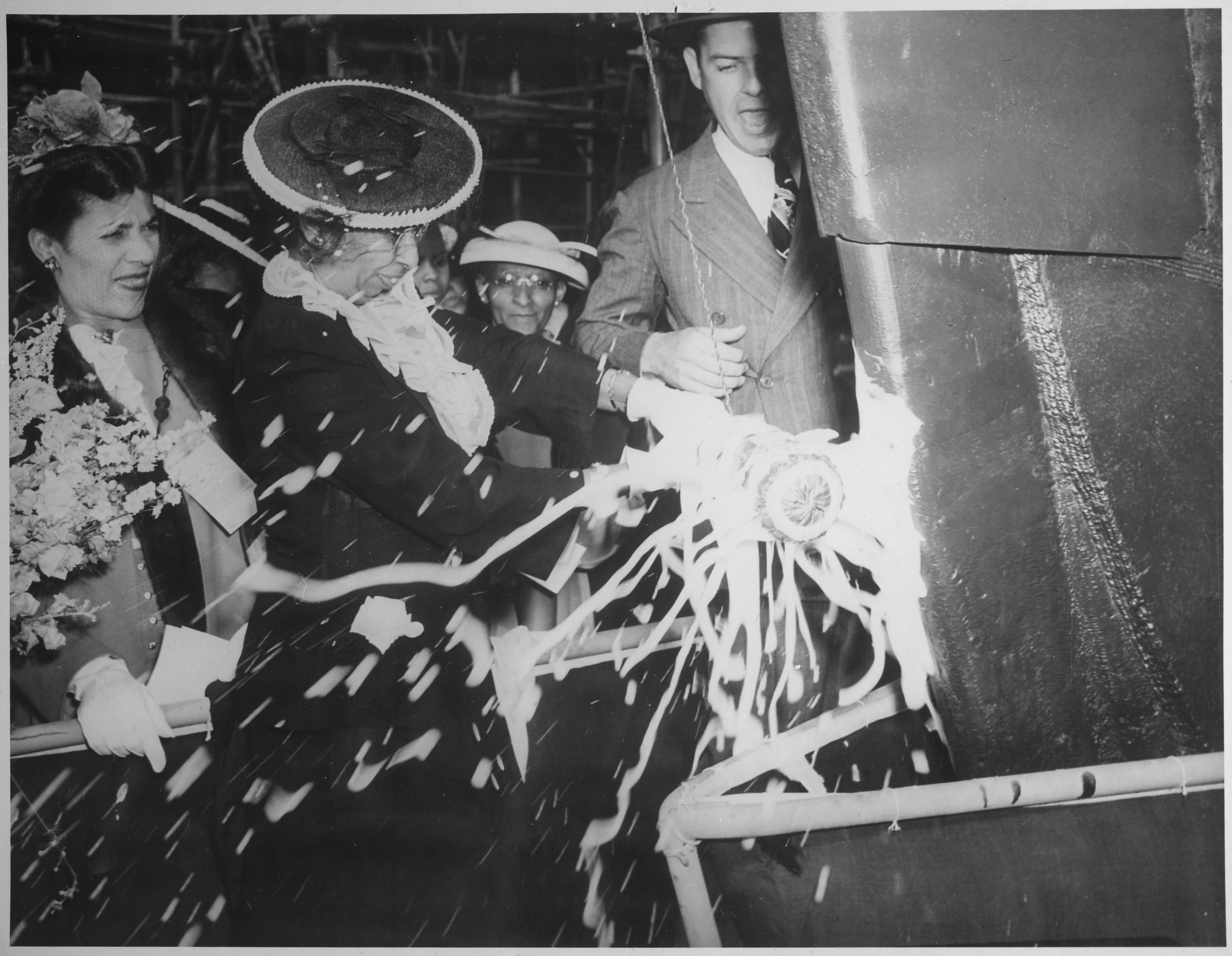
Tubman's great-niece, Eva Stewart Northrup, launching the SS Harriet Tubman

Some descendants of her siblings have worked on preserving the national memory of Tubman’s life. A great-great-great-granddaughter of her sister Soph, Ernestine "Tina" Martin Wyatt, successfully campaigned for the United States Army Military Intelligence Corps to induct Tubman into its Hall of Fame as a full member and has advocated for a Harriet Tubman Day. Wyatt participated at the November 11, 2024 ceremony in which Tubman was posthumously commissioned as a one-star general (Brigadier General) in the Maryland Army National Guard in recognition of her military service during the Civil War.

Other descendants of Soph (Sophie Stokes Brown), Joyce Stokes Jones and her daughter Michele Jones Galvin, have written a book about Tubman titled Beyond the Underground: Aunt Harriet, Moses of Her People.

== Marriages ==
=== John Tubman ===
She was married in 1844 to John Tubman, a free man. He was a neighbor of Ben Ross. Tubman had asked for permission to marry and live with John, which she received, but she was still to work for Brodess. She changed her given name about the same time, becoming Harriet Tubman. If they had any children, they would have been the property of the Brodess family. See Partus sequitur ventrem.

Realizing she was to be sold following her enslaver's death, Tubman escaped in 1849 when she was 27. She returned to lead her husband north with her, and she brought a new suit for him to wear on the trip north. However, he had married another free woman. He was killed in 1867 following a dispute with Robert Vincent, a white man, over ashes that Vincent wanted removed from a tenant's house. They fought in the morning, and Vincent chased Tubman with an axe, but he could not catch him. Later in the day, he saw Tubman and shot him in the forehead. Vincent drove on without checking Tubman's condition. Tubman was killed instantly. Vincent was arrested on November 4, 1867. He was tried, and was found not guilty. He had claimed to the all-white jury that Tubman had come after him with a club.

=== Nelson Davis ===
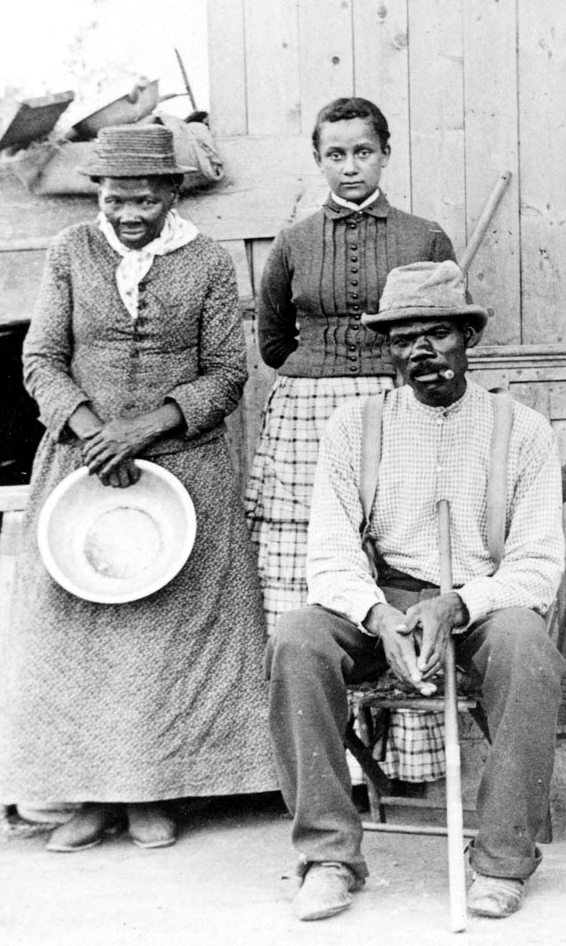
Harriet Tubman, Nelson Davis, and behind them Gertie Davis, circa 1887, at her home in Auburn, New York

Tubman established herself in Auburn, New York on land that she bought from William H. Seward in early 1859, and the house was a haven for family and friends. In 1866, Tubman met Nelson Davis from Elizabeth City when he became a boarder at her house. He lived at her house for three years, and they were married on March 18, 1869, at the Central Presbyterian Church. Davis was more than twenty years younger than Tubman. He was first known as Nelson Charles, who had worked for a Charles family (Note: In 1850, George Charles enslaved 22 people, two of whom were children, 5 and 6 years of age. This would have been his age at that time.) and probably escaped slavery by the Underground Railroad around 1861, perhaps on the Pasquotank River and the Great Dismal Swamp, which are both sites on the National Underground Railroad Network to Freedom. After he escaped, he changed his name to Nelson Davis, using the surname of his father, Milford Davis. He lived in Oneida County, New York by 1861. About 1863, he enlisted in the U.S. Army and fought during the American Civil War. At the end of the war, he was discharged in Texas. In 1874, Tubman and Davis adopted a girl named Gertie.

Tubman and Davis operated a 7-acre farm and brick business in Auburn. They raised chickens and pigs and grew potatoes, vegetables and apples. Tubman sold butter and eggs. Tubman also continued to board people. Rit Ross lived at the house, as did four boarders. Between 1882 and 1884, their frame house was burned down, and a brick building was constructed. Around that time, Davis was very ill, requiring care, and could not work. She also helped out family members in need, like her nephew John Henry Stewart's surviving wife Eliza and three children.

Davis died in 1888 of tuberculosis. Under Harriet Tubman Davis, she filed for pension benefits provided for Civil War veterans' spouses.

== Source ==
- Larson, Kate Clifford (February 19, 2009). Bound for the Promised Land: Harriet Tubman: Portrait of an American Hero. Random House Publishing Group. ISBN 978-0-307-51476-9.
