= Bucktown, Maryland =

Community in Dorchester County, Maryland

Coordinates: 38°27′33″N 76°01′51″W

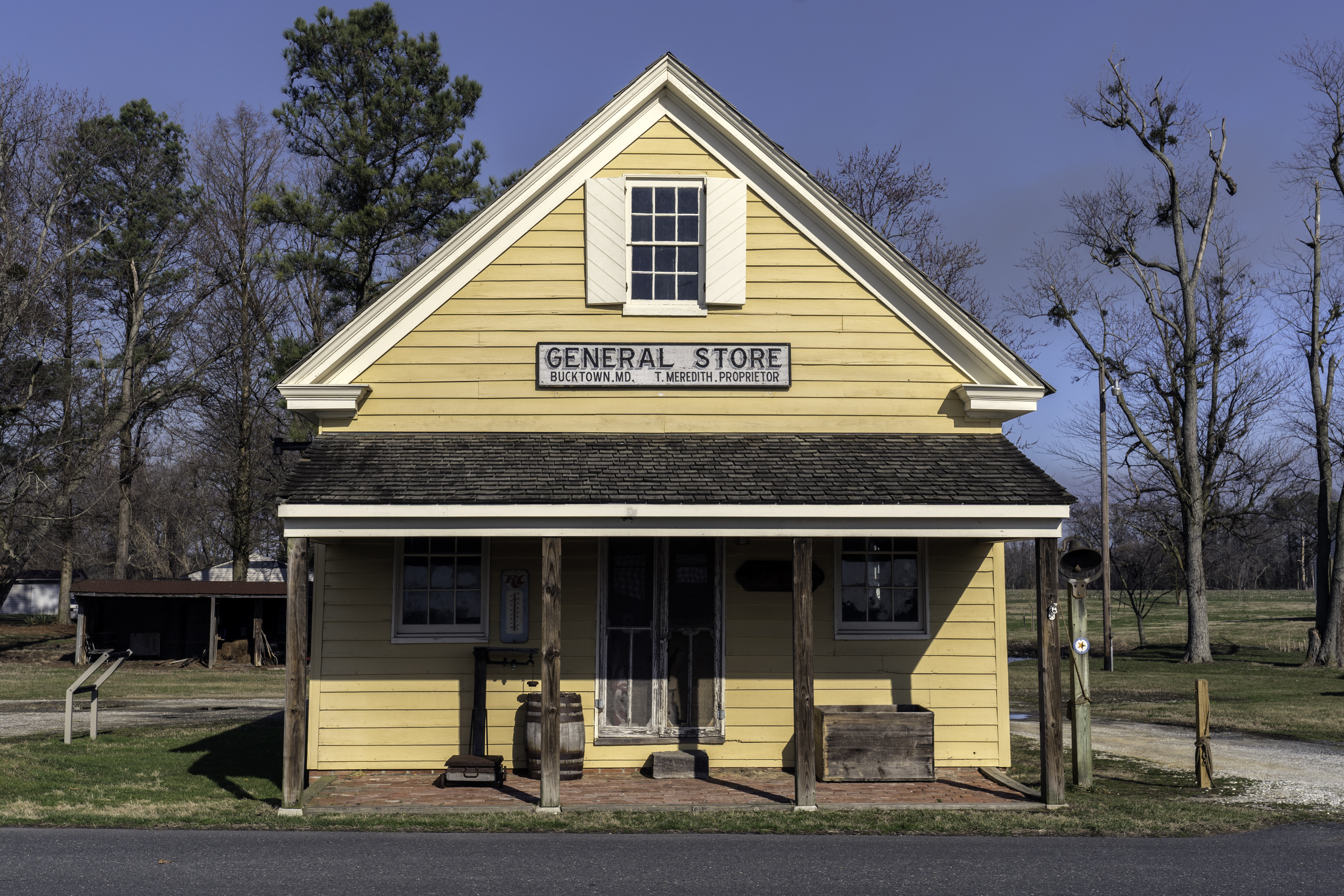
General store in Bucktown

Bucktown is an unincorporated community in Dorchester County, in the U.S. state of Maryland.

== History ==
A post office was established at Bucktown in 1856, and remained in operation until 1907. David M. Corkran was postmaster in 1859.

== Notable person ==
Harriet Tubman, African-American abolitionist and political activist, was a slave on the Brodess plantation near Bucktown.
