= 2008 United States House of Representatives elections in Maryland =

- November 4, 2008

All 8 Maryland seats to the United States House of Representatives
	Majority party	Minority party
Party	Democratic	Republican
Last election	6	2
Seats won	7	1
Seat change	▲1	▼1
Popular vote	1,677,490	762,587
Percentage	67.15%	30.53%
Swing	▲2.52%	▼1.62%

Democratic hold Democratic gain
Republican hold
Democratic
40–50%
50–60%
60–70%
70–80%
80–90%
90–100%
Republican
40–50%
50–60%
60–70%

The 2008 congressional elections in Maryland were held on November 4, 2008, to determine who would represent the state of Maryland in the United States House of Representatives, coinciding with the presidential election. Representatives are elected for two-year terms; those elected serve in the 111th Congress from January 3, 2009, until January 3, 2011.

Maryland has eight seats in the House, apportioned according to the 2000 United States census. Its 2007–2008 congressional delegation consisted of six Democrats and two Republicans. Following the election, the delegation became seven Democrats and one Republican. District 1 was the only seat which changed party (from Republican to Democratic), and was the only district CQ Politics had forecast to be at some risk for the incumbent party.

== Overview ==
United States House of Representatives elections in Maryland, 2008
Party	Votes	Percentage	+/−	Seats	+/−
Democratic	1,677,490	67.15%	+2.52%	7	+1
Republican	762,587	30.53%	−1.62%	1	−1
Libertarian	47,708	1.91%	+1.62%	0	—
Green	6,828	0.27%	−2.25%	0	—
Others	3,339	0.13%	−0.25%	0	—
Totals	2,497,952	100.00%	—	8	—

== District 1 ==
2008 Maryland's 1st congressional district election
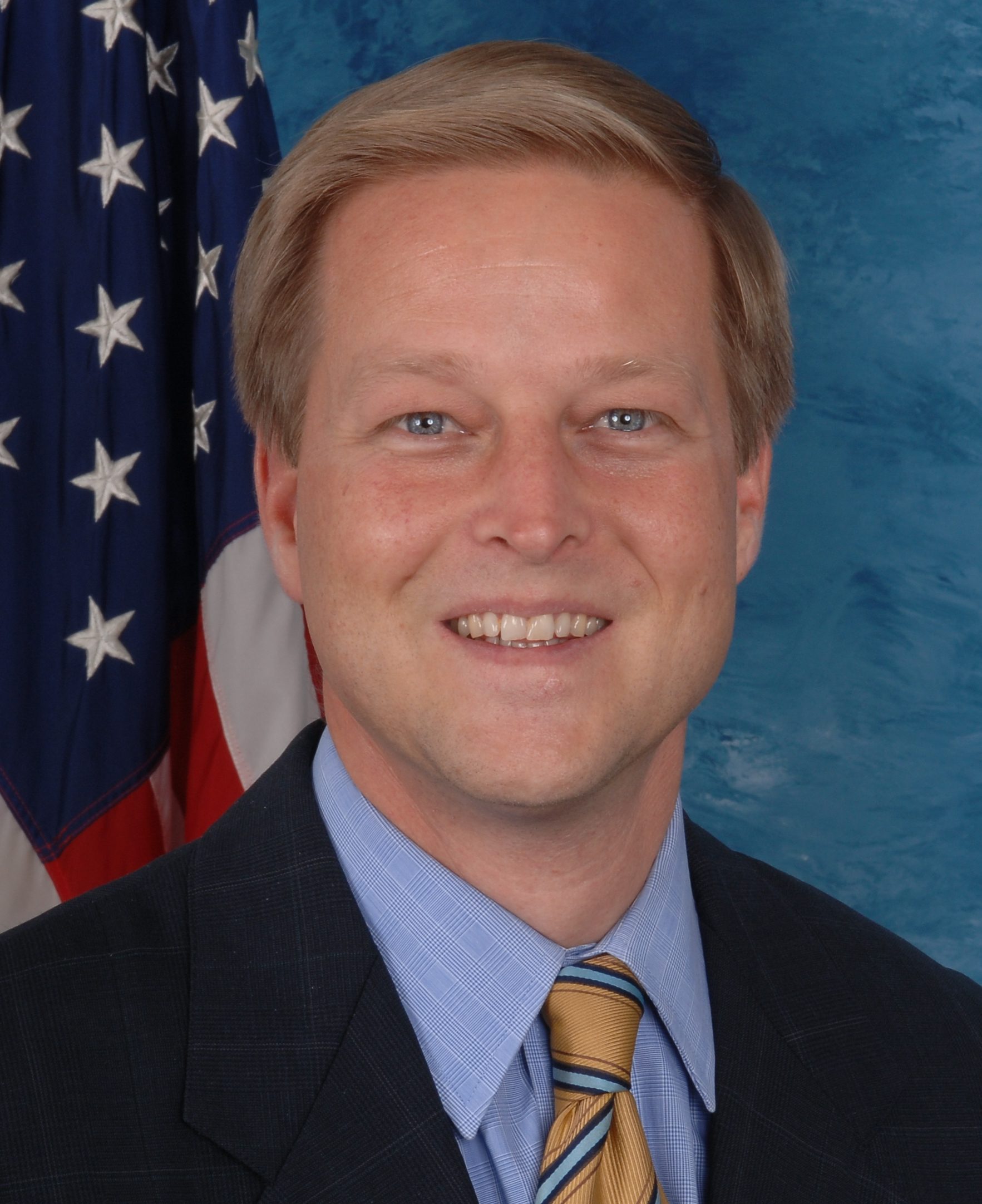

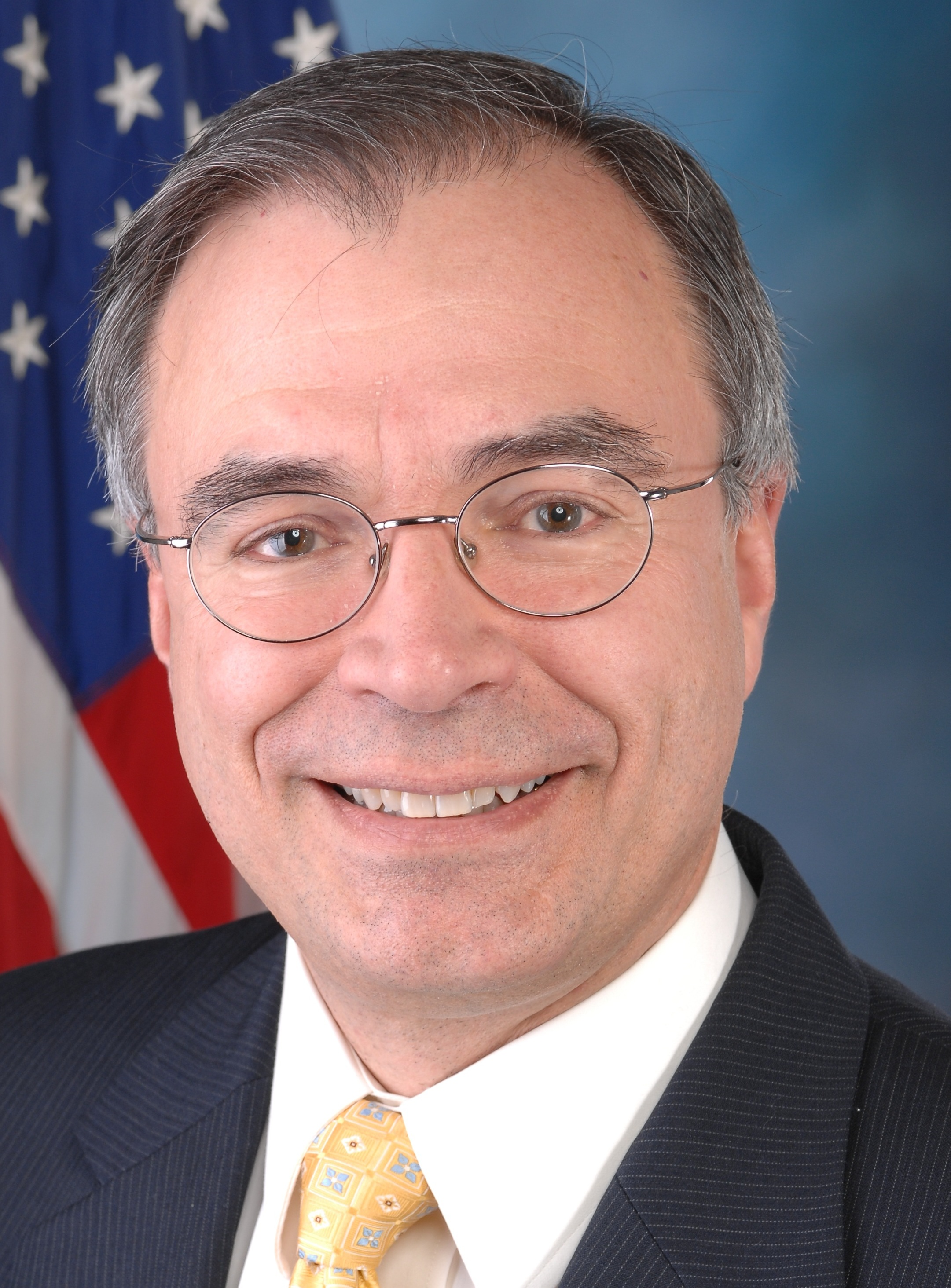
Nominee	Frank Kratovil	Andy Harris
Party	Democratic	Republican
Popular vote	177,065	174,213
Percentage	49.1%	48.3%
- County results Kratovil: 40–50% 50–60% 60–70% Harris: 50–60%
U.S. Representative before election
Wayne Gilchrest
Republican
Elected U.S. Representative
Frank Kratovil
Democratic

The district encompasses the entire Eastern Shore of Maryland, as well as parts of Anne Arundel, Baltimore and Harford Counties, and was represented by Republican Wayne Gilchrest since 1991.

Incumbent Wayne Gilchrest, a Republican, lost to state senator Andy Harris in the Republican primary, in which E.J. Pipkin also ran. Gilchrest was one of only two Republicans to vote for the bill to set a timetable on the Iraq War, which passed, 218–212; he also voted on April 25, 2007, for another Democratic Iraq War bill, which passed, 218–208. Harris was first elected to the Maryland Senate in 1998 and served as Minority Whip, 2003–2006. He has worked as an anesthesiologist, an associate professor of anesthesiology and critical care medicine, and chief of obstetric anesthesiology at Johns Hopkins Hospital. Harris entered the February 12 primary with endorsements from the Club for Growth, former Governor Bob Ehrlich, seven of ten state senators who represent parts of the Congressional district, and House minority leader Anthony J. O'Donnell. Despite Gilchrest's endorsement by The Baltimore Sun, Harris defeated him by 10 points in a relatively bitter race.

Queen Anne's County State's Attorney Frank M. Kratovil, Jr., went into the February 12 primary as the Democratic frontrunner, with primary endorsement from The Baltimore Sun, governor Martin O'Malley, and Maryland comptroller Peter Franchot. Kratovil became Assistant State's Attorney in 1997, State's Attorney in 2003, and president of Maryland State's Attorney's Association, 2005–2007. He defeated his closest opponent, Cambridge lawyer Christopher Robinson, by nine points in a primary that was considered much more civil than on the Republican side.

While Harris had stated his belief that "the 1st Congressional District was drawn by Democrats to elect Republicans" and Gilchrest had carried the district for nine terms, Democratic leaders believed the district had "a moderate character" and was ready to support Kratovil competitively. In addition to targeting by the Democratic Congressional Campaign Committee, Gilchrest staffers held "Republicans for Kratovil" events. Gilchrest hinted early on that he would endorse Kratovil, being quoted as saying, "Let's see, the Republican Party, or my eternal soul?" and "Party loyalty, or integrity?" On April 17, 2008, an article in Politico announced that long-time Wayne Gilchrest campaign manager Lynn Caliguri, spouse of Gilchrest chief of staff Tony Caliguri, had joined the Kratovil campaign. In early September 2008, Gilchrest officially endorsed Kratovil.

Kratovil defeated Harris by a margin of 0.79 percentage points. As of 2026, this is the first, and to date, the only time Andy Harris lost in the district, (Note: It was also the only time Harris was defeated in any election.) as he would go on to defeat Kratovil two years later and win every election since then.

=== Republican primary ===
==== Nominee ====
- Andy Harris, state senator

==== Eliminated in primary ====
- Wayne Gilchrest, incumbent U.S. representative
- E. J. Pipkin, state senator
- Joe Arminio, author
- Robert Banks, former state official

==== Results ====
2008 GOP primary results by county: Harris: 40–50%; 50–60%; 60–70%; Gilchrest: 30–40%; 40–50%; 50–60%; 60–70%; Thomas: 30–40%

Republican primary results
Party	Candidate	Votes	%
Republican	Andy Harris	33,627	43.44%
Republican	Wayne Gilchrest (incumbent)	25,624	33.10%
Republican	E. J. Pipkin	15,700	20.28%
Republican	Joe Arminio	1,277	1.65%
Republican	Robert Banks	1,186	1.53%
Total votes		77,414	100.0%

=== Predictions ===
Source	Ranking	As of
The Cook Political Report	Tossup	November 6, 2008
Rothenberg	Tossup	November 2, 2008
Sabato's Crystal Ball	Lean R	November 6, 2008
Real Clear Politics	Lean R	November 7, 2008
CQ Politics	Tossup	November 6, 2008

Maryland's 1st Congressional District: 2008
Party	Candidate	Votes	%	±%
Democratic	Frank Kratovil	177,065	49.12%	+18.01
Republican	Andy Harris	174,213	48.33%	−20.47
Libertarian	Richard J. Davis	8,873	2.46%	+2.46
No party	Write-ins	329	0.09	
Total votes		360,480	100.00	
Democratic gain from Republican				

== District 2 ==
2008 Maryland's 2nd congressional district election
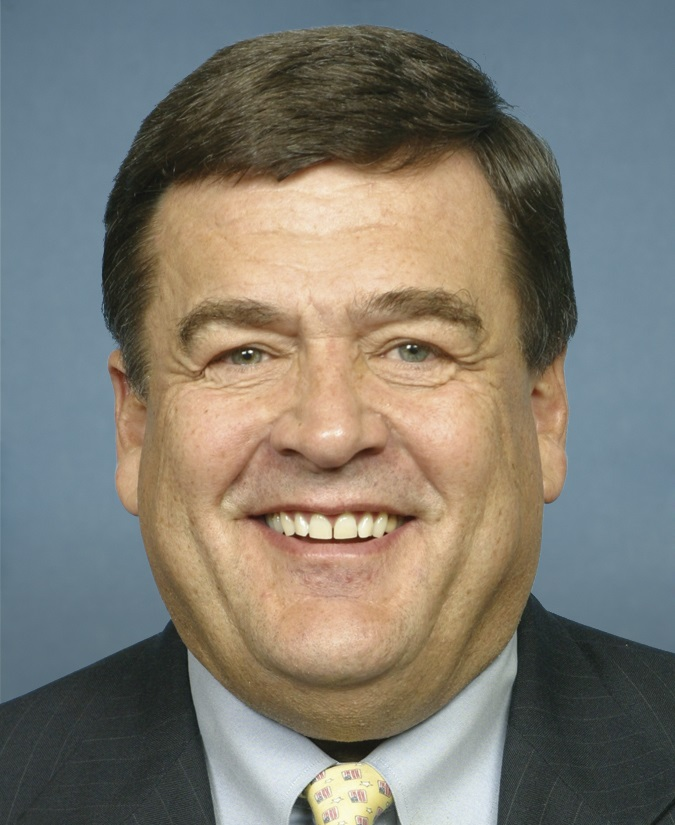

Nominee	Dutch Ruppersberger	Richard Matthews
Party	Democratic	Republican
Popular vote	198,578	68,561
Percentage	71.9%	24.8%
- County results Ruppersberger: 60–70% 70–80% 90–100%
U.S. Representative before election
Dutch Ruppersberger
Democratic
Elected U.S. Representative
Dutch Ruppersberger
Democratic

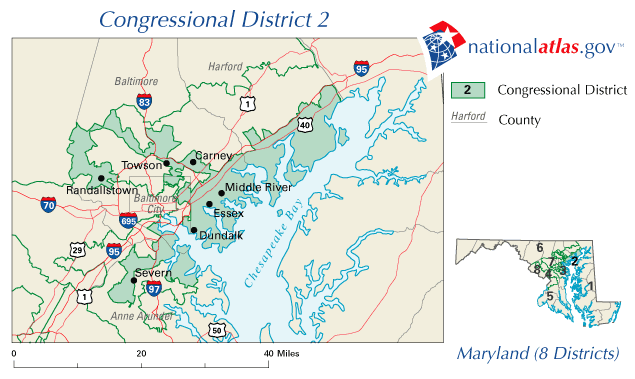

The district comprises parts of Harford, Baltimore, and Anne Arundel Counties, as well as small portions of the City of Baltimore, and has been represented by Democrat Dutch Ruppersberger since 2003. Prior to serving in Congress, Ruppersberger was Baltimore County Executive from 1994 to 2002. Ruppersberger serves on the House Permanent Select Committee on Intelligence, the House Committee on Appropriations, and the Democratic Steering Committee.

The Republican candidate is Richard Matthews, a 28-year-old computer systems engineer from Orchard Beach, who is also the Anne Arundel County, Maryland organizer for the Ron Paul 2008 Presidential campaign. Matthews is a moderate Republican with libertarian political views on civil liberties and economic freedom. He opposes the Iraq War, and generally supports freedom of choice in both personal and economic matters.

=== Predictions ===
Source	Ranking	As of
The Cook Political Report	Safe D	November 6, 2008
Rothenberg	Safe D	November 2, 2008
Sabato's Crystal Ball	Safe D	November 6, 2008
Real Clear Politics	Safe D	November 7, 2008
CQ Politics	Safe D	November 6, 2008

Maryland's 2nd Congressional District: 2008
Party	Candidate	Votes	%	±%
Democratic	Dutch Ruppersberger (incumbent)	198,578	71.86%	+2.65
Republican	Richard Matthews	68,561	24.81%	−5.87
Libertarian	Lorenzo Gaztanaga	8,786	3.18%	+3.18
No party	Write-ins	408	0.15	
Total votes		276,333	100.00	
Democratic hold		Swing		

== District 3 ==
2008 Maryland's 3rd congressional district election
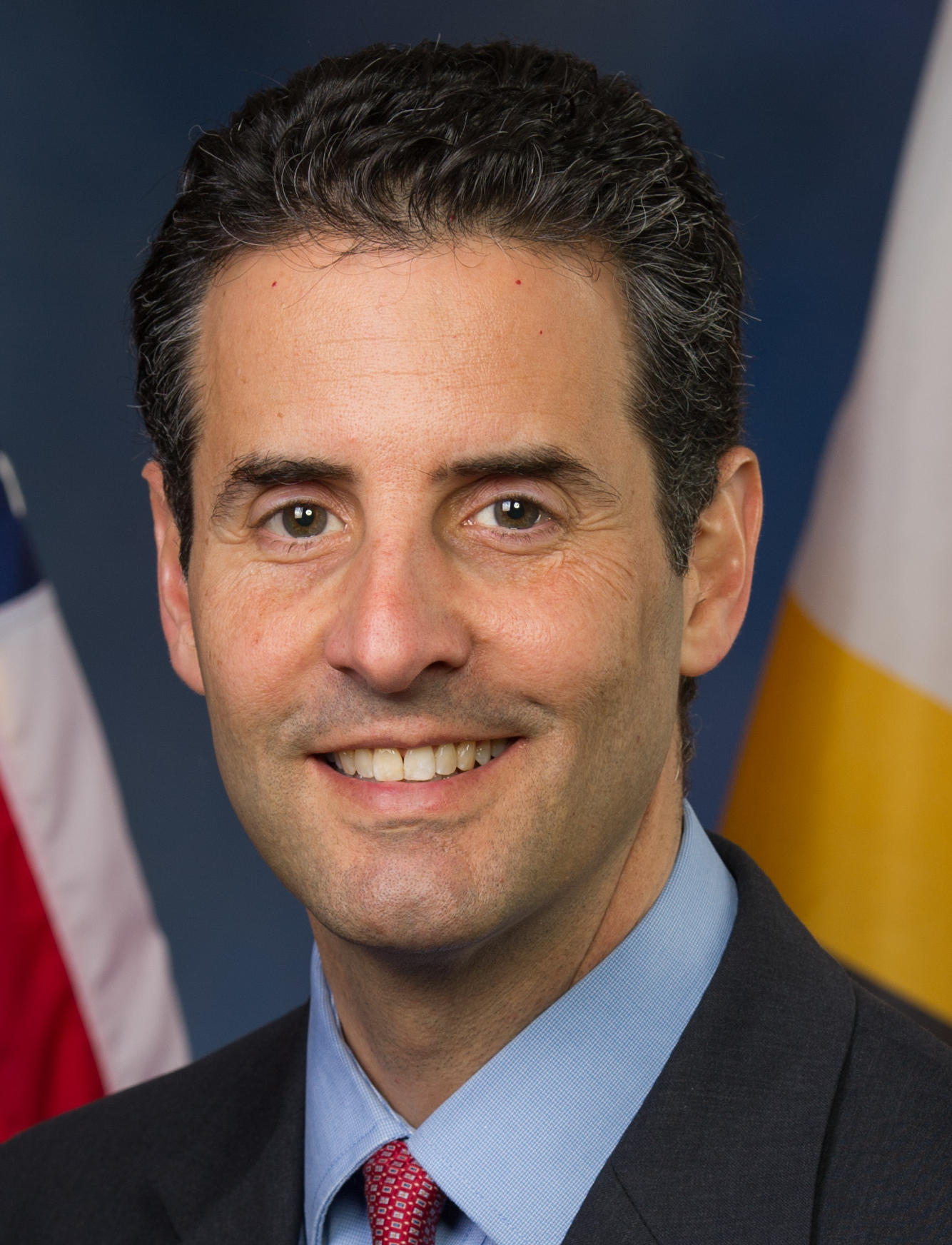

Nominee	John Sarbanes	Thomas E. Harris
Party	Democratic	Republican
Popular vote	203,711	87,971
Percentage	69.7%	30.1%
- County results Sarbanes: 60–70% 70–80% 80–90%
U.S. Representative before election
John Sarbanes
Democratic
Elected U.S. Representative
John Sarbanes
Democratic

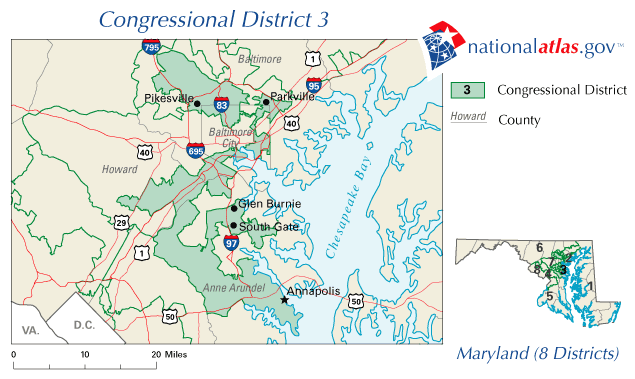

The district comprises portions of Baltimore, Howard and Anne Arundel counties, as well as a significant part of the independent city of Baltimore, and has been represented by Democrat John Sarbanes since 2007. Sarbanes faced off against Republican candidate Thomas Harris; in this staunchly liberal district, Harris faced little chance against the popular Sarbanes.

=== Predictions ===
Source	Ranking	As of
The Cook Political Report	Safe D	November 6, 2008
Rothenberg	Safe D	November 2, 2008
Sabato's Crystal Ball	Safe D	November 6, 2008
Real Clear Politics	Safe D	November 7, 2008
CQ Politics	Safe D	November 6, 2008

Maryland's 3rd Congressional District: 2008
Party	Candidate	Votes	%	±%
Democratic	John Sarbanes (incumbent)	203,711	69.66%	+5.63
Republican	Thomas E. Harris	87,971	30.08%	−3.68
No party	Write-ins	766	0.26	
Total votes		292,448	100.00	
Democratic hold		Swing		

== District 4 ==
2008 Maryland's 4th congressional district election
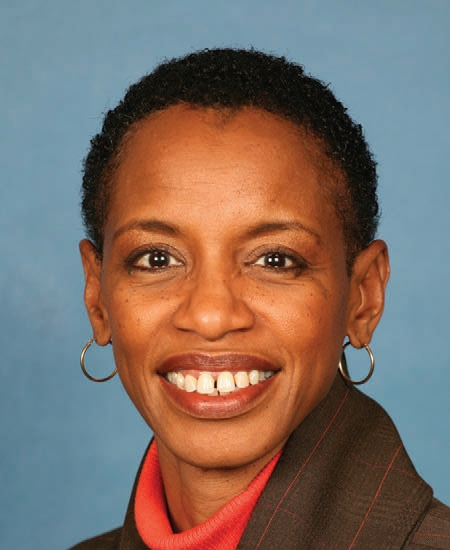

Nominee	Donna Edwards	Peter James
Party	Democratic	Republican
Popular vote	258,704	38,739
Percentage	85.8%	12.8%
- County results Edwards: 70–80% 90–100%
U.S. Representative before election
Al Wynn
Democratic
Elected U.S. Representative
Donna Edwards
Democratic

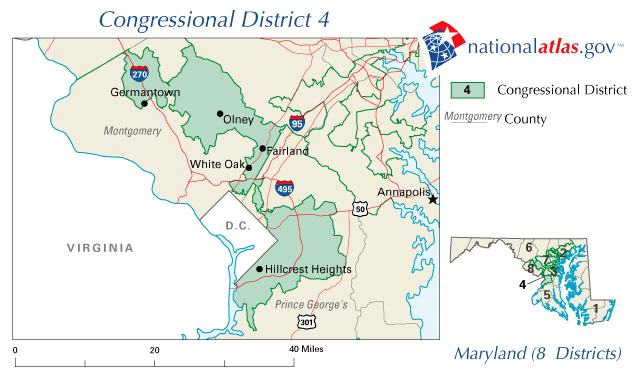

The district comprises portions of Prince George's and Montgomery Counties, and has been represented by Democrat Al Wynn since 1993. Coming off a close primary against progressive advocate Donna Edwards in 2006, Wynn faced a competitive primary against her again in 2008. While Wynn made an effort to appear more progressive, he remains one of the most conservative members of the Congressional Black Caucus. This time, Edwards defeated Wynn in the primary. Wynn then announced he would be leaving Congress before his term's expiration in January 2009, which triggered a special election.

=== Predictions ===
Source	Ranking	As of
The Cook Political Report	Safe D	November 6, 2008
Rothenberg	Safe D	November 2, 2008
Sabato's Crystal Ball	Safe D	November 6, 2008
Real Clear Politics	Safe D	November 7, 2008
CQ Politics	Safe D	November 6, 2008

Maryland's 4th Congressional District: 2008
Party	Candidate	Votes	%	±%
Democratic	Donna Edwards	258,704	85.83%	+5.16
Republican	Peter James	38,739	12.85%	−5.79
Libertarian	Thibeaux Lincecum	3,384	1.12%	+1.12
No party	Write-ins	604	0.20	
Total votes		301,431	100.00	
Democratic hold		Swing		

== District 5 ==
2008 Maryland's 5th congressional district election
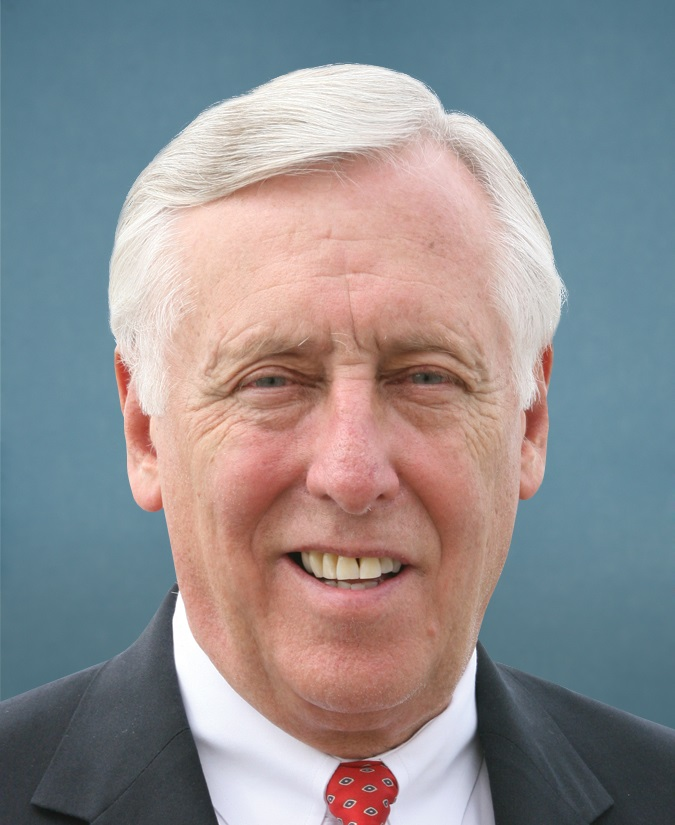

Nominee	Steny Hoyer	Collins Bailey
Party	Democratic	Republican
Popular vote	253,854	82,631
Percentage	73.7%	24.0%
- County results Hoyer: 50–60% 60–70% 70–80% 80–90%
U.S. Representative before election
Steny Hoyer
Democratic
Elected U.S. Representative
Steny Hoyer
Democratic

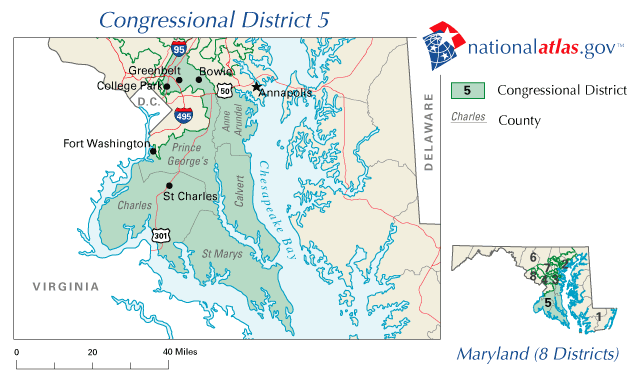

The district comprises all of Charles, St. Mary's, and Calvert Counties, as well as portions of Prince George's and Anne Arundel Counties. The seat has been represented by Democrat and House Majority Leader Steny Hoyer since 1981. He was challenged by Collins Bailey, a businessman and fourth-term elected member of the Charles County Board of Education.

=== Predictions ===
Source	Ranking	As of
The Cook Political Report	Safe D	November 6, 2008
Rothenberg	Safe D	November 2, 2008
Sabato's Crystal Ball	Safe D	November 6, 2008
Real Clear Politics	Safe D	November 7, 2008
CQ Politics	Safe D	November 6, 2008

Maryland's 5th Congressional District: 2008
Party	Candidate	Votes	%	±%
Democratic	Steny Hoyer (incumbent)	253,854	73.65%	−9.03
Republican	Collins Bailey	82,631	23.97%	+23.97
Libertarian	Darlene H. Nicolas	7,829	2.27%	+2.27
No party	Write-ins	377	0.11	
Total votes		344,691	100.00	
Democratic hold		Swing		

== District 6 ==
2008 Maryland's 6th congressional district election
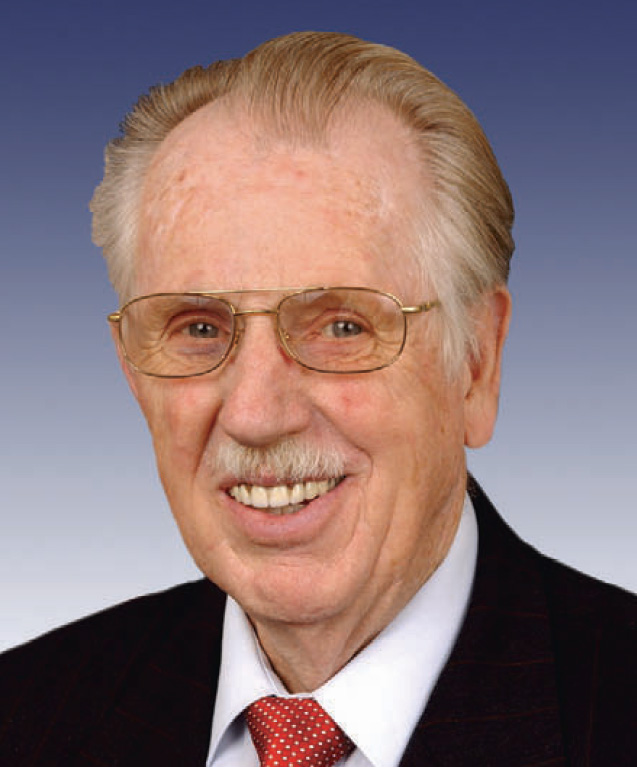

Nominee	Roscoe Bartlett	Jennifer Dougherty
Party	Republican	Democratic
Popular vote	190,926	128,207
Percentage	57.8%	38.8%
- County results Bartlett: 50–60% 60–70%
U.S. Representative before election
Roscoe Bartlett
Republican
Elected U.S. Representative
Roscoe Bartlett
Republican

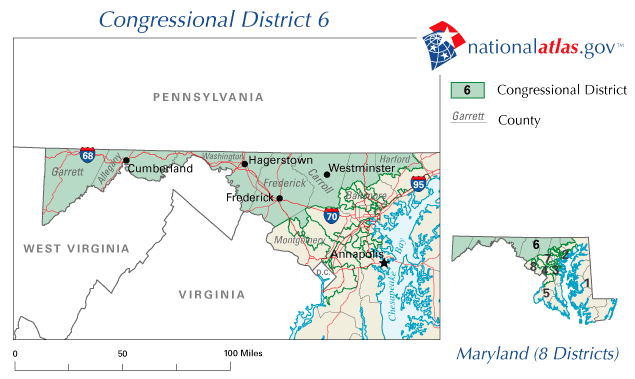

The district comprises all of Garrett, Allegany, Washington, Frederick and Carroll Counties, as well as portions of Montgomery, Baltimore, and Harford Counties, and has been represented by Republican Roscoe Bartlett since 1993.

Bartlett's district is one of the more Republican seats in heavily Democratic Maryland, and includes several western cities such as Frederick and Hagerstown. Bartlett was 82 as of June 3, 2008. While he still managed to receive 58% of the vote in 2006 against little-known Democratic opponent Andrew J. Duck, a stockbroker and U.S. Army veteran, it was nine points lower than his 2004 showing. Although there were early rumors that Bartlett would retire rather than run again, he subsequently filed his candidacy for re-election. Duck, too, ran again in 2008. In a surprise, former Cumberland Mayor Frank K. Nethken announced that he would be a candidate for the GOP nomination even if Bartlett sought re-election. While Andrew Duck ran for the Democratic nomination, he lost to Jennifer Dougherty, the former Mayor of Frederick. Roscoe Bartlett won the Republican nomination.

=== Predictions ===
Source	Ranking	As of
The Cook Political Report	Safe R	November 6, 2008
Rothenberg	Safe R	November 2, 2008
Sabato's Crystal Ball	Safe R	November 6, 2008
Real Clear Politics	Safe R	November 7, 2008
CQ Politics	Safe R	November 6, 2008

Maryland's 6th Congressional District: 2008
Party	Candidate	Votes	%	±%
Republican	Roscoe Bartlett (incumbent)	190,926	57.76%	−1.21
Democratic	Jennifer Dougherty	128,207	38.79%	+0.36
Libertarian	Gary W. Hoover, Sr.	11,060	3.35%	+3.35
No party	Write-ins	342	0.10	
Total votes		330,535	100.00	
Republican hold		Swing		

== District 7 ==
2008 Maryland's 7th congressional district election
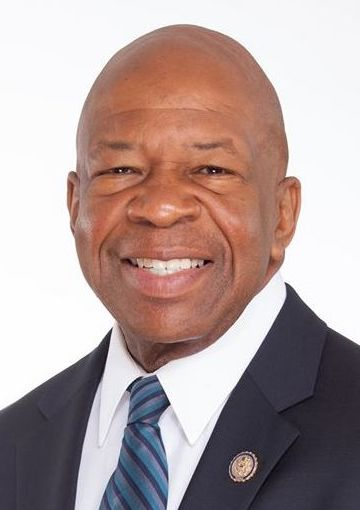

Nominee	Elijah Cummings	Michael T. Hargadon
Party	Democratic	Republican
Popular vote	227,379	53,147
Percentage	79.5%	18.6%
- County results Cummings: 50–60% 70–80% 90–100%
U.S. Representative before election
Elijah Cummings
Democratic
Elected U.S. Representative
Elijah Cummings
Democratic

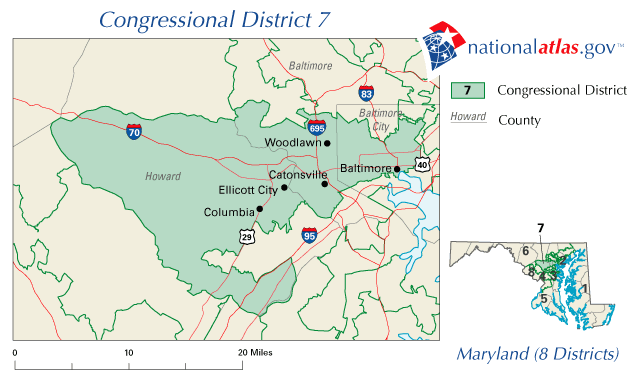

The district encompasses parts of Baltimore City, Baltimore County, and Howard County, and has been represented by Democrat Elijah Cummings since 1996. Cummings did not face any opposition in the Democratic primary or general election in his last election, but faced Republican Michael Hargadon and Libertarian Ronald Owens-Bey, whom he easily defeated.

=== Predictions ===
Source	Ranking	As of
The Cook Political Report	Safe D	November 6, 2008
Rothenberg	Safe D	November 2, 2008
Sabato's Crystal Ball	Safe D	November 6, 2008
Real Clear Politics	Safe D	November 7, 2008
CQ Politics	Safe D	November 6, 2008

Maryland's 7th Congressional District: 2008
Party	Candidate	Votes	%	±%
Democratic	Elijah Cummings (incumbent)	227,379	79.50%	−18.56
Republican	Michael T. Hargadon	53,147	18.58%	+18.58
Libertarian	Ronald M. Owens-Bey	5,214	1.82%	+1.82
No party	Write-ins	280	0.10	
Total votes		286,020	100.00	
Democratic hold		Swing		

== District 8 ==
2008 Maryland's 8th congressional district election
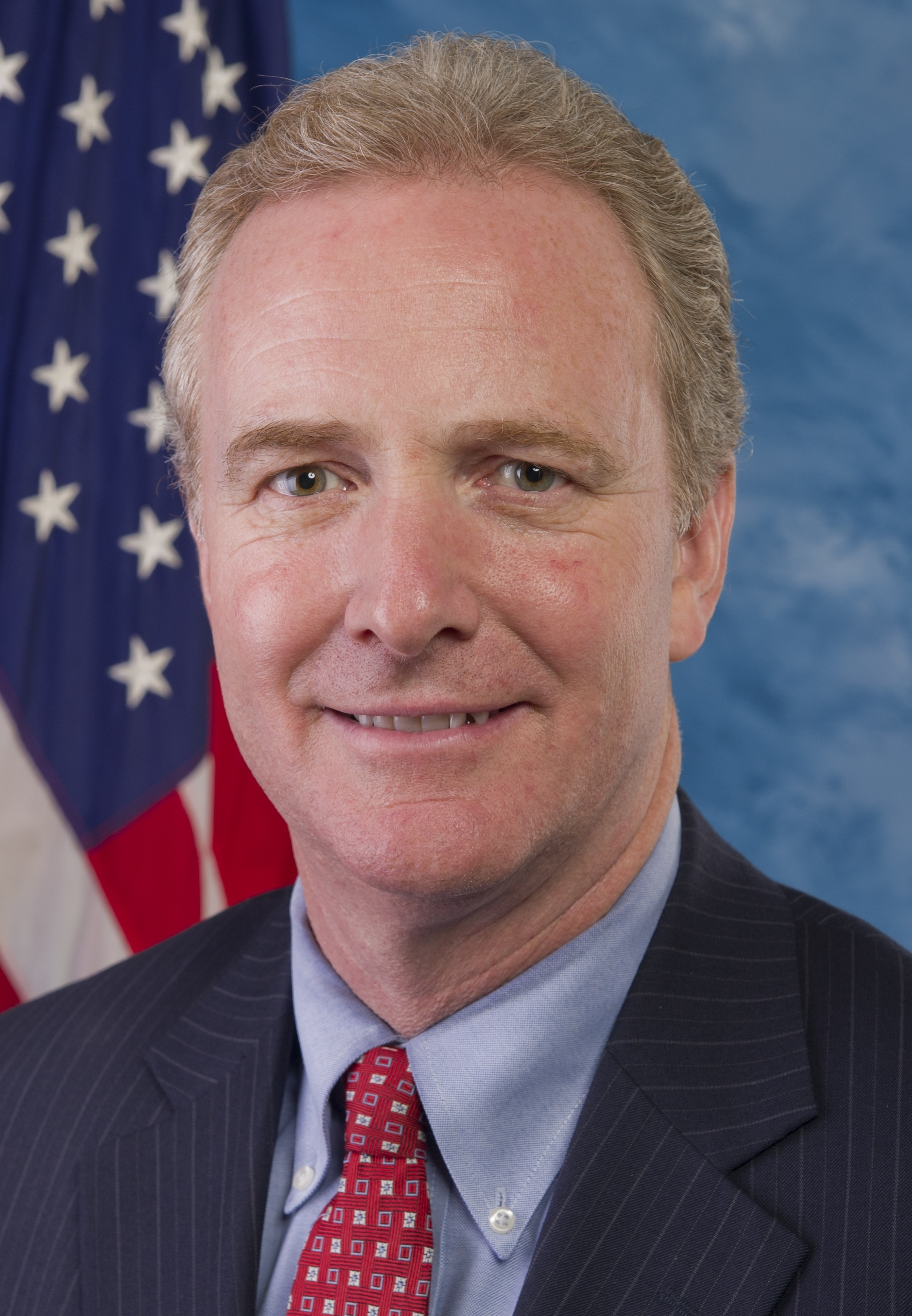

Nominee	Chris Van Hollen	Steve Hudson
Party	Democratic	Republican
Popular vote	229,740	66,351
Percentage	75.1%	21.7%
- County results Hollen: 70–80% 90–100%
U.S. Representative before election
Chris Van Hollen
Democratic
Elected U.S. Representative
Chris Van Hollen
Democratic

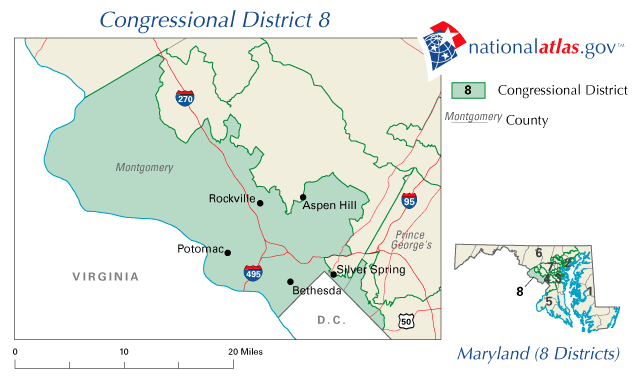

The district mostly consists of the larger part of Montgomery County, but also includes a small portion of Prince George's County, and has been represented by Democrat Chris Van Hollen since 2003. Van Hollen has achieved national prominence as head of the Democratic Congressional Campaign Committee.

=== Predictions ===
Source	Ranking	As of
The Cook Political Report	Safe D	November 6, 2008
Rothenberg	Safe D	November 2, 2008
Sabato's Crystal Ball	Safe D	November 6, 2008
Real Clear Politics	Safe D	November 7, 2008
CQ Politics	Safe D	November 6, 2008

Maryland's 8th Congressional District: 2008
Party	Candidate	Votes	%	±%
Democratic	Chris Van Hollen (incumbent)	229,740	75.08%	−1.44
Republican	Steve Hudson	66,351	21.68%	−0.22
Green	Gordon Clark	6,828	2.23%	+0.74
Libertarian	Ian Thomas	2,562	0.84%	+0.84
Write-in	All write-ins	533	0.17%	
Total votes		306,014	100.00	
Democratic hold		Swing		
