= 2010 United States House of Representatives elections in Maryland =

- November 2, 2010

All 8 Maryland seats to the United States House of Representatives
	Majority party	Minority party
Party	Democratic	Republican
Last election	7	1
Seats won	6	2
Seat change	▼1	▲1
Popular vote	1,104,056	674,246
Percentage	60.48%	36.94%
Swing	▼6.67%	▲6.41%

Democratic hold
Republican hold Republican gain
Democratic
40–50%
50–60%
60–70%
70–80%
80–90%
Republican
50–60%
60–70%
70–80%

The 2010 congressional elections in Maryland were held on November 2, 2010, to determine who will represent the state of Maryland in the United States House of Representatives. Maryland has eight seats in the House, apportioned according to the 2000 United States census. Representatives are elected for two-year terms; those elected served in the 112th Congress from January 3, 2011, until January 3, 2013. The party primaries were held September 14, 2010.

As of 2024, this is the last time that Republicans won more than one congressional district in Maryland.

== Overview ==
United States House of Representatives elections in Maryland, 2010
Party	Seats	Gains	Losses	Net gain/loss	Seats %	Votes %	Votes	+/−
Democratic	6	0	1	–1	75%	60.48%	1,104,056	-6.67%
Republican	2	1	0	+1	25%	36.94%	674,246	+6.41%
Libertarian	0	0	0	0	—	2.03%	37,099	+0.12%
Constitution	0	0	0	0	—	0.45%	8,237	+0.45%
Other parties	0	0	0	0	—	0.10%	1,834	-0.03%
Totals	8	1	1	—	100%	100%	1,825,472	

=== By district ===
Results of the 2010 United States House of Representatives elections in Maryland by district:

District	Democratic		Republican		Others		Total		Result
District	Votes	%	Votes	%	Votes	%	Votes	%	Result
District 1	120,400	41.98%	155,118	54.08%	11,294	3.94%	286,812	100.0%	Republican gain
District 2	134,133	64.21%	69,523	33.28%	5,248	2.51%	208,904	100.0%	Democratic hold
District 3	147,448	61.07%	86,947	36.01%	7,034	2.91%	241,429	100.0%	Democratic hold
District 4	160,228	83.44%	31,467	16.39%	325	0.17%	192,020	100.0%	Democratic hold
District 5	155,110	64.26%	83,575	34.62%	2,698	1.12%	241,383	100.0%	Democratic hold
District 6	80,455	33.22%	148,820	61.45%	12,914	5.33%	242,189	100.0%	Republican hold
District 7	152,669	75.18%	46,375	22.84%	4,024	1.98%	203,068	100.0%	Democratic hold
District 8	153,613	73.27%	52,421	25.00%	3,633	1.73%	209,667	100.0%	Democratic hold
Total	1,104,056	60.48%	674,246	36.94%	47,170	2.58%	1,825,472	100.0%	

== District 1 ==
2010 Maryland's 1st congressional district election
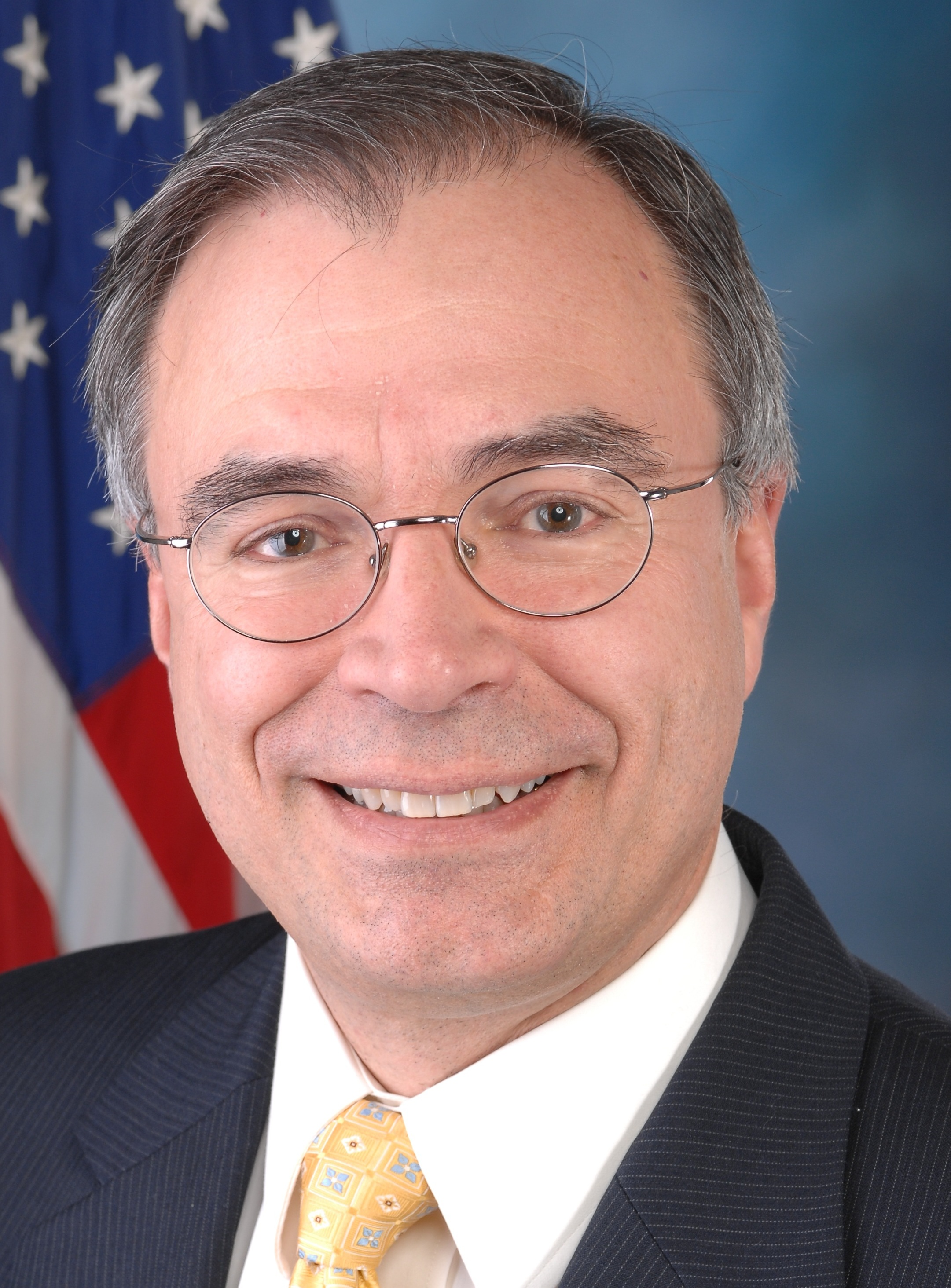

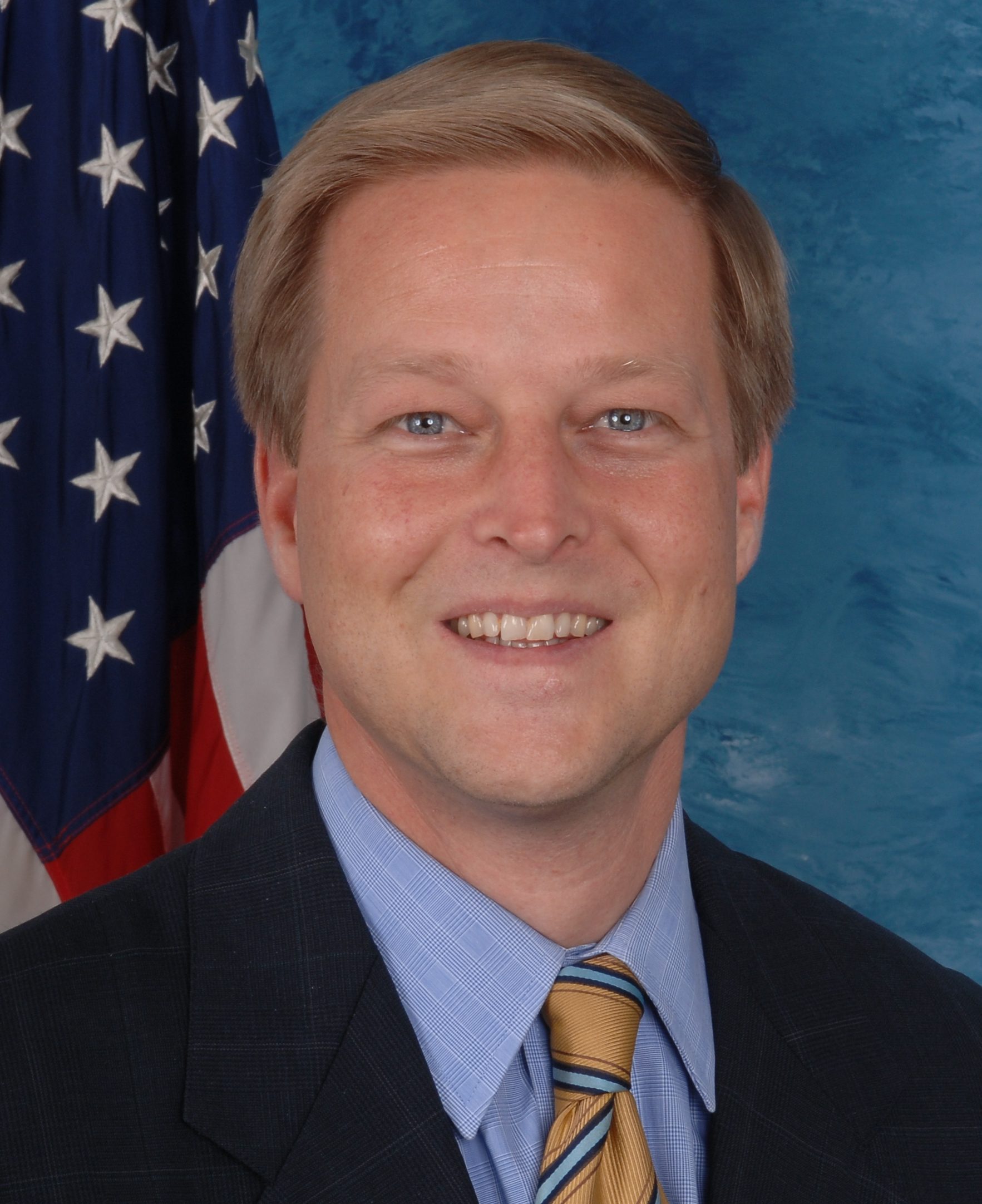
Nominee	Andy Harris	Frank Kratovil
Party	Republican	Democratic
Popular vote	155,118	120,400
Percentage	54.1%	42.0%
- County results Harris: 50–60% 60–70% Kratovil: 40–50% 50–60%
U.S. Representative before election
Frank Kratovil
Democratic
Elected U.S. Representative
Andy Harris
Republican

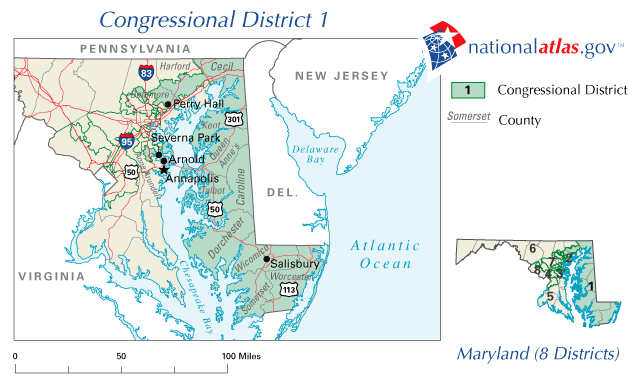

The district encompasses the entire Eastern Shore of Maryland, as well as parts of Anne Arundel, Baltimore and Harford Counties.

Incumbent Democrat Frank Kratovil ran for re-election against Republican State Senator Andy Harris. Libertarian Richard Davis and Independent Jack Wilson also ran.

- MD - District 1 from OurCampaigns.com
- Race ranking and details from CQ Politics
- Campaign contributions from OpenSecrets
- Race profile at The New York Times

=== Polling ===
Poll source	Dates administered	Frank Kratovil (D)	Andy Harris (R)	Richard Davis (L)	Other	Undecided
Baltimore Sun/OpinionWorks	October 15–20, 2010	40%	40%	—	—	14%
Monmouth University	October 16–19, 2010	42%	53%	—	—	5%
The Hill/ANGA	October 5, 2010	40%	43%	—	1%	15%
OnMessage Inc.	September 20–21, 2010	39%	43%	—	—	—
Garin-Hart-Yang Research Group†	September 12–13, 2010	45%	39%	—	—	—
Garin-Hart-Yang Research Group†	June 15–16, 2010	44%	39%	—	—	17%
Public Opinion Strategies	April 25–26, 2010	36%	39%	6%	1%	18%
Tarrance Group	November 15–17, 2009	39%	52%	—	—	—

† Internal poll for Kratovil campaign

==== Predictions ====
Source	Ranking	As of
The Cook Political Report	Lean R (flip)	November 1, 2010
Rothenberg	Lean R (flip)	November 1, 2010
Sabato's Crystal Ball	Lean R (flip)	November 1, 2010
RCP	Lean R (flip)	November 1, 2010
CQ Politics	Lean R (flip)	October 28, 2010
New York Times	Lean R (flip)	November 1, 2010
FiveThirtyEight	Likely R (flip)	November 1, 2010

Maryland's 1st Congressional District: 2010
Party	Candidate	Votes	%	±%
Republican	Andy Harris	155,118	54.08%	+5.75
Democratic	Frank Kratovil (incumbent)	120,400	41.98%	−7.14
Libertarian	Richard Davis	10,876	3.79%	+1.33
No party	Write-ins	418	0.15%	
Total votes		286,812	100.00	
Republican gain from Democratic				

== District 2 ==
2010 Maryland's 2nd congressional district election
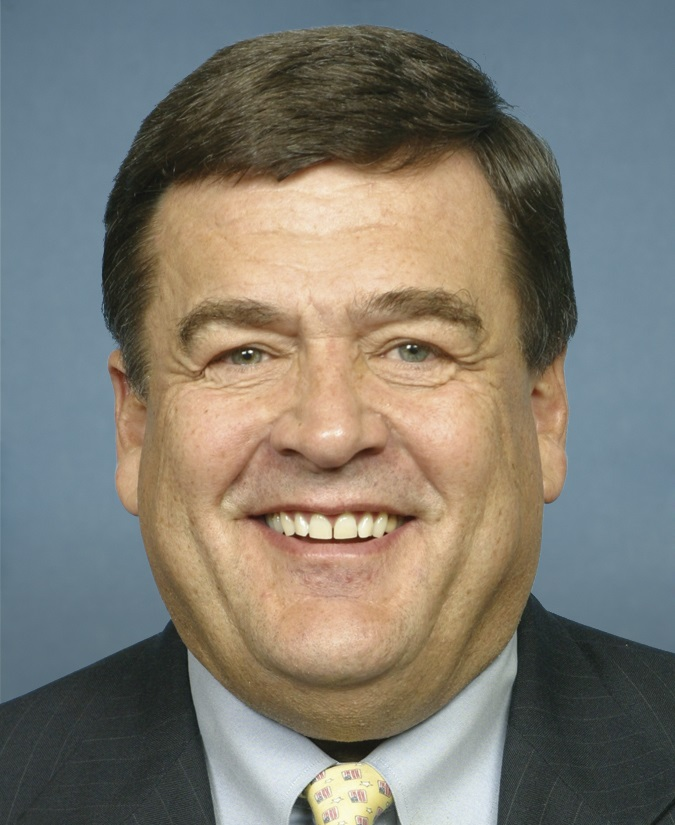

Nominee	Dutch Ruppersberger	Marcelo Cardarelli
Party	Democratic	Republican
Popular vote	134,133	69,523
Percentage	64.2%	33.3%
- County results Ruppersberger: 50–60% 60–70% 80–90%
U.S. Representative before election
Dutch Ruppersberger
Democratic
Elected U.S. Representative
Dutch Ruppersberger
Democratic

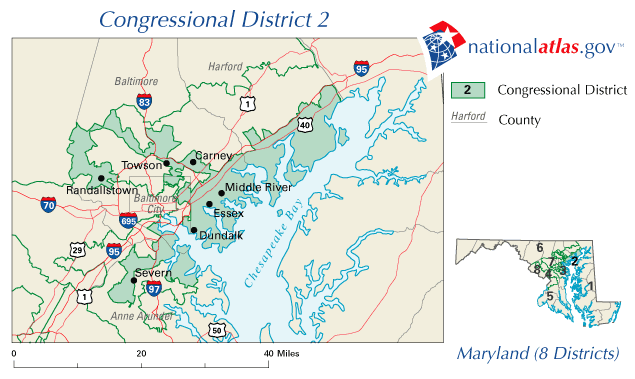

The district comprises parts of Harford, Baltimore, and Anne Arundel Counties, as well as small portions of the City of Baltimore, and has been represented by Democrat Dutch Ruppersberger since 2003; he ran for re-election against Republican Marcelo Cardarelli, a physician.

- Race ranking and details from CQ Politics
- Campaign contributions from OpenSecrets
- Race profile at The New York Times

=== Predictions ===
Source	Ranking	As of
The Cook Political Report	Safe D	November 1, 2010
Rothenberg	Safe D	November 1, 2010
Sabato's Crystal Ball	Safe D	November 1, 2010
RCP	Safe D	November 1, 2010
CQ Politics	Safe D	October 28, 2010
New York Times	Safe D	November 1, 2010
FiveThirtyEight	Safe D	November 1, 2010

Maryland's 2nd Congressional District: 2010
Party	Candidate	Votes	%	±%
Democratic	Dutch Ruppersberger (incumbent)	134,133	64.21%	−7.65
Republican	Marcelo Cardarelli	69,523	33.28%	+8.47
Libertarian	Lorenzo Gaztanaga	5,090	2.44%	−0.74
No party	Write-ins	158	0.08%	
Total votes		208,904	100.00	
Democratic hold				

== District 3 ==
2010 Maryland's 3rd congressional district election
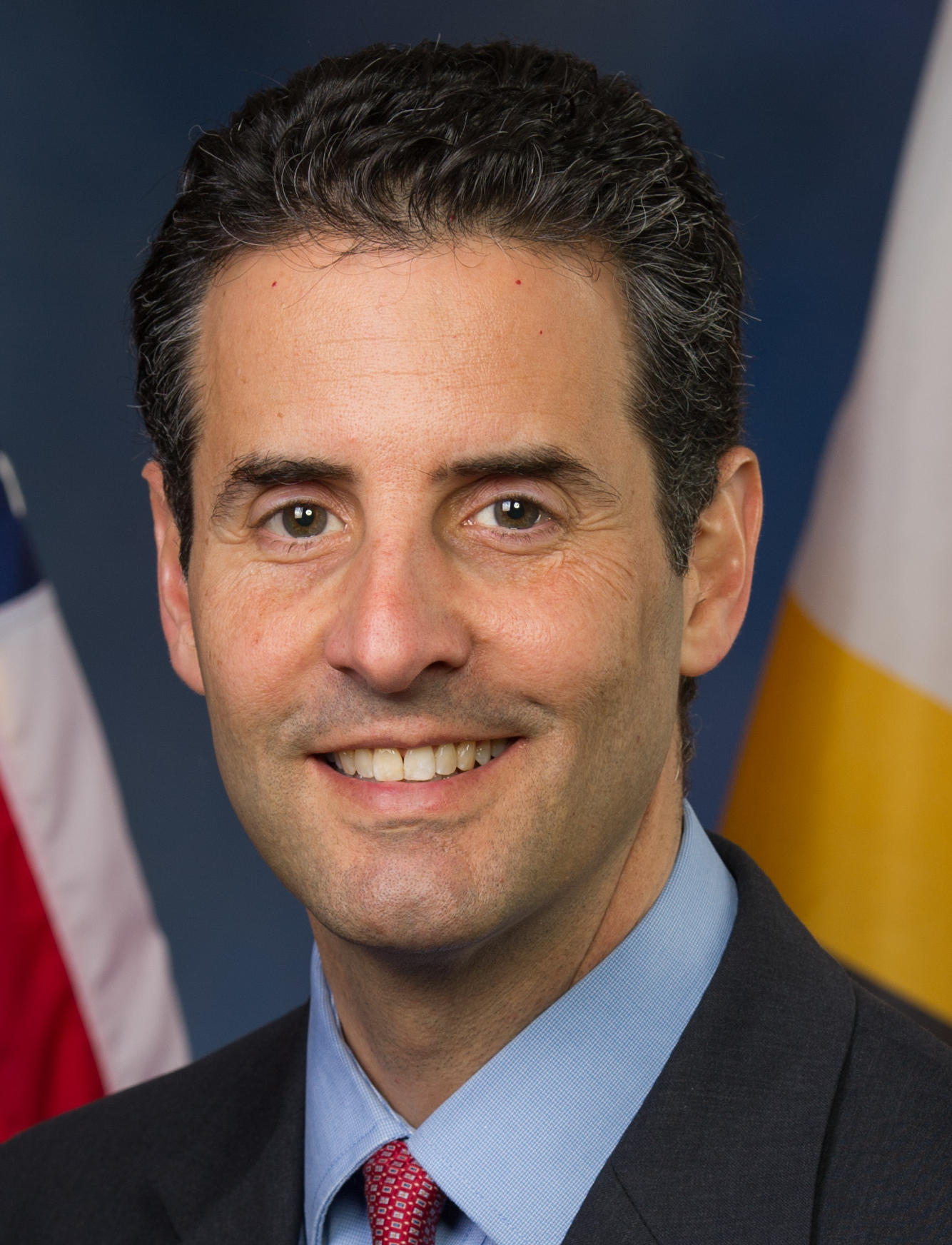

Nominee	John Sarbanes	Jim Wilhelm
Party	Democratic	Republican
Popular vote	147,448	86,947
Percentage	61.1%	36.0%
- County results Sarbanes: 50–60% 60–70% 70–80%
U.S. Representative before election
John Sarbanes
Democratic
Elected U.S. Representative
John Sarbanes
Democratic

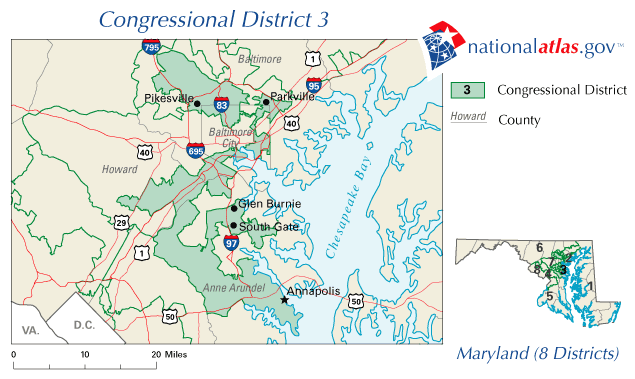

This gerrymandered district comprises portions of Baltimore, Howard and Anne Arundel counties, as well as a significant part of the independent city of Baltimore, and was represented by Democrat John Sarbanes since 2007. Sarbanes is the son of former Maryland Senator Paul Sarbanes. His Republican opponent was Jim Wilhelm.

- Race ranking and details from CQ Politics
- Campaign contributions from OpenSecrets
- profile at The New York Times

=== Predictions ===
Source	Ranking	As of
The Cook Political Report	Safe D	November 1, 2010
Rothenberg	Safe D	November 1, 2010
Sabato's Crystal Ball	Safe D	November 1, 2010
RCP	Safe D	November 1, 2010
CQ Politics	Safe D	October 28, 2010
New York Times	Safe D	November 1, 2010
FiveThirtyEight	Safe D	November 1, 2010

Maryland's 3rd Congressional District: 2010
Party	Candidate	Votes	%	±%
Democratic	John Sarbanes (incumbent)	147,448	61.07%	−8.59
Republican	Jim Wilhelm	86,947	36.01%	+5.93
Libertarian	Jerry McKinley	5,212	2.16%	+2.16
Constitution	Alain Lareau	1,634	0.68%	+0.68
No party	Write-ins	188	0.08%	
Total votes		241,429	100.00	
Democratic hold				

== District 4 ==
2010 Maryland's 4th congressional district election
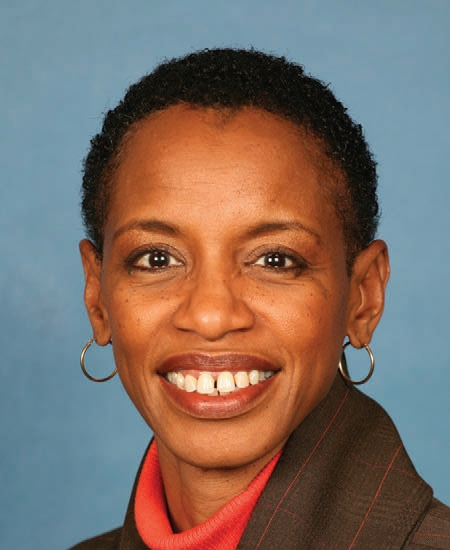

Nominee	Donna Edwards	Robert Broadus
Party	Democratic	Republican
Popular vote	160,228	31,467
Percentage	83.4%	16.4%
- County results Edwards: 60–70% 90–100%
U.S. Representative before election
Donna Edwards
Democratic
Elected U.S. Representative
Donna Edwards
Democratic

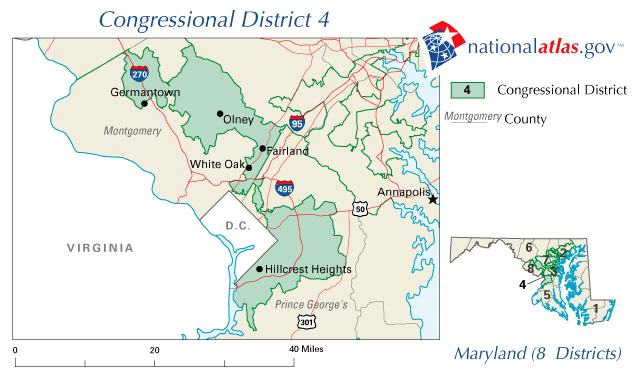

The district comprises portions of Prince George's and Montgomery Counties, and was represented by Democrat Donna Edwards. She ran for re-election against Republican Robert Broadus.

- Race ranking and details from CQ Politics
- Campaign contributions from OpenSecrets
- Race profile at The New York Times

=== Predictions ===
Source	Ranking	As of
The Cook Political Report	Safe D	November 1, 2010
Rothenberg	Safe D	November 1, 2010
Sabato's Crystal Ball	Safe D	November 1, 2010
RCP	Safe D	November 1, 2010
CQ Politics	Safe D	October 28, 2010
New York Times	Safe D	November 1, 2010
FiveThirtyEight	Safe D	November 1, 2010

Maryland's 4th Congressional District: 2010
Party	Candidate	Votes	%	±%
Democratic	Donna Edwards (incumbent)	160,228	83.44%	−2.39
Republican	Robert Broadus	31,467	16.39%	+3.54
No party	Write-ins	325	0.17%	
Total votes		192,020	100.00	
Democratic hold				

== District 5 ==
2010 Maryland's 5th congressional district election
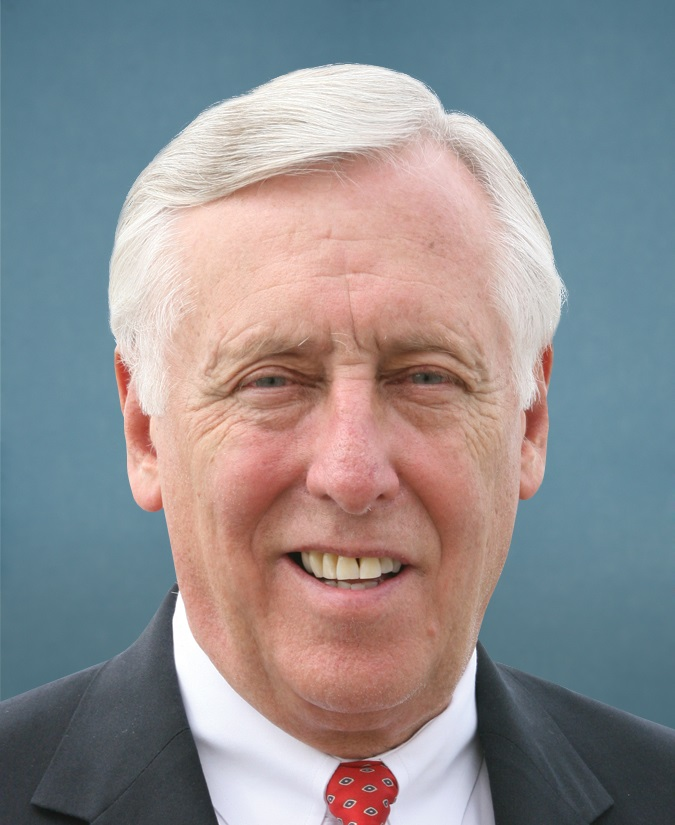

Nominee	Steny Hoyer	Charles Lollar
Party	Democratic	Republican
Popular vote	155,110	83,575
Percentage	64.3%	34.6%
- County results Hoyer: 60–70% 80–90% Lollar: 50–60%
U.S. Representative before election
Steny Hoyer
Democratic
Elected U.S. Representative
Steny Hoyer
Democratic

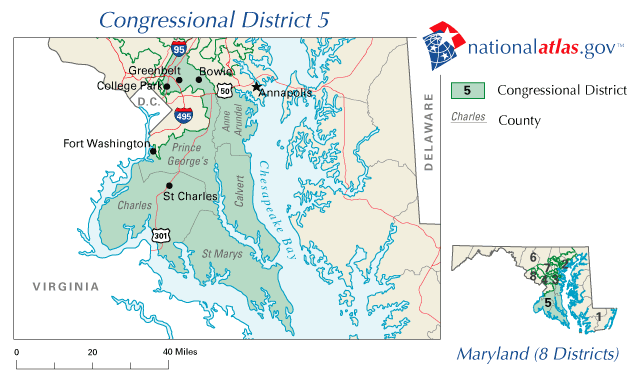

The district comprises all of Charles, St. Mary's, and Calvert Counties, as well as portions of Prince George's and Anne Arundel Counties. The seat had been represented by Democrat and House Majority Leader Steny Hoyer since 1981. He was challenged by Republican Charles Lollar, the Chairman of the Charles County Republican Party, and Libertarian H. Gavin Shickle.

- Race ranking and details from CQ Politics
- Campaign contributions from OpenSecrets
- Race profile at The New York Times

=== Predictions ===
Source	Ranking	As of
The Cook Political Report	Safe D	November 1, 2010
Rothenberg	Safe D	November 1, 2010
Sabato's Crystal Ball	Safe D	November 1, 2010
RCP	Safe D	November 1, 2010
CQ Politics	Safe D	October 28, 2010
New York Times	Safe D	November 1, 2010
FiveThirtyEight	Safe D	November 1, 2010

Maryland's 5th Congressional District: 2010
Party	Candidate	Votes	%	±%
Democratic	Steny Hoyer (incumbent)	155,110	64.26%	−9.39
Republican	Charles Lollar	83,575	34.62%	+10.65
Libertarian	H. Gavin Shickle	2,578	1.07%	−1.20
No party	Write-ins	120	0.05%	
Total votes		241,383	100.00	
Democratic hold				

== District 6 ==
2010 Maryland's 6th congressional district election
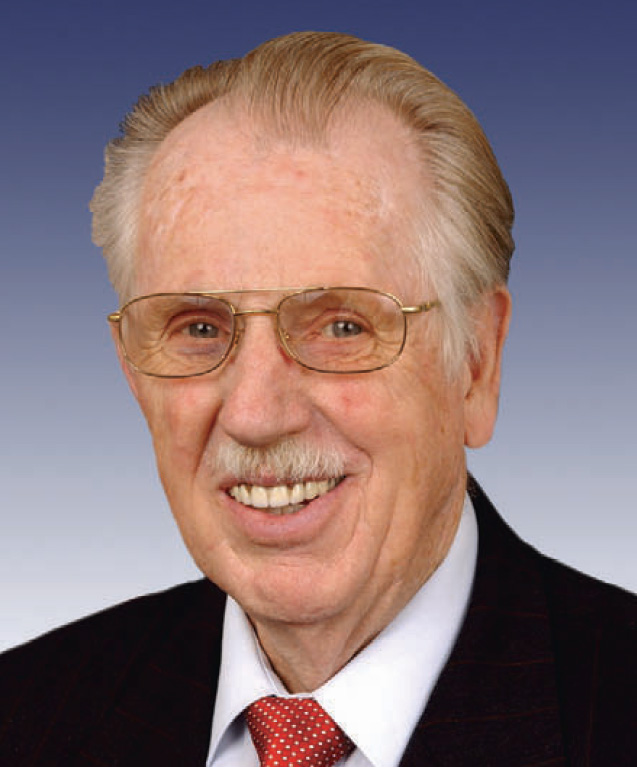

Nominee	Roscoe Bartlett	Andrew Duck
Party	Republican	Democratic
Popular vote	148,820	80,455
Percentage	61.5%	33.2%
- County results Bartlett: 50–60% 60–70% 70–80%
U.S. Representative before election
Roscoe Bartlett
Republican
Elected U.S. Representative
Roscoe Bartlett
Republican

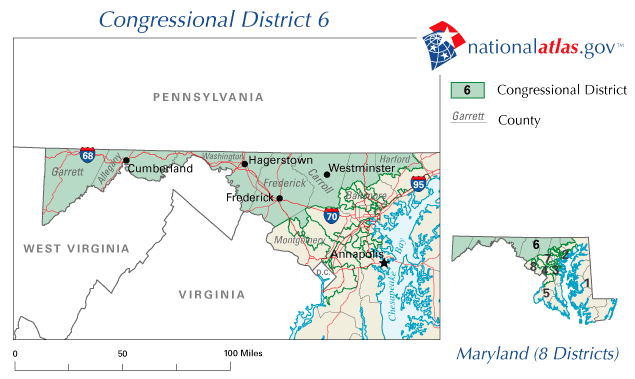

The district comprises all of Garrett, Allegany, Washington, Frederick and Carroll Counties, as well as portions of Montgomery, Baltimore, and Harford Counties, and had been represented by Republican Roscoe Bartlett since 1993. Democrat Andrew J. Duck challenged Roscoe Bartlett in 2010.

- Race ranking and details from CQ Politics
- Campaign contributions from OpenSecrets
- Race profile at The New York Times

=== Predictions ===
Source	Ranking	As of
The Cook Political Report	Safe R	November 1, 2010
Rothenberg	Safe R	November 1, 2010
Sabato's Crystal Ball	Safe R	November 1, 2010
RCP	Safe R	November 1, 2010
CQ Politics	Safe R	October 28, 2010
New York Times	Safe R	November 1, 2010
FiveThirtyEight	Safe R	November 1, 2010

Maryland's 6th Congressional District: 2010
Party	Candidate	Votes	%	±%
Republican	Roscoe Bartlett (incumbent)	148,820	61.45%	+3.69
Democratic	Andrew Duck	80,455	33.22%	−5.57
Libertarian	Dan Massey	6,816	2.81%	−0.54
Constitution	Michael Reed	5,907	2.44%	+2.44
No party	Write-ins	191	0.08%	
Total votes		242,189	100.00	
Republican hold				

== District 7 ==
2010 Maryland's 7th congressional district election
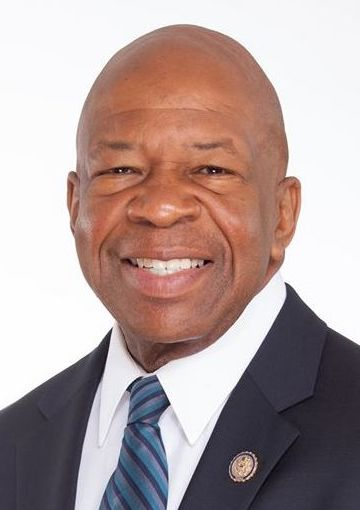

Nominee	Elijah Cummings	Frank C. Mirabile
Party	Democratic	Republican
Popular vote	152,669	46,375
Percentage	75.2%	22.8%
- County results Cummings: 50–60% 70–80% 90–100%
U.S. Representative before election
Elijah Cummings
Democratic
Elected U.S. Representative
Elijah Cummings
Democratic

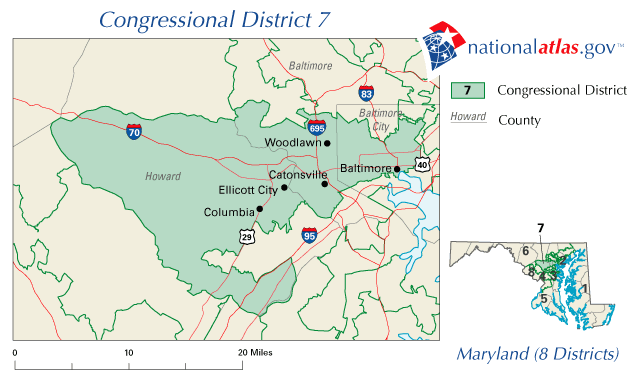

The district encompasses parts of Baltimore City, Baltimore County, and Howard County, and had been represented by Democrat Elijah Cummings since 1996. He was challenged for re-election by Republican Frank Mirabile.

- Race ranking and details from CQ Politics
- Campaign contributions from OpenSecrets
- Race profile at The New York Times

=== Predictions ===
Source	Ranking	As of
The Cook Political Report	Safe D	November 1, 2010
Rothenberg	Safe D	November 1, 2010
Sabato's Crystal Ball	Safe D	November 1, 2010
RCP	Safe D	November 1, 2010
CQ Politics	Safe D	October 28, 2010
New York Times	Safe D	November 1, 2010
FiveThirtyEight	Safe D	November 1, 2010

Maryland's 7th Congressional District: 2010
Party	Candidate	Votes	%	±%
Democratic	Elijah Cummings (incumbent)	152,669	75.18%	−4.32
Republican	Frank C. Mirabile	46,375	22.84%	+4.26
Libertarian	Scott Spencer	3,814	1.88%	+0.06
No party	Write-ins	210	0.10%	
Total votes		203,068	100.00	
Democratic hold				

== District 8 ==
2010 Maryland's 8th congressional district election
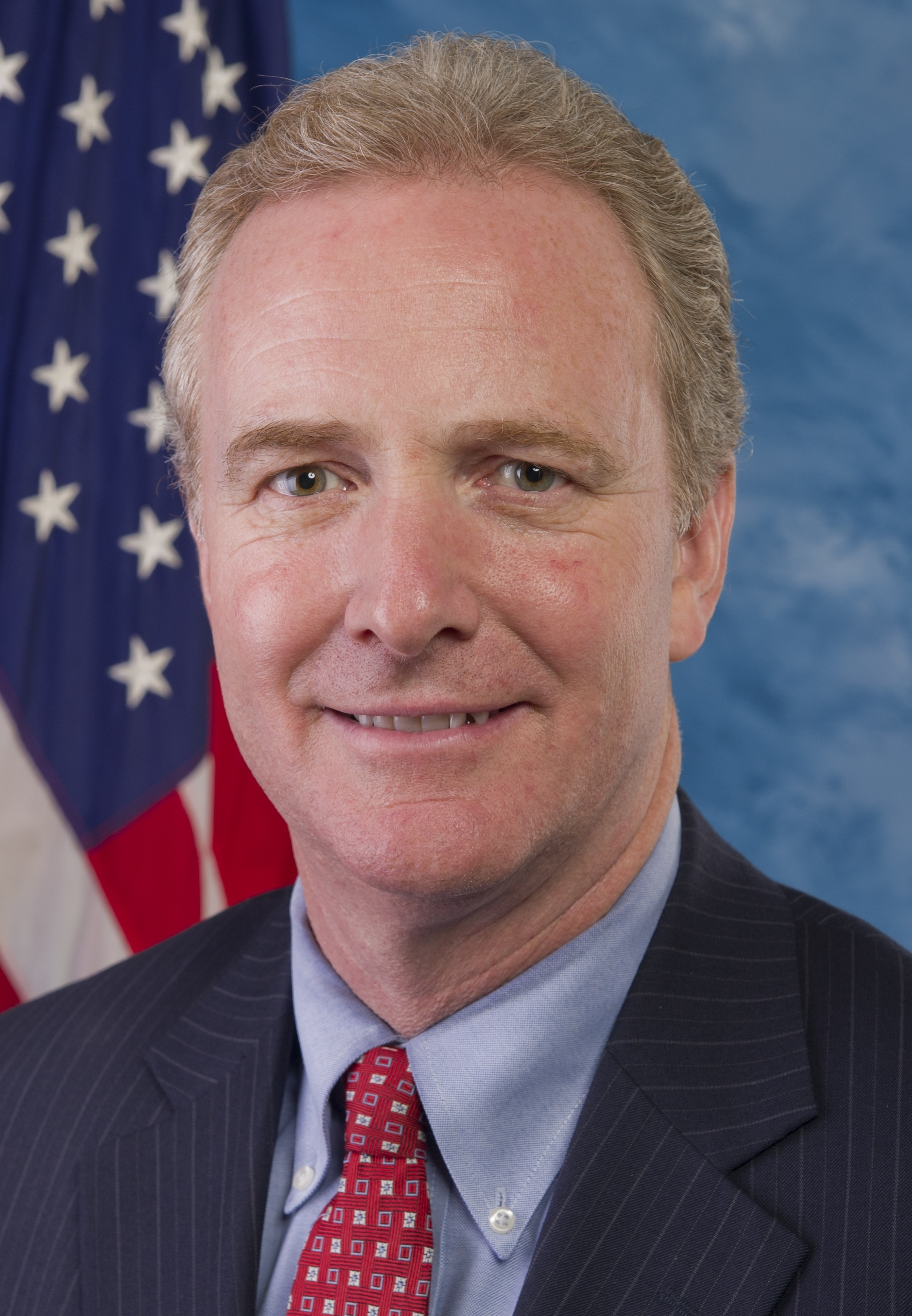

Nominee	Chris Van Hollen	Michael Lee Philips
Party	Democratic	Republican
Popular vote	153,613	52,421
Percentage	73.3%	25.0%
- County results Hollen: 70–80% 90–100%
U.S. Representative before election
Chris Van Hollen
Democratic
Elected U.S. Representative
Chris Van Hollen
Democratic

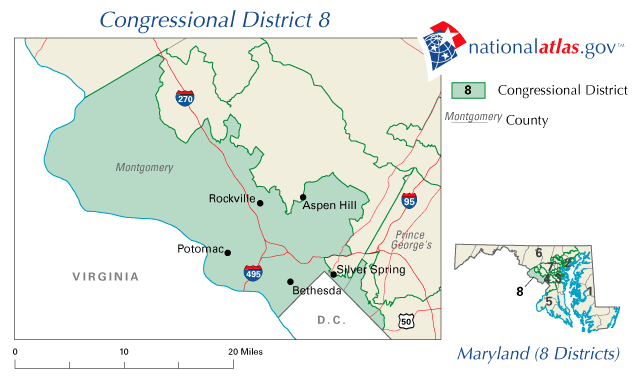

The district mostly consists of the larger part of Montgomery County, but also includes a small portion of Prince George's County, and had been represented by Democrat Chris Van Hollen since 2003. He was challenged by Republican Michael Lee Philips.

- Race ranking and details from CQ Politics
- Campaign contributions from OpenSecrets
- Race profile at The New York Times

=== Predictions ===
Source	Ranking	As of
The Cook Political Report	Safe D	November 1, 2010
Rothenberg	Safe D	November 1, 2010
Sabato's Crystal Ball	Safe D	November 1, 2010
RCP	Safe D	November 1, 2010
CQ Politics	Safe D	October 28, 2010
New York Times	Safe D	November 1, 2010
FiveThirtyEight	Safe D	November 1, 2010

Maryland's 8th Congressional District: 2010
Party	Candidate	Votes	%	±%
Democratic	Chris Van Hollen (incumbent)	153,613	73.27%	−1.81
Republican	Michael Lee Philips	52,421	25.00%	+3.32
Libertarian	Mark Grannis	2,713	1.29%	+0.45
Constitution	Fred Nordhorn	696	0.33%	+0.33
No party	Write-ins	224	0.11%	
Total votes		209,667	100.00	
Democratic hold				

Preceded by 2008 elections	United States House elections in Maryland; 2010	Succeeded by 2012 elections
