= 2008 Maryland's 4th congressional district special election =

- June 17, 2008
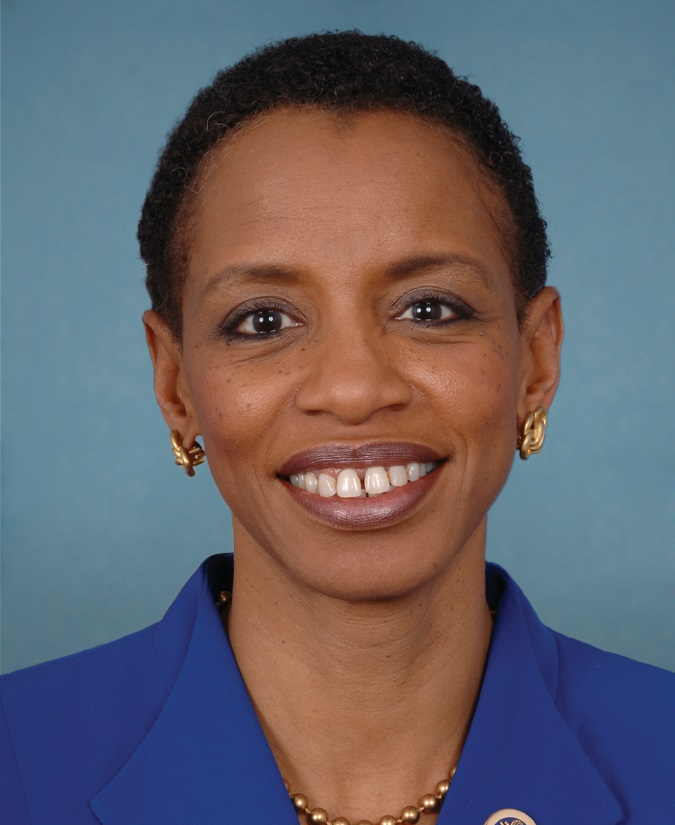

Candidate	Donna Edwards	Peter James
Party	Democratic	Republican
Popular vote	16,481	3,638
Percentage	80.54%	17.78%
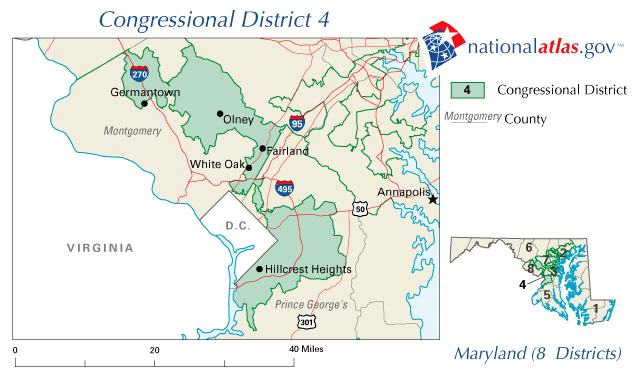
Representative before election
Albert Wynn
Democratic
Elected Representative
Donna Edwards
Democratic

Maryland's 4th congressional district special election of 2008 took place on June 17, 2008, to fill the seat in the United States House of Representatives left vacant by the resignation of Maryland congressman Albert Wynn. Democrat Donna Edwards won the election by a large margin.

== Background ==
Maryland's 4th congressional district seat was vacant after Congressman Albert Wynn resigned on May 31, 2008. Maryland Governor Martin O'Malley announced that a special election would be held on June 17, 2008, to fill the seat for the remainder of the 110th Congress. In order to save time and money, O'Malley signed legislation to allow the Democratic and Republican parties to choose candidates by committee instead of holding primaries. As expected, both parties chose the November general election nominees (who had already been nominated in primaries for that election) as their respective June special election candidates so that either winner would be positioned to run as the party incumbent in November.

Election officials estimated the cost for holding the special election ranged from $1.05 to $1.25 million, which was borne by the taxpayers of the 4th District.

== Candidates ==
- Donna Edwards (D), attorney, Democratic general election nominee, 2006 Democratic candidate for Congress
- Peter James (R), public Advocate, Republican general election nominee
- Thibeaux Lincecum (L)

== Results ==
Maryland's 4th congressional district special election, 2008
Party	Candidate	Votes	%
Democratic	Donna Edwards	16,481	80.54
Republican	Peter James	3,638	17.78
Libertarian	Thibeaux Lincecum	216	1.06
Write-ins		127	0.62
Total votes		20,462	100.00
Democratic hold			

== See also ==
- List of special elections to the United States House of Representatives
