= Arca Foundation =

- Predecessor: Nancy Reynolds Bagley Foundation
- Formation: 1952
- Founder: Nancy Susan Reynolds
- Type: Foundation
- Location: Washington, D.C.
- Methods: Grantmaking
- Executive Director: Jennifer Pae
- Board of directors: Margery Tabankin
- Key people: R. J. Reynolds, Donna Edwards
- Endowment: $49 million (2023)
- Website: www.arcafoundation.org

The Arca Foundation is a progressive American philanthropic foundation. Founded in 1952 as the Nancy Reynolds Bagley Foundation, the foundation was renamed the Arca Foundation in 1958. The foundation was founded with assets from the R. J. Reynolds Tobacco Company. The foundation was formerly headed by Democrat Donna Edwards, who in 2008 took a leave of absence from Arca to run successfully for Maryland's 4th congressional district.

In the 1980s, the Arca Foundation funded lobbying efforts against U.S. policy in Central America. Since 1994, the Arca Foundation has donated millions of dollars to organizations working to lift sanctions against Cuba and normalize relations between Cuba and the United States.
