= Albert Wynn =

American politician (born 1951)

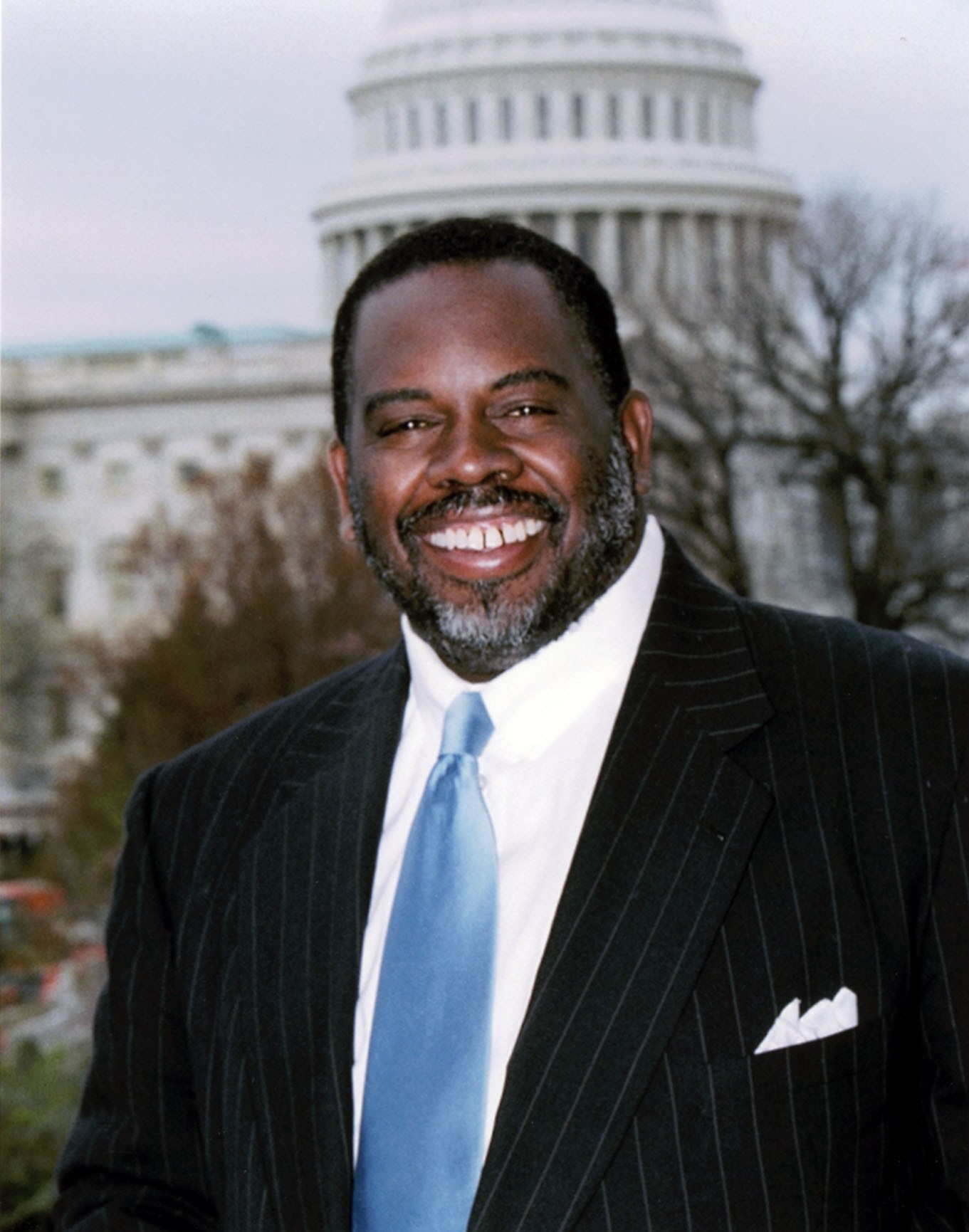

Member of the U.S. House of Representatives from Maryland's 4th district
- In office January 3, 1993 – May 31, 2008
- Preceded by: Constituency established
- Succeeded by: Donna Edwards

Member of the Maryland Senate from the 25th district
- In office January 14, 1987 – January 4, 1993
- Preceded by: Mike Donovan
- Succeeded by: Beatrice Tignor

Member of the Maryland House of Delegates from the 25th district
- In office January 12, 1983 – January 14, 1987

Personal details
- Born: Albert Russell Wynn; September 10, 1951 (age 75) Philadelphia, Pennsylvania, U.S.
- Party: Democratic
- Spouse(s): Jessie Wynn (divorced) Gaines Clore (died)
- Education: University of Pittsburgh (BA); Howard University; Georgetown University (JD)

Albert Russell Wynn (born September 10, 1951) is an American lobbyist and former politician who served as a member of the United States House of Representatives, representing the 4th district of Maryland from 1993 to 2008. On February 13, 2008, Wynn was defeated in the Democratic primary by Donna Edwards, and resigned his office effective May 31, 2008.

== Early life and education ==
Wynn was born in Montgomery County, Pennsylvania. He was educated at the University of Pittsburgh, Howard University, and Georgetown University Law Center. While attending the University of Pittsburgh, Wynn was initiated as a member of the Beta Epsilon chapter of Kappa Alpha Psi fraternity.

Soon after graduating, Wynn became director of the Prince George's County Consumer Protection Commission. In 1982, he founded his own law firm. He then spent a decade in the Maryland General Assembly, serving in the state house from 1983 to 1987 and in the state senate from 1987 to 1993.

== Career ==
Wynn entered the Democratic primary for the 4th district in 1992. The 4th district had been reconfigured as a black-majority district after the 1990 Census, and the previous incumbent, three-term Democrat Tom McMillen, had been drawn out of the district. Wynn won a crowded seven-way primary by 1,300 votes, all but assuring him of election in the heavily Democratic district. He won the general election in November with 75 percent of the vote and was reelected seven times, never dropping below 75 percent of the vote.

Wynn was a member of the House Energy and Commerce Committee, where he chaired the Subcommittee on the Environment and Hazardous Materials. Wynn placed a high priority on economic issues. Wynn also supported the energy bill promoted by Vice President and former Halliburton CEO Dick Cheney.

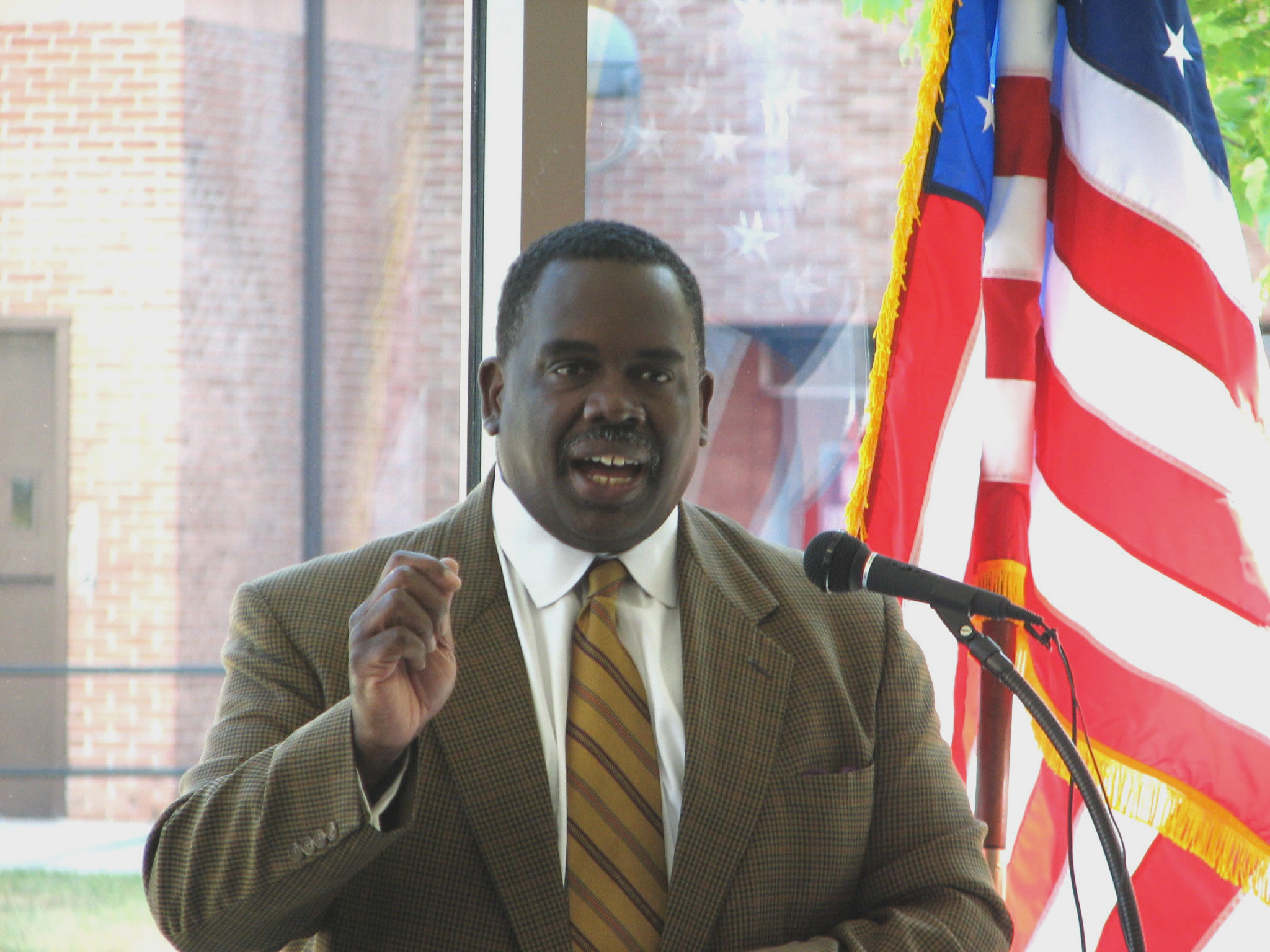
Congressman Wynn pledges his support for Prince George's Hospital Center.

During the 105th Congress, Wynn sponsored legislation passed to improve federal contracting opportunities for small and minority businesses. He has twice received the Small Business Administration Administrator's Leadership Award for his efforts on behalf of small businesses.

His 2000 re-election race made headlines, when the Congressman's estranged wife, Jessie Wynn, served as the campaign manager for his Republican opponent, John B. Kimble. In radio spots for Kimble's campaign, Mrs. Wynn stated "Albert Wynn does not respect black women. He left me for the white woman."

During the 107th Congress, Wynn was one of only four of 36 Congressional Black Caucus members who voted on October 10, 2002 for the joint resolution authorizing the Iraq War. The other three Congressional Black Caucus members who voted for the resolution authorizing the Iraq War were Bill Jefferson of Louisiana, Sanford Bishop of Georgia, and Harold Ford, Jr. of Tennessee. Wynn also served on the Congressional Black Caucus' Political Action Committee and its Minority Business Task Force.

Wynn has issued statements of support for integrating illegal aliens into society, so long as strong border security provisions are included. He spoke at the Washington, D.C. Immigration Rally in April 2006, condemning H. R. 4437 and other bills that aim to deport all illegal immigrants. On Wynn's official website, he says "Now that they are in this country, we owe them respect and fair treatment."

=== 2006 congressional elections ===
In 2006, he was challenged in the Democratic primary by community activist Donna Edwards, most recently executive director of the Arca Foundation. Edwards, who had clerked for Wynn in the 1980s while he served in the state legislature, criticized Wynn for his votes to support the Iraq war, repeal of the estate tax, support of the Bankruptcy Reform Act of 2005, and of the Bush Administration's energy bill, arguing that he was too conservative and too closely allied with Republicans. While Wynn was initially heavily favored, Edwards showed surprising strength. Two weeks before the primary, The Washington Post endorsed Edwards.

The primary was held on September 12, and when all the votes had been counted, Wynn defeated Edwards by 49.7 percent to 46.4 percent — by 2,725 votes out of more than 82,000 cast. George McDermott, a little-known candidate, took 3.9 percent. The final tally of the primary was unclear for nearly two weeks because of widespread voting problems on new electronic voting machines in Montgomery and Prince George’s counties.

=== 2008 congressional elections ===
Edwards sought a rematch in 2008. This time, Edwards won the backing of the influential MoveOn.org. Edwards also had the support of many progressive community organizations, and many influential netroots organizations such as Daily Kos and OpenLeft.

In the primary, Edwards routed Wynn, 60 percent to 36 percent.

=== Resignation ===
On March 27, 2008, Wynn announced his resignation from Congress effective in June.

Edwards was elected in a special election to finish out the rest of Wynn's term, defeating anti-war Republican primary winner Peter James in the general election in November 2008.

=== Post-congressional career ===
He became a partner of Dickstein Shapiro, a large lobbying firm whose clients include the tobacco, entertainment, energy, and software industries as well as the Teamsters. Because House rules prohibit former members from lobbying current members of Congress for one year after departing, Wynn began lobbying Congress in June 2009 instead of in January 2010 due to his early resignation.

== Election history ==
Year	Office	Election	Subject	Party	Votes	%	Opponent	Party	Votes	%	Opponent	Party	Votes	%
1992	Congress, 4th district	General	Al Wynn	Democratic	136,902	75.14	Michelle Dyson	Republican	45,166	24.79				
1994	Congress, 4th district	General	Al Wynn	Democratic	93,148	75.03	Michelle Dyson	Republican	30,999	24.97				
1996	Congress, 4th district	General	Al Wynn	Democratic	142,094	85.19	John B. Kimble	Republican	24,700	14.81				
1998	Congress, 4th district	General	Al Wynn	Democratic	129,139	85.72	John B. Kimble	Republican	21,518	14.28				
2000	Congress, 4th district	General	Al Wynn	Democratic	172,624	87.2	John B. Kimble	Republican	24,973	12.61				
2002	Congress, 4th district	General	Al Wynn	Democratic	131,644	78.57	John B. Kimble	Republican	34,890	20.82				
2004	Congress, 4th district	General	Al Wynn	Democratic	196,809	75.16	John McKinnis	Republican	52,907	20.2	Theresa Dudley	Green	11,885	4.54
2006	Congress, 4th district	Primary	Al Wynn	Democratic	40,857	49.7	Donna Edwards	Democratic	38,126	46.4	George McDermott	Democratic	3,200	3.9
2006	Congress, 4th district	General	Al Wynn	Democratic	141,897	80.67	Michael Moshe Starkman	Republican	32,792	18.64				
2008	Congress, 4th district	Primary	Al Wynn	Democratic	48,885	36.9	Donna Edwards	Democratic	78,008	58.9	Others	Democratic	5,641	4.2

== See also ==
- List of African-American United States representatives

U.S. House of Representatives
Preceded by C. Thomas McMillen	Member of the U.S. House of Representatives from Maryland's 4th congressional district 1993–2008	Succeeded by Donna Edwards
U.S. order of precedence (ceremonial)
Preceded by Marty Meehan as Former U.S. Representative	Order of precedence of the United States as Former U.S. Representative	Succeeded by Jeff Duncan as Former U.S. Representative
