= Donna Edwards =

American politician (born 1958)

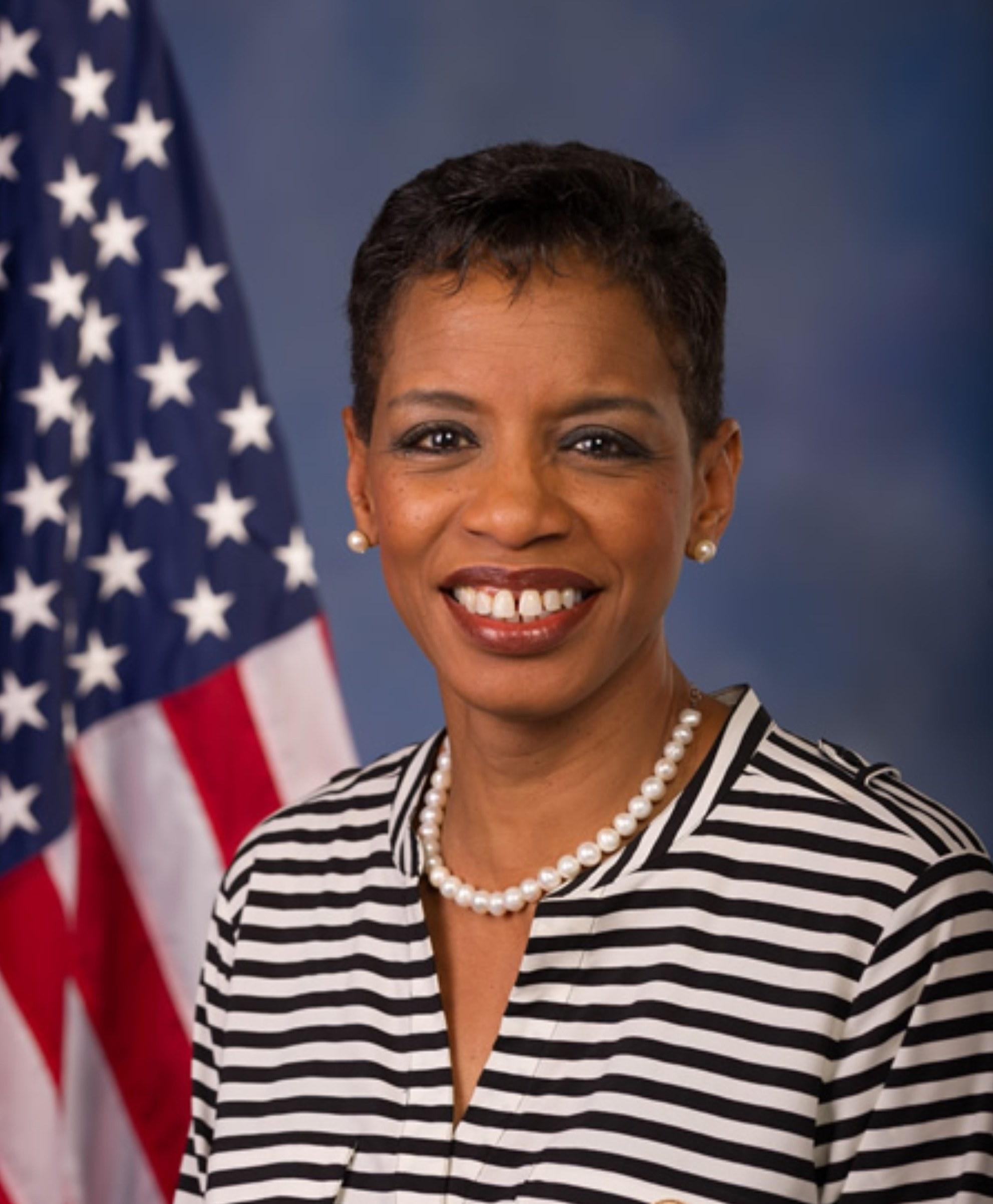

Member of the U.S. House of Representatives from Maryland's 4th district
- In office June 17, 2008 – January 3, 2017 (Note: Edwards's official service begins on the date of the special election, while she was not sworn in until June 19, 2008.)
- Preceded by: Albert Wynn
- Succeeded by: Anthony Brown

Personal details
- Born: Donna Fern Edwards; June 28, 1958 (age 68) Yanceyville, North Carolina, U.S.
- Party: Democratic
- Education: Wake Forest University (BA); University of New Hampshire (JD)

Donna Fern Edwards (born June 28, 1958) is an American politician who served as the U.S. representative for Maryland's 4th congressional district from 2008 to 2017. The district included most of Prince George's County, as well as part of Anne Arundel County. She is a member of the Democratic Party.

A lawyer and longtime community activist, she defeated eight-term incumbent Albert Wynn in the 2008 Democratic primary and, following his resignation, won a special election on June 17, 2008, to fill the remainder of this term. She was sworn in two days later on June 19, becoming the first African-American woman to represent Maryland in the United States Congress. Edwards ran for a full term in November 2008, defeating Republican candidate Peter James with 85% of the vote. She ran for U.S. Senate in 2016 in the primary to replace retiring Barbara Mikulski instead of running for re-election to her Congressional seat but was defeated by Congressman Chris Van Hollen in the Democratic primary. In 2022, Edwards ran for the congressional seat she previously held but lost to Glenn Ivey in the Democratic primary.

In 2013, she sponsored an amendment to the U.S. Constitution that would repeal the 2010 Supreme Court ruling in Citizens United v. Federal Election Commission.

== Early life, education, and career ==
Edwards was born in Yanceyville, North Carolina. She earned B.A. degrees in English and Spanish from Wake Forest University, where she was one of only six black women in the class of 1980. After working for Lockheed Corporation at the Goddard Space Flight Center with the Spacelab program, she attended and earned a J.D. in 1989 from the Franklin Pierce Law Center (now known as the University of New Hampshire School of Law). Edwards worked for Albert Wynn as a clerk in the 1980s, when he served in the Maryland House of Delegates.

== Activism ==
Edwards co-founded and served as the first executive director of the National Network to End Domestic Violence, an advocacy and legal support group for battered women. She worked to pass the 1994 Violence Against Women Act.

She later worked with Public Citizen, and then as the executive director of the Center for a New Democracy. In 2000, she became the executive director of the Arca Foundation, taking a leave of absence during her political campaign.

In the spring of 2015, Edwards, along with several other members of the House of Representatives, introduced the Restoring Education and Learning Act (REAL Act) to bring back Pell Grants to prisoners. Edwards' press release outlines numerous advantages to prisoner education, including net benefits to taxpayers who bear the costs of recidivism.

Edwards is a national co-chair of the progressive group Health Care Voter. She is also an honorary member of the Zeta Phi Beta sorority, which historically focuses on social causes.

== U.S. House of Representatives ==
=== Elections ===
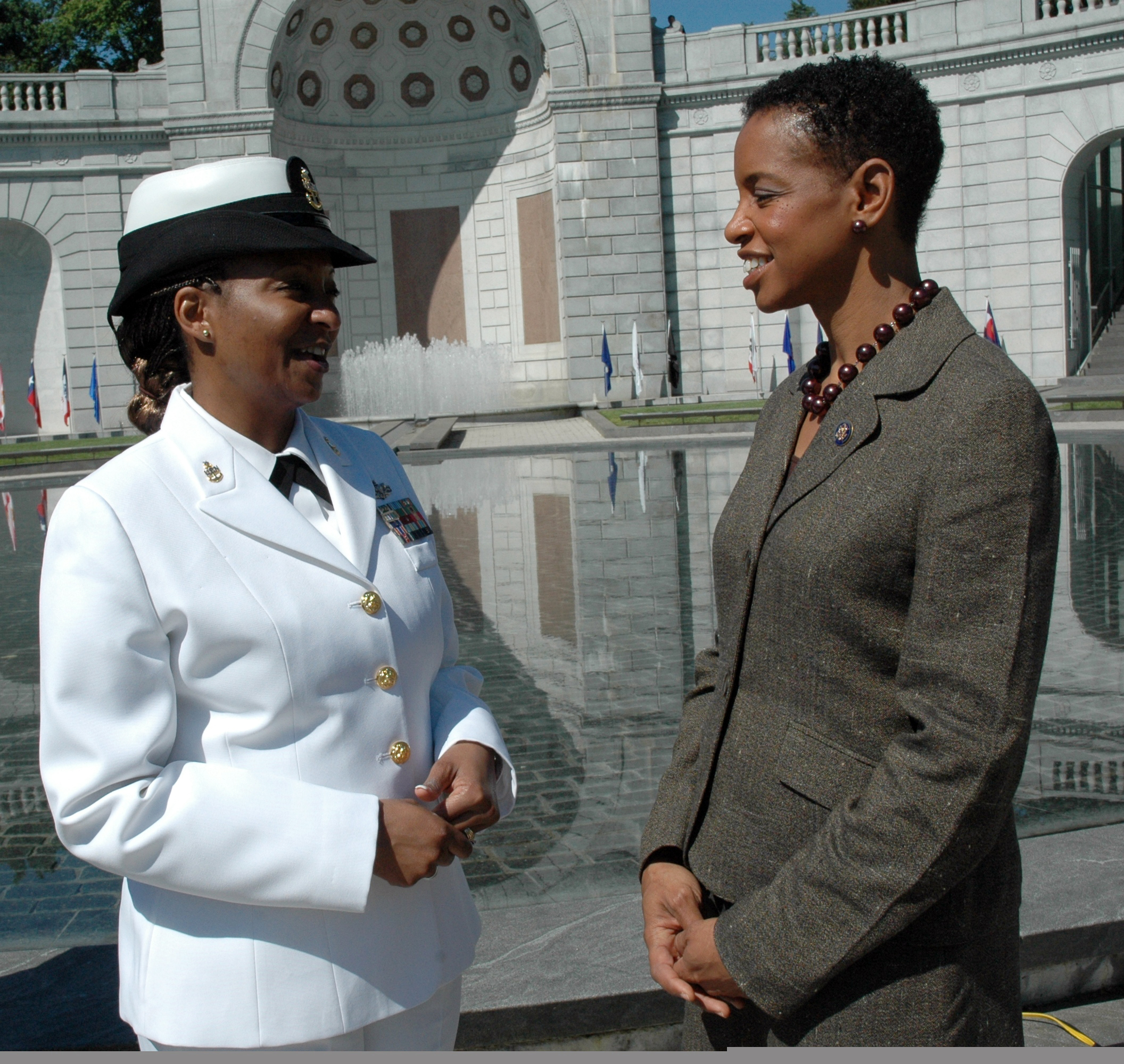
Edwards speaking with a U.S. Navy sailor in May 2009

==== 2006 ====
Edwards challenged seven-term incumbent Al Wynn in the 2006 Democratic primary – the real contest in this heavily Democratic, black-majority district. Edwards focused primarily on Wynn's voting record. Wynn, considered a conservative by African-American Democratic standards, was one of four Congressional Black Caucus members that voted for the 2002 Iraq War resolution. Edwards condemned the war before it started. Wynn eventually began to say he was misled by the Bush Administration and his vote was a mistake. Edwards opposed the repeal of the estate tax, which Wynn voted for. Similarly, Edwards criticized Wynn's vote for the bankruptcy bill of 2005, which eliminated some bankruptcy protections for individuals. Wynn supported the energy bill promoted by Vice President and former Halliburton CEO Dick Cheney. Wynn opposed the net neutrality bill of 2006, which Edwards supports.

On August 16, 2006, before a debate at Prince George's Community College, an altercation occurred between Wynn's staffers and an Edwards volunteer, leaving the volunteer with a bloody gash to the head. This event brought much media attention to the race.

On August 30, 2006, The Washington Post endorsed Edwards in the primary race.

The primary was held on September 12, 2006. Wynn defeated Edwards by 49.7 percent to 46.4 percent, with a margin of 2,725 votes out of more than 82,000 cast. George McDermott, a little-known candidate, took 3.9 percent. The final tally of the primary was unclear for nearly two weeks because of widespread voting problems on new electronic voting machines in Montgomery and Prince George's counties.

==== 2008 special ====
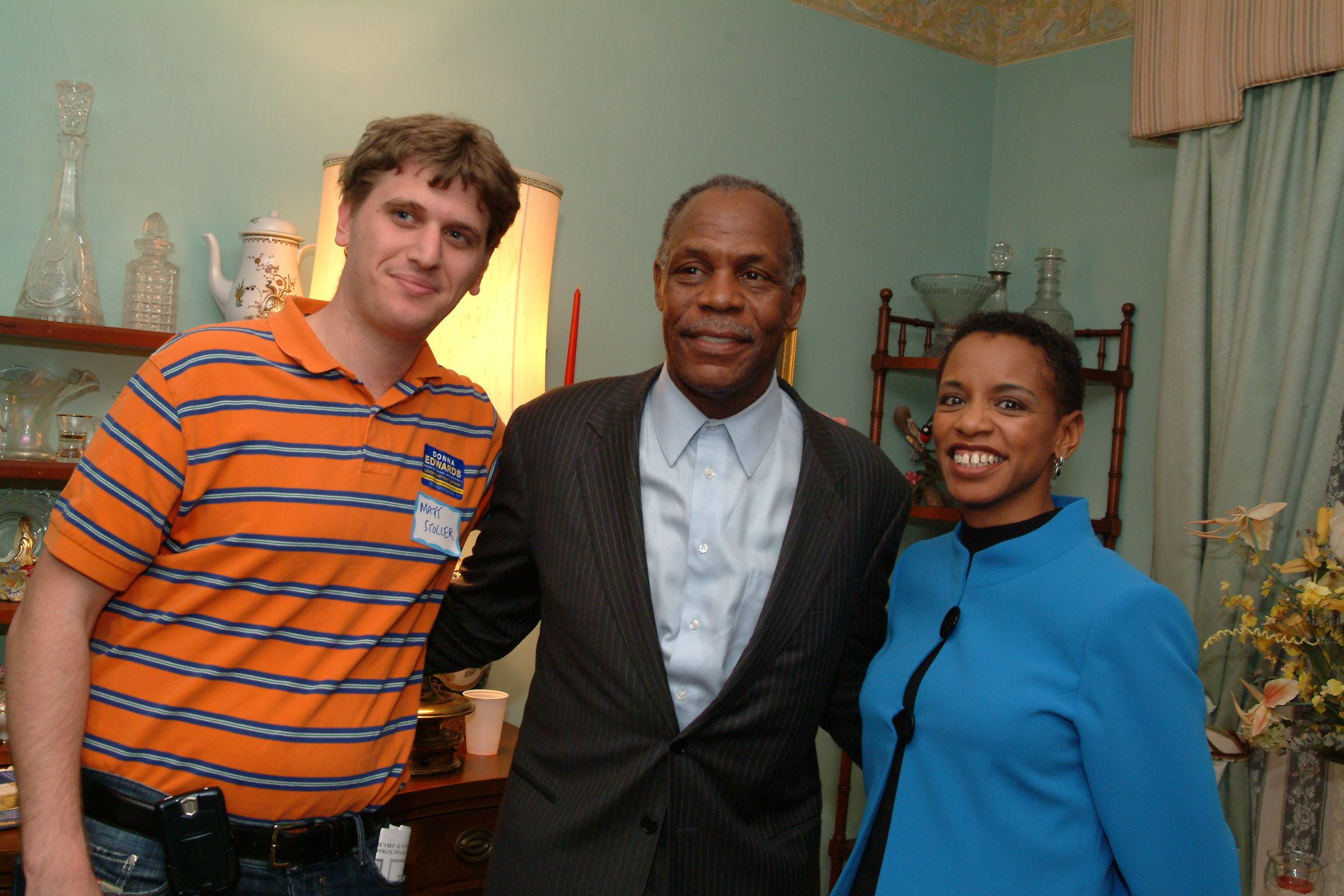
Edwards with Danny Glover and Matt Stoller, January 2008

In 2008, Edwards again challenged Wynn for his seat in the Democratic primary. During the 2008 campaign, Edwards accused Wynn of being out of touch with the community and of accepting hundreds of thousands of dollars of corporate money. Wynn counter-attacked Edwards as hypocritical, citing the fact that she served as executive director of the Arca Foundation, an organization that has invested millions of dollars in oil and gas companies.

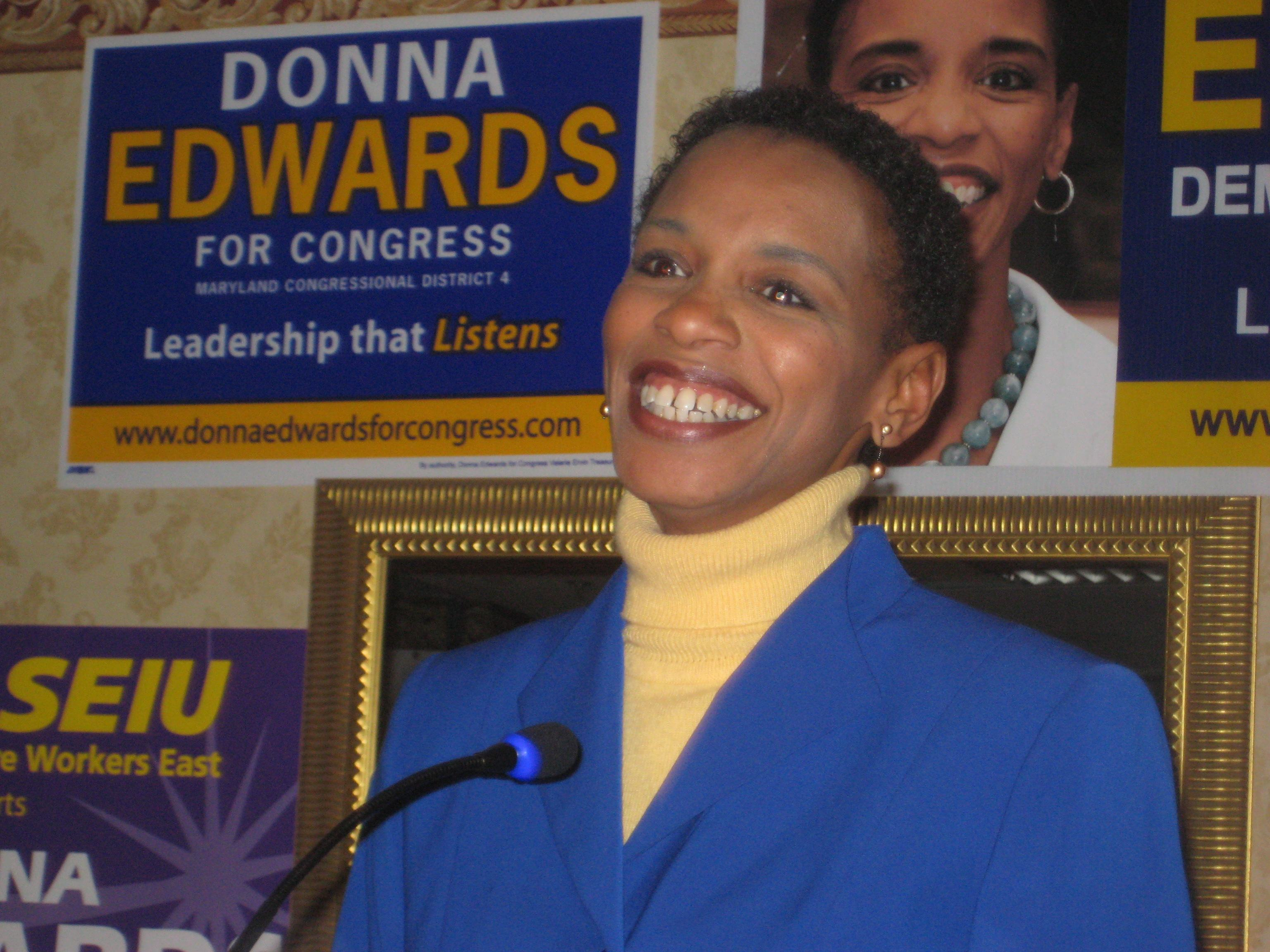
Edwards at her victory rally on February 13, 2008

In the February 12, 2008, primary, Edwards defeated the eight-term incumbent in a rout, taking 60% of the vote to Wynn's 35%. The win virtually assured her of victory in the heavily Democratic district in November.

After the primary, Wynn announced he would resign effective June 2008. Edwards won the Democratic nomination for the June 17, 2008, special election to serve out the last six months of Wynn's term.

As expected, Edwards easily won the special election, taking 81 percent of the vote over Republican Peter James and Libertarian Thibeaux Lincecum. She took office two days later, giving her a leg-up on seniority over any new congresspersons who were elected in 2008.

==== 2008 ====
Edwards ran for a full term in November 2008 and was an overwhelming favorite; a Republican has never tallied more than 25 percent of the vote in the 4th district since it assumed its current configuration after the 1990 Census. Indeed, many of the 4th district's residents already thought of her as the district's congresswoman even before the special election. As expected, Edwards easily won a full term with 85 percent of the vote, one of the highest percentages in the nation for a Democrat facing major-party opposition.

==== 2010 ====
Edwards won against Delegate Herman L. Taylor Jr. in the September 2010 primary, and then defeated Republican Robert Broadus with 83 percent of the vote in the general election.

==== 2012 ====
Edwards won against George McDermott and Ian Garner in the Democratic primary, and then defeated Republican Faith M. Loudon and Libertarian Scott Soffen with 77 percent of the vote in the general election.

==== 2014 ====
Edwards won against Warren Christopher in the Democratic primary, and then defeated Republican Nancy Hoyt and Libertarian Arvin Vohra with 70 percent of the vote in the general election.

==== 2022 ====
After Anthony Brown's announcement that he would not be running for re-election to Congress in order to run for state attorney general, Edwards announced on January 20, 2022, that she would be running in the 2022 U.S. House elections for her old seat, Maryland's 4th congressional district. United Democracy Project, a super PAC associated with the American Israel Public Affairs Committee, ran nearly $6 million worth of advertising attacking Edwards during the primary election cycle. Her successful opponent, former Prince George's County State's Attorney Glenn Ivey, also received almost half of his campaign contributions from donors associated with AIPAC. Edwards was supported by $720,000 from the J Street PAC, and $550,000 from the League of Conservation Voters. The New York Times described the race as a "proxy fight over Israel".

While there was heavy outside spending in the 2022 Democratic primary, Edwards went from a 13-point lead to trailing Ivey by 5 points as of early June, weeks before United Democracy Project began running TV ads on June 17. Edwards received 35 percent of the vote, while Ivey received 52 percent.

=== Tenure ===
==== Arrest during Darfur protest in Washington, D.C. ====
On April 27, 2009, Rep. Donna Edwards was arrested outside the Sudan embassy during a protest against genocide in Darfur. The Representative and five other U.S. Congressional Representatives were protesting the blocking of aid to victims. They were arrested after ignoring warnings issued by police maintaining a police line to protect the embassy in Washington, D.C.

The other U.S. lawmakers arrested during the protest were Reps. Jim McGovern (D-Massachusetts), Keith Ellison (D-Minnesota), Rep. John Lewis (D-Georgia), Rep. Jim Moran (D-Virginia), and Lynn Woolsey (D-California).

=== Committee assignments ===
- Committee on Science, Space and Technology
  - Subcommittee on Space and Aeronautics (Ranking Member)
  - Subcommittee on Environment
- Committee on Transportation and Infrastructure
  - Subcommittee on Economic Development, Public Buildings and Emergency Management
  - Subcommittee on Highways and Transit
  - Subcommittee on Water Resources and Environment

=== Caucus memberships ===
- Populist Caucus
- Congressional Progressive Caucus

== Other campaigns ==
=== 2016 U.S Senate campaign in Maryland ===
Edwards and Rep. Chris Van Hollen (D-MD) faced off in the Democratic primary for the U.S. Senate seat to be vacated by Barbara Mikulski's (D) retirement. She lost the primary election on April 26, 2016. Edwards received 39 percent of the vote, while Van Hollen received 53 percent. Since she had run for the Senate seat, instead of for reelection to her Congressional seat, Edwards left public office when her term expired in January 2017, and was succeeded by former lieutenant governor Anthony Brown.

=== 2018 Prince George County Executive campaign ===
Edwards ran for Prince George's County Executive but lost to Angela Alsobrooks in the Democratic primary, despite benefitting from an outside group that spent nearly $1 million to support Edwards and ran what The Washington Post editorial board deemed a "smear campaign". Edwards received 24 percent of the vote, while Alsobrooks received 62 percent.

== Personal life ==
Edwards lives in Oxon Hill, Maryland.

On July 7, 2017, she announced that she had been diagnosed with multiple sclerosis. Edwards went on MSNBC programs to speak about how she believed the current health care bill that was up for a vote would affect her as a person with multiple sclerosis, and would affect other people with pre-existing conditions. She also penned an op-ed on the subject for The Washington Post.

Since her tenure as a U.S. representative, Edwards has held leadership positions in several non-profit organization boards and became a senior fellow of the Brennan Center for Justice. She has written columns for The Washington Post and continues to express her political views as a regular commentator for NBC and MSNBC.

== See also ==
- List of African-American United States representatives
- List of African-American United States Senate candidates
- Women in the United States House of Representatives

== Notes ==
U.S. House of Representatives
Preceded by Albert Wynn	Member of the U.S. House of Representatives from Maryland's 4th congressional district 2008–2017	Succeeded by Anthony Brown
Party political offices
Preceded by Gwen Moore; Debbie Wasserman Schultz	Chair of the Democratic Women's Working Group; 2013–2015	Succeeded by Doris Matsui
Preceded by George Miller	Chair of the House Democratic Policy Committee; 2015–2017	Succeeded by Eric Swalwell
U.S. order of precedence (ceremonial)
Preceded by Michael D. Barnes as Former U.S. Representative	Order of precedence of the United States as Former U.S. Representative	Succeeded by Gresham Barrett as Former U.S. Representative
