= Senator Stump =

Senator Stump may refer to:

- Bob Stump (1927–2003), Arizona State Senate
- Herman Stump (1837–1917), Maryland State Senate
- LeRoy Stumpf (born 1944), Minnesota State Senate
