= John Mays Little =

American politician (died 1950)

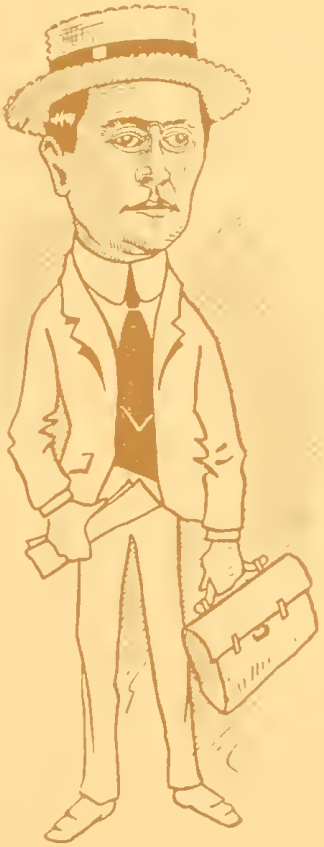
- Caricature of Little in 1916 publication

Member of the Maryland House of Delegates from the Baltimore County district
- In office 1908–1908 Serving with Carville Benson, William F. Coghlan, Michael P. Kehoe, W. George Marley, Charles M. Snyder

Personal details
- Born: c. 1876
- Died: December 31, 1950 (aged 74) Parkton, Maryland, U.S.
- Resting place: Druid Ridge Cemetery; Baltimore, Maryland, U.S.
- Party: Democratic
- Spouse: Marie C. Cherry (died 1949)
- Children: 1
- Education: Western Maryland College (BA); University of Maryland School of Law
- Occupation: Politician; lawyer; bank president

John Mays Little (c. 1876 – December 31, 1950) was an American politician, lawyer and bank president from Maryland. He served as a member of the Maryland House of Delegates, representing Baltimore County in 1908.

== Early life ==
John Mays Little was born to Emma (née Mays) and William Little. He graduated with a Bachelor of Arts degree from Western Maryland College. He played varsity football there. He graduated with a law degree from the University of Maryland School of Law. He was admitted to the bar in 1903.

== Career ==
Little taught school. He started practicing law in 1903. He practiced law alongside Frank I. Duncan.

Little was a Democrat. He served as a member of the Maryland House of Delegates, representing Baltimore County in 1908.

Little founded the First National Bank of Preston around 1912. He served as bank president. He retired from that role in 1950. He was a member of the Maryland National Guard.

== Personal life ==
Little married Marie C. Cherry. They married at the governor's mansion in Mobile, Alabama. They had one son, John Jr. His wife died in 1949.

Little died on December 31, 1950, at the age of 74, at his home in Parkton, Maryland. He was buried at Druid Ridge Cemetery in Baltimore.
