= Carl Sheridan =

Carl Sheridan may refer to:

- Carl V. Sheridan (1925–1944), United States Army soldier and Medal of Honor recipient
- Carl A. Sheridan (1908–1989), American attorney, government official and politician
