= Frank T. Shaw =

American politician

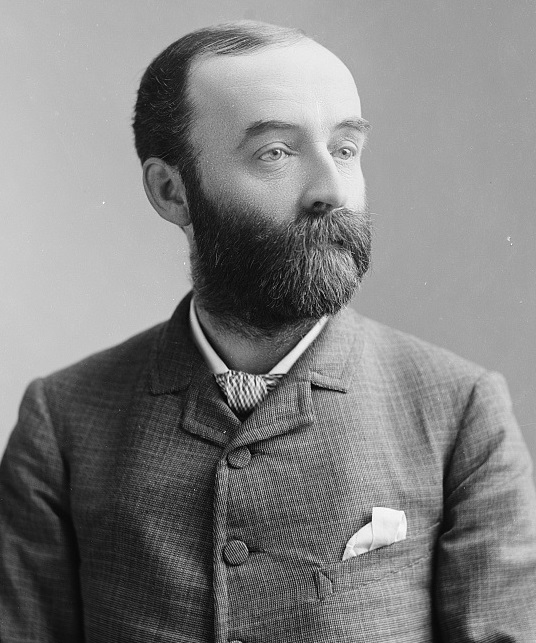
1886 photo of Shaw by C. M. Bell Studio (Washington, DC)

Frank Thomas Shaw (October 7, 1841 – February 24, 1923) was an American politician.

Shaw was born in Woodsboro, Maryland, and attended the common schools. He graduated from the medical department of the University of Maryland, Baltimore in 1864, and practiced medicine in Uniontown, Maryland, until November 1873. He was elected clerk of the circuit court for Carroll County, Maryland, in 1873, was reelected in 1879, and served until 1885, when he resigned.

Shaw was elected as a Democrat to the 49th and 50th Congresses, serving from March 4, 1885, to March 3, 1889. During the 50th Congress, Shaw was chairman of the Committee on Accounts. He was an unsuccessful candidate for renomination in 1888.

Shaw was elected to the Maryland House of Delegates in 1890. He served as State tax commissioner from 1890 to 1894, and was appointed by President Grover Cleveland as collector of customs for the Port of Baltimore, serving in that position from May 5, 1894, to May 24, 1898. He was also adviser to the clerk of the circuit court from 1915 to 1921. He resided in Westminster, Maryland, until his death, and is interred in Westminster Cemetery.

U.S. House of Representatives
Preceded by Joshua Frederick Cockey Talbott	Member of the U.S. House of Representatives from Maryland's 2nd congressional district 1885–1889	Succeeded by Herman Stump
