= Carville Benson =

American politician and lawyer (1872–1929)

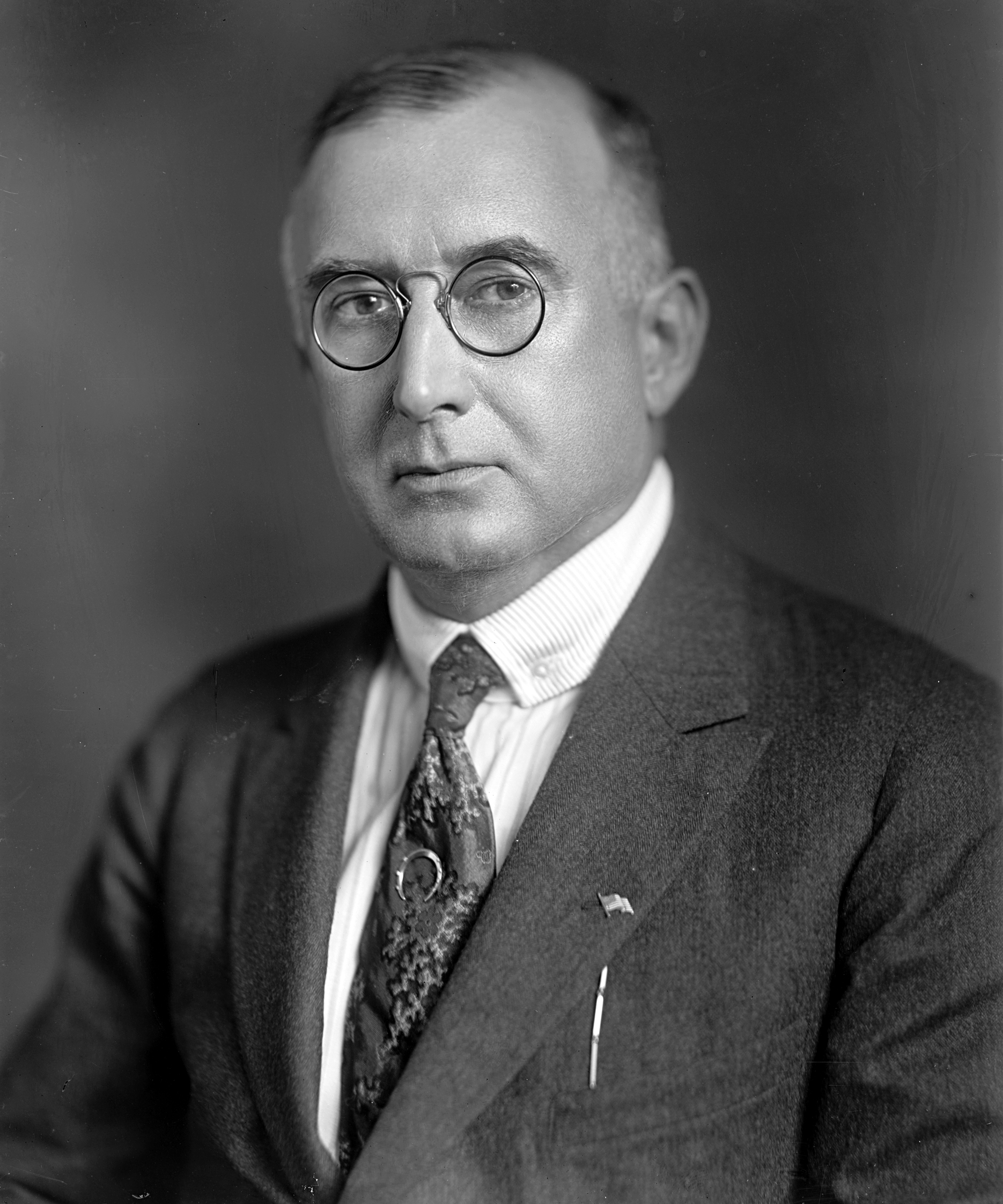

Member of the U.S. House of Representatives from Maryland's 2nd district
- In office November 5, 1918 – March 3, 1921
- Preceded by: Frederick Talbott
- Succeeded by: Albert Blakeney

Member of the Maryland State Senate
- In office 1912–1914
- Preceded by: John S. Biddison
- Succeeded by: Newton D. R. Allen

Member of the Maryland House of Delegates from the Baltimore County district
- In office 1918–1918 Serving with Howard E. Brazier, Howard Bryant, Frank S. Given, David G. McIntosh Jr., Charles A. Reich
- In office 1904–1910 Serving with William F. Coghlan, J. Howard Fox, Frederick W. Glantz, Harry S. Morfoot, Charles M. Snyder, Michael P. Kehoe, John Mays Little, W. George Marley, James W. Ayres, Albert F. Brunier, John Gephart, Harry E. Goodwin, Sylvester J. Roche, Joshua H. Cockey, George Y. Everhart, Christopher E. Fitzsimmons, John Green, Allen Stevenson

Personal details
- Born: Carville Dickinson Benson; August 24, 1872 Halethorpe, Maryland, U.S.
- Died: February 8, 1929 (aged 56) Baltimore, Maryland, U.S.
- Resting place: Cedar Hill Cemetery; Brooklyn, Maryland, U.S.
- Education: Lehigh University; University of Baltimore
- Occupation: Lawyer; politician

Carville Dickinson Benson (August 24, 1872 – February 8, 1929) was a U.S. Congressman who represented the second Congressional district of Maryland from 1918 to 1921.

== Early life ==
Carville Benson was born near Halethorpe in Baltimore County, Maryland, Benson attended preparatory schools and Lehigh University of Bethlehem, Pennsylvania, in 1890. He graduated from the law department of University of Baltimore in 1893, and was admitted to the bar the same year.

== Career ==
Benson served as a member of the Maryland House of Delegates from 1904 to 1910 and again in 1918, serving as Speaker of the House in 1906. He also served as a member of the Maryland State Senate from 1912 to 1914.

In 1918, Benson was elected as a Democrat to the Sixty-fifth Congress to fill the vacancy caused by the death of Joshua Frederick Cockey Talbott, and was re-elected to the Sixty-sixth Congress, serving from November 5, 1918, to March 3, 1921. He was an unsuccessful candidate for reelection in 1920 to the Sixth-seventh Congress.

After Congress, Benson resumed the practice of law in Baltimore, Maryland, and resided in Halethorpe. He was appointed the State insurance commissioner of Maryland in 1924 and served until his death.

== Personal life ==
Benson died on February 8, 1929, in Baltimore. He is interred in Cedar Hill Cemetery of Brooklyn, Maryland.

Political offices
Preceded by George Y. Everhart	Speaker of the Maryland House of Delegates; 1906	Succeeded by James Enos Ray Jr.
U.S. House of Representatives
Preceded by Joshua Frederick Cockey Talbott	U.S. Congressman from the 2nd district of Maryland; 1918–1921	Succeeded by Albert Blakeney
