= John Sappington (Maryland politician) =

American physician and politician (1847–1905)

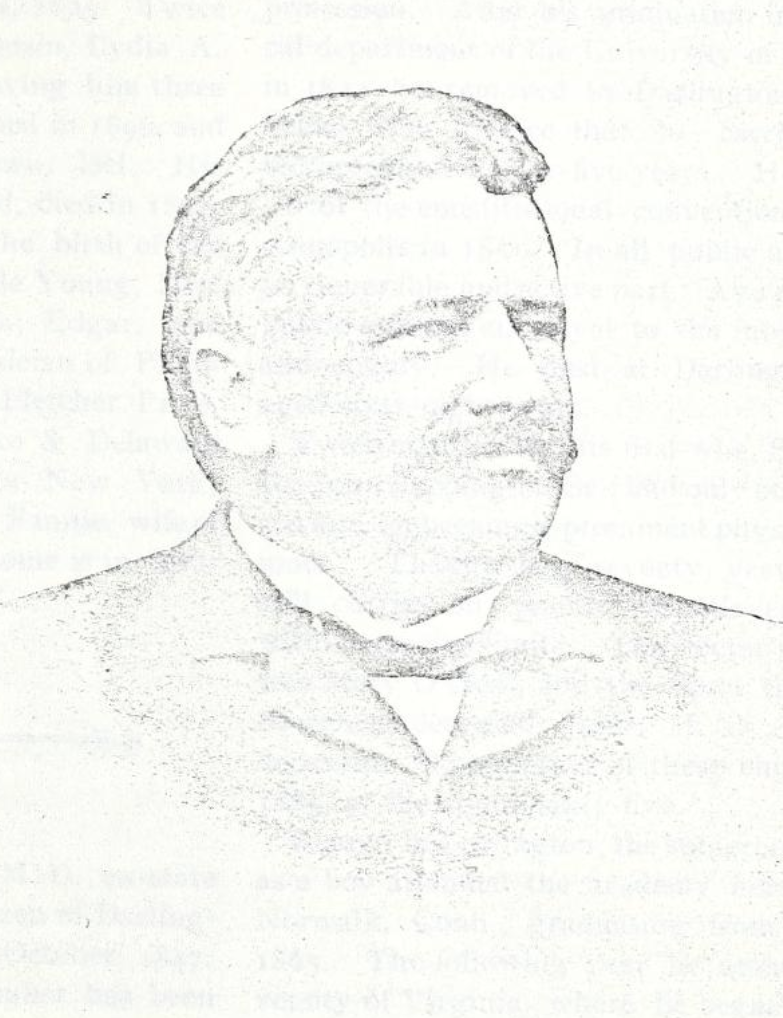
- Sketch of Sappington in 1897 publication

Member of the Maryland Senate
- In office 1886–1888
- Preceded by: Edward M. Allen
- Succeeded by: Benjamin Silver Jr.
- Constituency: Harford County

Personal details
- Born: October 1847 Darlington, Maryland
- Died: February 10, 1905 (aged 57)
- Party: Democratic
- Spouse(s): Mary P. Hays (m. 1874) Rosa Jacobs
- Children: 3
- Education: Jefferson Medical College
- Occupation: Physician; politician

John Sappington (October 1847 – February 10, 1905) was a physician and politician from Maryland. He served in the Maryland Senate from 1886 to 1888.

== Early life ==
John Sappington was born in October 1847 in Darlington, Maryland, to Mary (née O'Neal) and John Sappington. He attended the Elkton Academy and graduated from an academy in Norwalk, Connecticut, in 1865. He attended the University of Virginia and started to study medicine. He graduated from Jefferson Medical College in 1868.

== Career ==
Sappington was a Democrat. He was elected to the Maryland Senate in 1885. He served from 1886 to 1888, representing Harford County.

Sappington worked as a physician and had a medical practice.

== Personal life ==
Sappington married Mary P. Hays in 1874. They had three sons, Walter Hays, William F. and Earl (or Earle) Neilson. He later married Rosa Jacobs of Bel Air. Sappington was a Episcopalian.

Sappington had a stroke in July 1904. He died on February 10, 1905.
