= John S. Biddison =

American politician (1873–1921)

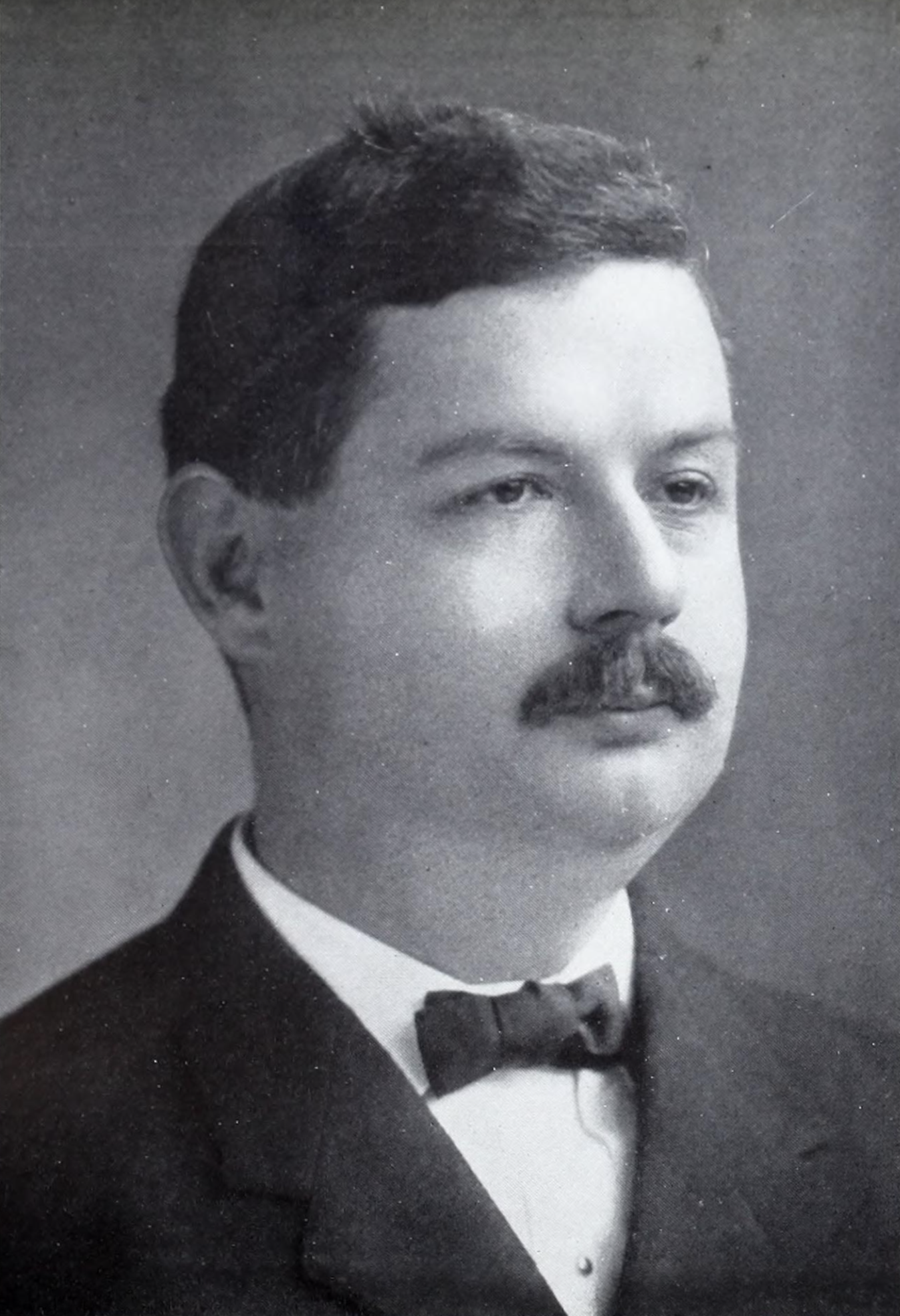
- Biddison in 1914 publication

Member of the Maryland Senate
- In office 1904–1912
- Preceded by: John Hubner
- Succeeded by: Carville D. Benson

Personal details
- Born: February 18, 1873 Gardenville, Maryland, U.S.
- Died: July 9, 1921 (aged 48) Overlea, Maryland, U.S.
- Resting place: Gardenville, Maryland, U.S.
- Party: Democratic
- Spouse: Eva Nichols (m. 1896)
- Children: 5
- Education: Sadler's Business College
- Alma mater: University of Maryland Law School
- Occupation: Politician; lawyer; judge; bank president

John S. Biddison (February 18, 1873 – July 9, 1921) was a politician, lawyer, judge and bank president from Maryland. He served as a member of the Maryland Senate from 1904 to 1912.

== Early life ==
John S. Biddison was born on February 18, 1873, in Gardenville, Maryland, to Julia (née McCawley) and Thomas C. Biddison. He attended public schools in Baltimore County and Sadler's Business College. He graduated from University of Maryland Law School. He was admitted to the bar in Baltimore County in 1894.

== Career ==
Biddison practiced law in Baltimore and in Baltimore County. He opened a law practice with John S. Gontrum. He worked with Gontrum until Goatrum's death in 1909. He then ran the firm Biddison & Gontrum with John B. Gontrum. He was a lawyer during the Friedenwald estate's will case in Towson. He served as counsel of the Baltimore County Commissioners for four years.

Biddison was a Democrat. Biddison served as a member of the Maryland Senate, representing Baltimore County, from 1904 to 1912. He was president pro tempore of the senate in 1910. He served as chairman of the judiciary committee for three terms.

Biddison became a minority judge of the appeals tax court in April 1920, succeeding Charles Kreuder Jr. He was one of the founders and served as president of the Overlea Bank from its founding until his death. Biddison was a member of the board of visitors.

== Personal life ==
Biddison married Eva Nichols in 1896. They had five children, John S. Jr., Thomas N., Lulu, Stella and Eve.

Biddison lived in Raspeburg, Maryland. Biddison died on July 9, 1921, after suffering an attack at Overlea bank and died at the apartment of the cashier in Overlea. He was buried at the family cemetery at his family's home in Gardenville.
