= Eldon Jacob Crull =

American politician

Eldon Jacob Crull (1859 – May 5, 1917) was an American politician. Crull was the chief Republican primary rival to Jeannette Rankin, who became the first woman elected to the U.S. House of Representatives. Crull committed suicide shortly after the election.

== Education and life ==
Crull came from an affluent Midwestern family and was sent to Virginia's Staunton Military Academy for high school. He briefly attended Ohio's Marietta College and the University of Cincinnati. Thereafter, he attended Indiana University Bloomington. For health reasons, he first went to the Arizona Territory, then Colorado, and finally Montana.

He first served as a colonel on Montana Governor Edwin L. Norris's staff. Although Crull was a Republican, Norris was a Democrat. In 1912, Crull was the alternate delegate from Montana to the Republican National Convention held in Chicago, Illinois. Subsequently, he served one term in the Montana legislature as a representative. His political base was Musselshell County with its seat being Roundup, Montana. Crull left the legislature to return to the governor's staff. This time serving under Sam V. Stewart who was a Democrat.

In 1915, Crull was one of two representatives who appeared before the Montana Public Service Commission on behalf of the citizens of Roundup and Klein, Montana, and the committee appointed by Local Union No. 915 of the United Mine Workers of America successfully alleging that the electricity rates charged by the Roundup Coal Mining Company were unreasonable and discriminatory. A fixed rate regimen resulted.

In August 1916, he was Jeannette Rankin's major rival in the Republican primary and was defeated by her. On May 5, 1917, he committed suicide on the steps of an "undertaking establishment" by swallowing "muriatic acid" because, as The New York Times reported, he was "despondent over increasing illness and sorrowing over his defeat "at the primaries last August by Miss Jeannette Rankin, Montana Congresswoman".
