= John D. C. Duncan Jr. =

American politician (1884–1958)

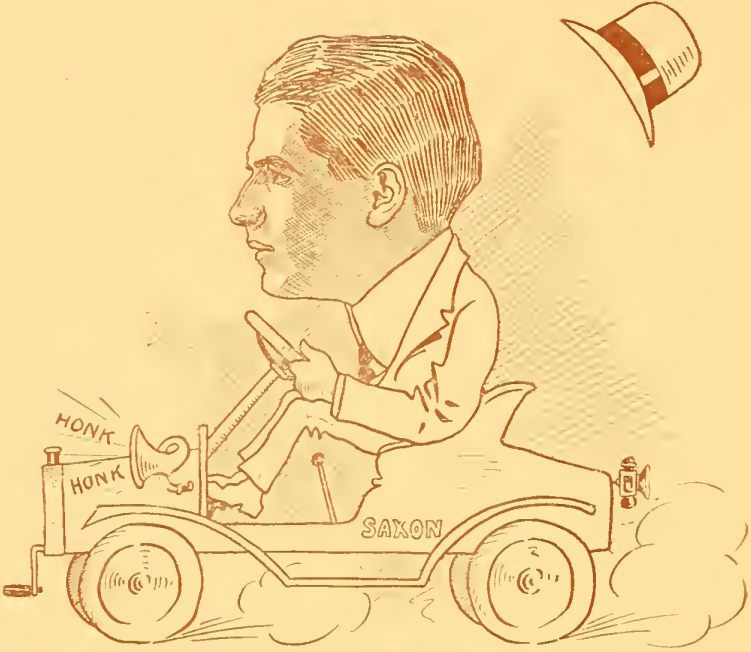
- Caricature of Duncan in 1916 publication

Member of the Maryland Senate from the Baltimore County district
- In office 1935–1937
- Preceded by: David G. McIntosh Jr.
- Succeeded by: James J. Lindsay Jr.

Member of the Maryland House of Delegates from the Baltimore County district
- In office 1920–1920 Serving with Edward H. Burke, Frank S. Given, Louis B. Holknecht, John Hubner Rice, John A. Weilbrenner

Personal details
- Born: September 28, 1884 Baltimore County, Maryland, U.S.
- Died: August 13, 1958 (aged 73) Baltimore, Maryland, U.S.
- Resting place: Prospect Hill Cemetery; Towson, Maryland, U.S.
- Party: Democratic
- Spouse: Marguerite Cox
- Children: 2
- Parent: Frank I. Duncan (father)
- Education: Baltimore City College; Dickinson College; University of Maryland School of Law
- Occupation: Politician; lawyer

John D. C. Duncan Jr. (September 28, 1884 – August 13, 1958) was an American politician from Maryland. He served as a member of the Maryland House of Delegates, representing Baltimore County in 1920. He served as a member of the Maryland Senate from 1935 to 1937.

== Early life ==
John D. C. Duncan Jr. was born on September 28, 1884, in Baltimore County, Maryland, to Frank I. Duncan and his wife. His grandfather was John D. C. Duncan. Duncan studied at Baltimore City College, Dickinson College and the University of Maryland School of Law.

== Career ==
Duncan practiced law and moved his offices to Towson.

Duncan was a Democrat. He served as a member of the Maryland House of Delegates, representing Baltimore County in 1920. He was elected to the Maryland Senate in 1934. Duncan was a member and served as chairman of the State Democratic Central Committee of Baltimore County. He served as a member of the Maryland Senate, representing Baltimore County from 1935 to 1937.

Duncan worked as an assistant county solicitor later in life and was assigned to the board of liquor license commissioners.

== Personal life ==
Duncan married Marguerite Cox of Baltimore County. They had two daughters, Mrs. John E. Raine Jr. and Mrs. Robert W. Price. Duncan lived in Lutherville, Maryland, and was a member of St. Johns Methodist Church.

Duncan died on August 13, 1958, at Johns Hopkins Hospital in Baltimore. He was buried at Prospect Hill Cemetery in Towson.
