= USS J. Fred Talbott =

Wickes-class destroyer

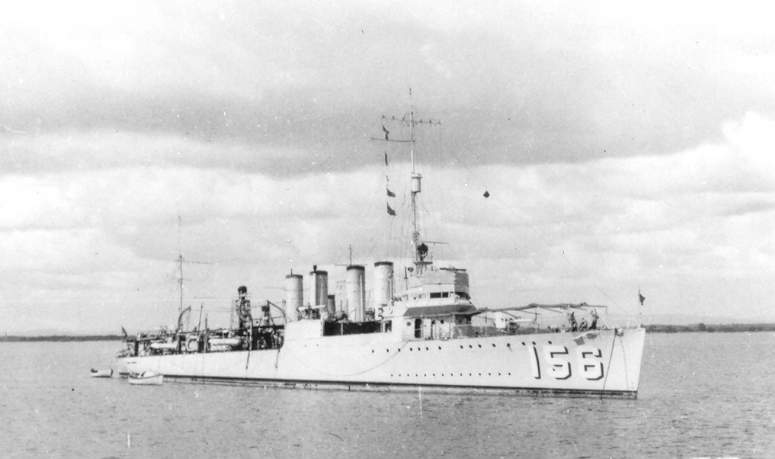
- J. Fred Talbott at anchor

History

United States
- Name: J. Fred Talbott
- Namesake: Joshua Frederick Cockey Talbott
- Builder: William Cramp & Sons, Philadelphia
- Yard number: 471
- Laid down: 8 July 1918
- Launched: 14 December 1918
- Commissioned: 30 June 1919
- Decommissioned: 18 January 1923
- Recommissioned: 1 May 1930
- Reclassified: Miscellaneous auxiliary, AG-81, 25 September 1944
- Decommissioned: 21 May 1946
- Stricken: 19 June 1946
- Fate: Sold for scrapping, 22 December 1946

General characteristics
- Class & type: Wickes-class destroyer
- Displacement: 1,090 tons
- Length: 314 ft 5 in (95.8 m)
- Beam: 30 ft 6 in (9.3 m)
- Draft: 8 ft 8 in (2.6 m)
- Speed: 35 knots (65 km/h)
- Complement: 101 officers and enlisted
- Armament: 4 × 4 in (102 mm)/50 guns; 2 × 3 in (76 mm)/23 guns; 2 × .30 cal. (7.62 mm), 12 x 21 in (533 mm) torpedo tubes

USS J. Fred Talbott (DD-156), named for Joshua Frederick Cockey Talbott (1843–1918), Representative from Maryland Second District from 1879 to 1885, from 1893 to 1895 and again from 1903 to 1918, was a Wickes-class destroyer.

== Construction and commissioning ==
J. Fred Talbott was laid down by the William Cramp & Sons Ship and Engine Building Company at Philadelphia on 8 July 1918, launched on 14 December 1918 by Mrs. Robert L. Bates, niece of Representative Talbott and commissioned on 30 June 1919.

== Service history ==
J. Fred Talbott departed Newport, Rhode Island on 10 July for the Mediterranean Sea, where she acted as a station ship at various ports acting as US representation during reconstruction. Upon her return to the United States on 21 June 1920, the ship took part in Neutrality Patrol duty on the East Coast and engaged in fleet exercises before her decommissioning at Philadelphia on 18 January 1923.

J. Fred Talbott recommissioned 1 May 1930 and immediately began shakedown training in Delaware Bay. For the ten years that followed, the ship operated along the Atlantic coast and in the Caribbean Sea engaging in anti-submarine training; fleet operations; and carrying out the many far-ranging duties of the United States fleet. She also helped to train reserves and midshipmen.

With the outbreak of the war in Europe, and the United States' initial effort to protect its shipping while remaining neutral, J. Fred Talbott was assigned patrol duties in the waters off the Atlantic entrance to the Panama Canal. Following the US entry into the war with the surprise attack on Pearl Harbor, the ship took up convoy escort duties between New Orleans, Cuba, and the Panama Canal.

Following an overhaul in Boston in January 1944, J. Fred Talbott sailed on 13 February with her first transatlantic convoy, and, after her safe return from Casablanca, took up escort duties with convoys from Iceland southward into the Caribbean. Later in the year, after arrival on 15 September, she was converted at New York and reclassified AG-81 on 25 September 1944. The ship arrived Port Everglades, Florida, 1 November to act as a target ship for torpedo bombers, continuing this training service until the war's end.

J. Fred Talbott was decommissioned at Boston on 21 May 1946, stricken from the Naval Vessel Register on 19 June 1946 and sold for scrap to the Boston Metals Corporation of Baltimore, Maryland on 22 December 1946.
