= J. Frederick C. Talbott =

American politician

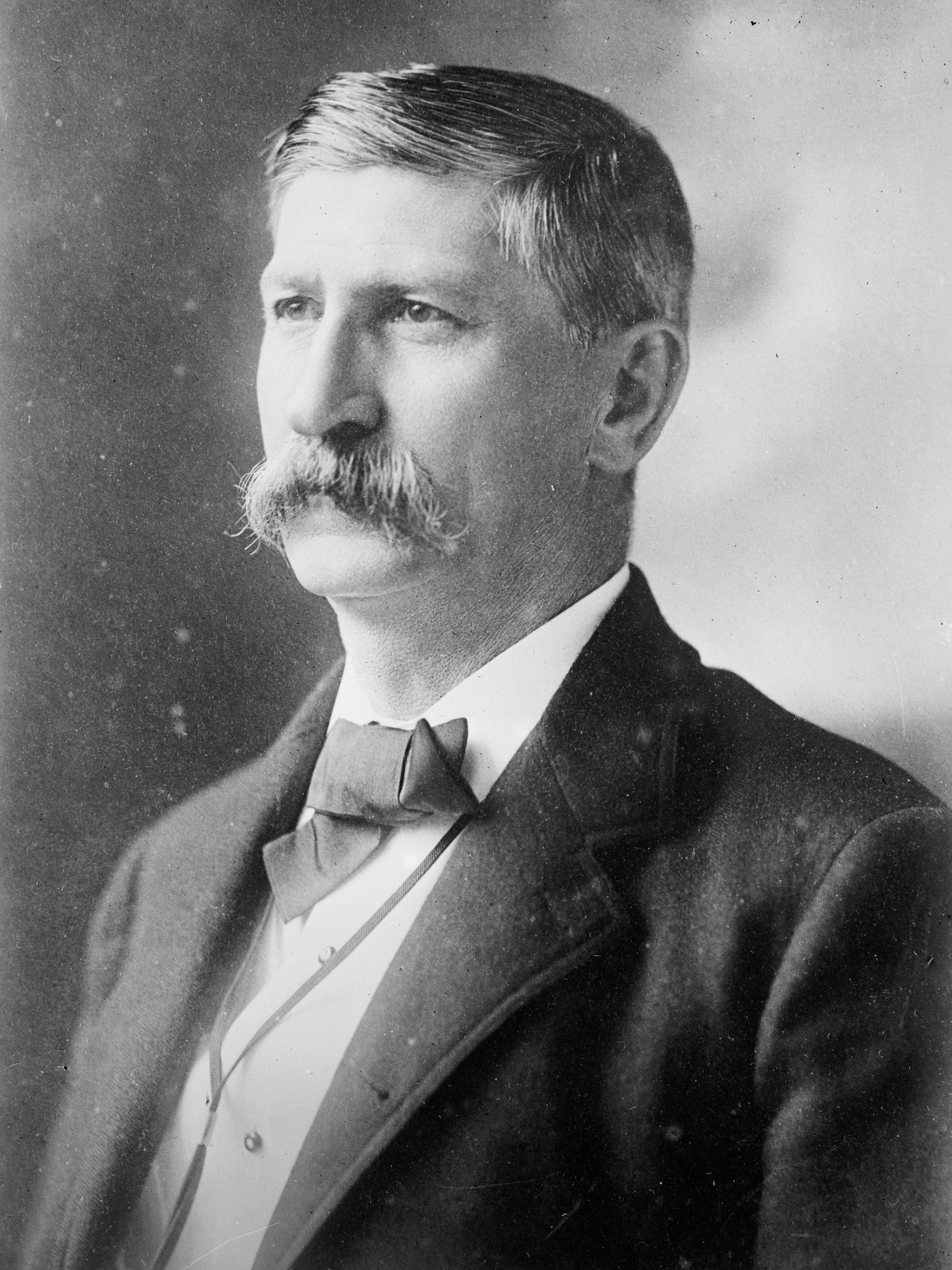

Member of the U.S. House of Representatives from Maryland's 2nd district
- In office March 4, 1879 – March 3, 1885
- Preceded by: Charles B. Roberts
- Succeeded by: Frank T. Shaw
- In office March 4, 1893 – March 3, 1895
- Preceded by: Herman Stump
- Succeeded by: William Benjamin Baker
- In office March 4, 1903 – October 5, 1918
- Preceded by: Albert Blakeney
- Succeeded by: Carville D. Benson

Personal details
- Born: July 29, 1843 Lutherville, Maryland, U.S.
- Died: October 5, 1918 (aged 75) Lutherville, Maryland, U.S.
- Party: Democratic

Joshua Frederick Cockey Talbott (July 29, 1843 – October 5, 1918) was a U.S. congressman who represented the second congressional district of Maryland.

== Biography ==
He was born near Lutherville, Maryland on July 29, 1843. He began to study law in 1862 but joined the Confederate Army during the American Civil War in 1864 to serve in the Second Maryland Cavalry. Following the war, Talbott was admitted to the bar in 1866 and began to practice law in Towson, Maryland.

In 1878, after several years of activity in Democratic politics and local civic affairs, he was elected to the U.S. Congress. Except for the periods 1885 to 1893, during which he served for a time as Insurance Commissioner for Maryland, and 1894 to 1902, he served in Congress until his death. Talbott was a member of the House Naval Affairs Committee for 25 years and worked unceasingly for a strong and modern Navy.

He died in Lutherville on October 5, 1918, and is interred in Sherwood Cemetery of Cockeysville, Maryland.

== Namesake ==
The destroyer USS J. Fred Talbott (DD-156) was named for him.

== See also ==
- List of members of the United States Congress who died in office (1900–1949)

U.S. House of Representatives
Preceded by Charles B. Roberts	U.S. Representative for the 2nd Congressional District of Maryland; 1879–1885	Succeeded by Frank T. Shaw
Preceded by Herman Stump	U.S. Representative for the 2nd Congressional District of Maryland; 1893–1895	Succeeded by William Benjamin Baker
Preceded by Albert Blakeney	U.S. Representative for the 2nd Congressional District of Maryland; 1903–1918	Succeeded by Carville D. Benson
