= Frank I. Duncan =

American politician (1858–1946)

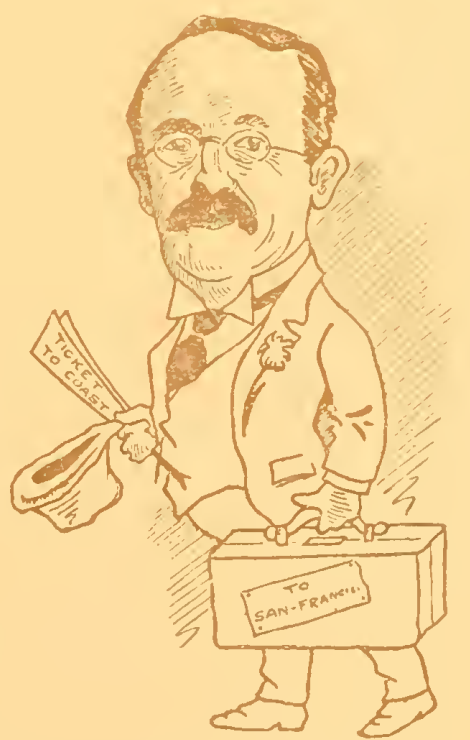
- Caricature of Duncan in 1916 publication

Member of the Maryland House of Delegates from the Harford County district
- In office 1888–1888 Serving with Daniel A. Boone, J. Nelson Daily, George R. Gott, John Hubner, John A. Smith, Charles R. Whiteford

Personal details
- Born: June 4, 1858 Butler, Maryland, U.S.
- Died: May 11, 1946 (aged 87) Baltimore, Maryland, U.S.
- Resting place: Jessop's Cemetery; Cockeysville, Maryland, U.S.
- Party: Democratic
- Spouse: Clara Eaverson (m. 1882)
- Children: 5, including John D. C. Jr.
- Education: University of Maryland School of Law
- Occupation: Politician; lawyer; judge; newspaper publisher; newspaper editor

Frank I. Duncan (June 4, 1858 – May 11, 1946) was an American politician, lawyer, judge and newspaper publisher and editor from Maryland. He served as a member of the Maryland House of Delegates, representing Baltimore County in 1888.

== Early life ==
Frank I. Duncan was born on June 4, 1858, in Butler, Maryland, to Catherine (née Jones) and John D. C. Duncan. He attended public schools in Baltimore County and the Milton Academy. He graduated from the University of Maryland School of Law in 1884. He was admitted to the Baltimore County bar on September 8, 1884, and was admitted to the Maryland bar on October 11, 1901.

== Career ==
Duncan worked at his father's general merchandise store in Butler. He then worked as a traveling salesman for the candy company Darby & Company. In 1885, Duncan purchased the Baltimore County Herald and renamed it the Baltimore County Democrat. He changed it from a Republican paper to a Democratic paper. He served as an editor of the paper for over 20 years.

In 1884, Duncan opened a law office in Towson. Duncan worked as counsel for the Baltimore County board of county commissioners in 1887. Duncan was a Democrat. He was elected in a special election in 1888 to the Maryland House of Delegates. He served as a state delegate, representing Baltimore County in 1888. In 1889, he was appointed state's attorney for Baltimore County. He was then elected in 1890 and served in that role until 1895.

Duncan was appointed as state insurance commissioner by governor Edwin Warfield in 1904. In 1905, he was appointed associate judge of the Third Judicial Circuit Court, representing Baltimore and Harford counties. In 1920, he was re-elected. He served in that role until 1936; serving eight years beyond the mandatory retirement age due to a joint resolution passed in 1927. In 1914, Duncan helped the passage of a law that established the juvenile court in Baltimore County.

After his retirement, Duncan continued his private practice and served as receiver at the Pikesville National Bank and Hampstead National Bank. He served as president of the Maryland State Bar Association in 1938. He served as chair of the board of directors of the Towson National Bank. Duncan served on the board of managers of the Maryland House of Correction. He also served on the board of visitors of the Maryland State School for the Deaf in Frederick. He served on the board of directors of the Hospital for Consumptives of Maryland in Towson (also known as the Eudowood Sanatorium).

== Personal life ==
Duncan married Clara Eaverson of Altoona, Pennsylvania, on February 14, 1882. They had one son and four daughters, John D. C. Jr., Mrs. H. Finley Tucker, Mrs. Ernest C. Hatch, Mrs. William B. Cornell and E. Jeannette. His wife died in 1942. He had a home in Lutherville, Maryland.

Duncan died on May 11, 1946, at the Union Memorial Hospital in Baltimore. He was buried at Jessop's Cemetery in Cockeysville.
