= James Enos Ray Jr. =

American politician (1874–1934)

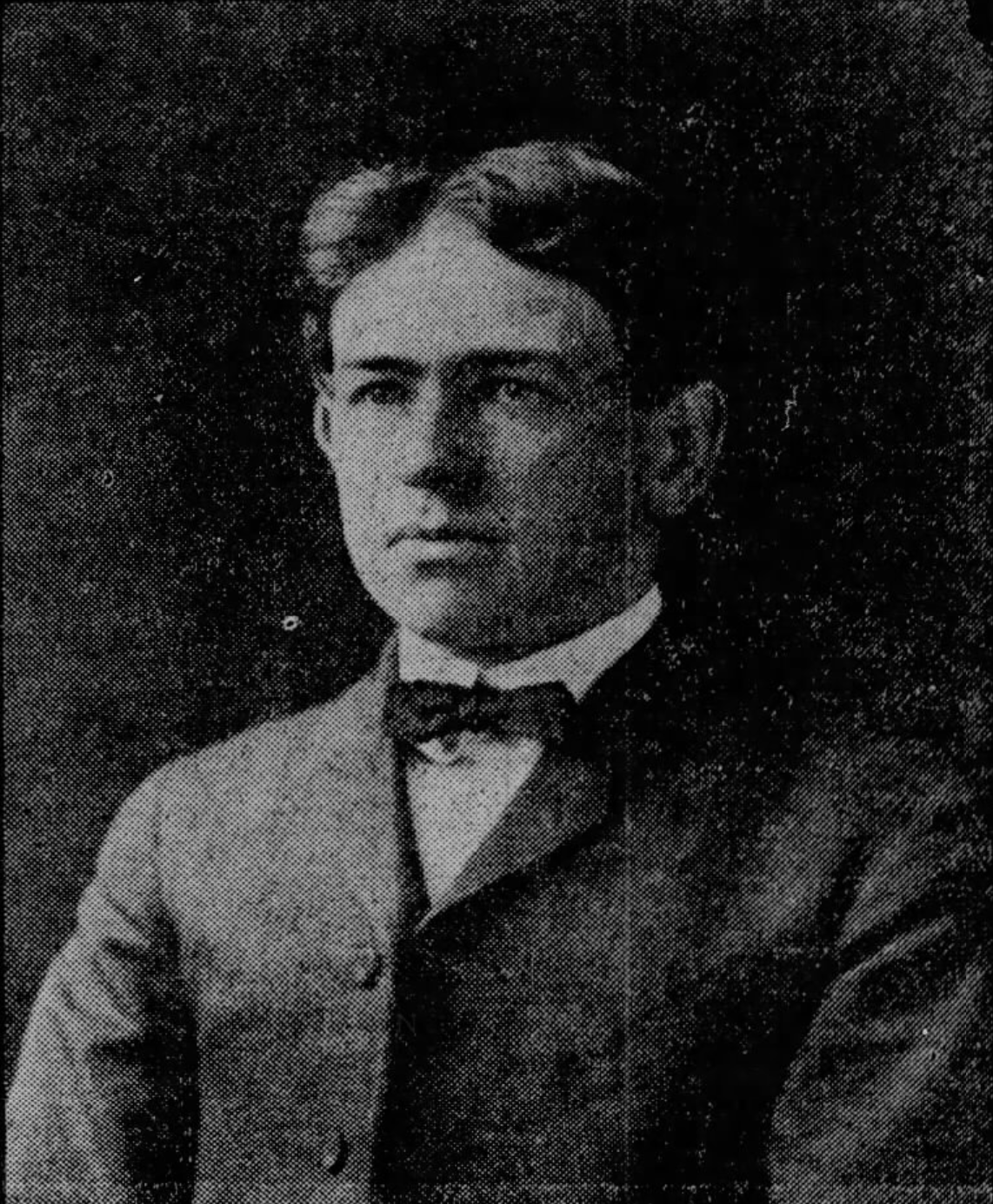
- Ray in 1906 newspaper

Speaker of the Maryland House of Delegates
- In office 1908
- Preceded by: Carville D. Benson
- Succeeded by: Adam Peeples

Member of the Maryland House of Delegates
- In office 1904–1908

Personal details
- Born: January 12, 1874 Chillum, Maryland, U.S.
- Died: September 10, 1934 (aged 60) Chillum, Maryland, U.S.
- Resting place: Rock Creek Cemetery; Washington, D.C., U.S.
- Party: Democratic
- Spouse: Isabel Arthur
- Education: Maryland Agricultural College (BA); Georgetown Law School (LLB, LLM)
- Occupation: Politician; lawyer

James Enoy Ray Jr. (January 12, 1874 – September 10, 1934), better known as J. Enos Ray Jr., was an American politician and lawyer from Maryland. He served as a member of the Maryland House of Delegates from 1904 to 1908.

== Early life ==
James Enoy Ray Jr. was born on January 12, 1874, in Chillum, Prince George's County, Maryland, to Gertrude (née Shreve) and James Enos Ray. He attended public schools in Chillum. He graduated from the Maryland Agricultural College (later the University of Maryland) in 1892 with a Bachelor of Arts. He graduated from Georgetown Law School with a Bachelor of Laws and Master of Laws. He was admitted to the bar on April 8, 1897.

== Career ==
Ray was a Democrat. Ray served as a member of the Maryland House of Delegates, representing Prince George's County, from 1904 to 1908. He served as the speaker pro tempore in 1906 and speaker of the house in 1908. He served as a presidential elector in 1909. He lost the 1909 bid for Maryland Senate and the 1910 election for U.S. Congress. He was appointed state auditor in 1912. He served from 1913 to 1918.

Ray worked as a lawyer. He worked for the law firm Ray & Keefer. He also served as president of Prince George's Bank and Trust Company and director of Lincoln National Bank. He served as chair of the state tax commission, starting in 1924. He was collector of internal revenue at Baltimore. He was a member of the Democratic State Central Committee. He was serving as chairman of the Democratic State Central Committee from 1923 to his death. He was elected as president of the University of Maryland Alumni Association in June 1933.

== Personal life ==
Ray married Isabel Arthur. Ray died on September 10, 1934, in Chillum. He was buried at Rock Creek Cemetery in Washington, D.C.

Political offices
Preceded by Carville D. Benson	Speaker of the Maryland House of Delegates; 1908	Succeeded by Adam Peeples
