= Edward H. Burke =

American politician and lawyer (1886–1955)

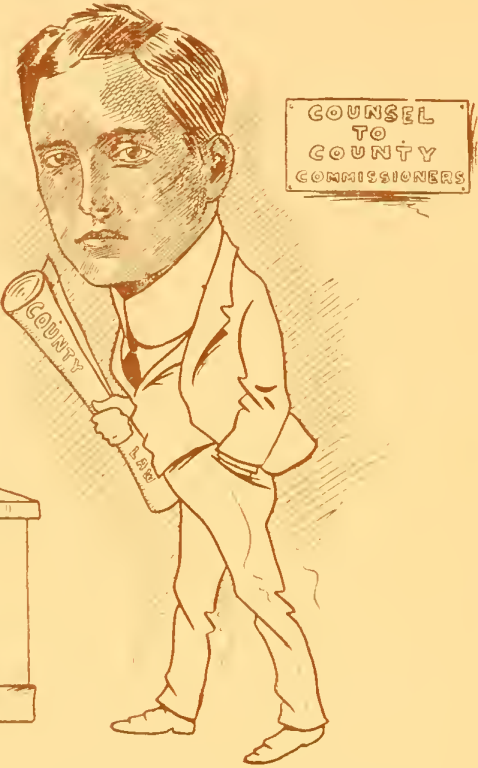
- Caricature of Burke in 1916 publication

Member of the Maryland House of Delegates from the Harford County district
- In office 1920–1920 Serving with John D. C. Duncan, Frank S. Given, Louis B. Holknecht, John Hubner Rice, John A. Weilbrenner

Personal details
- Born: Edward Hamilton Burke; January 14, 1886 Baltimore County, Maryland, U.S.
- Died: July 10, 1955 (aged 69) Baltimore, Maryland, U.S.
- Resting place: Cathedral Cemetery; Baltimore, Maryland, U.S.
- Party: Democratic
- Spouse: Elizabeth Carter (m. 1913)
- Education: Loyola College (BA); University of Maryland School of Law
- Occupation: Politician; lawyer

Edward Hamilton Burke (January 14, 1886 – July 10, 1955) was an American politician and lawyer from Maryland. He served as a member of the Maryland House of Delegates, representing Baltimore County in 1920.

== Early life ==
Edward Hamilton Burke was born on January 14, 1886, in Baltimore County, Maryland to Colie (née Ady) and N. Charles Burke. His father was a judge. He attended Loyola High School and graduated from Loyola College with a Bachelor of Arts in 1906. He graduated from the University of Maryland School of Law in 1908. He was admitted to the bar on August 5, 1908.

== Career ==
Burke had a private law practice. He was a private in the United States Marine Corps during World War I. After the war, Burke was appointed assistant United States attorney.

Burke was a Democrat. Burke served as a member of the Maryland House of Delegates, representing Baltimore County in 1920. He was chairman of the standing committee on judiciary. He was a member of the standing committees on printing, education and agriculture.

In 1923, Burke joined the law firm Bowie & Clerk. The firm was renamed Bowie & Burke and later named Bowie, Burke & Leonard.

In 1933, he was chairman of the New Democratic Organization. He was a member of the commission to revise the land and inheritance laws of Maryland in 1939. He was chairman of the committee to review the judicial system of Maryland from 1952 to 1953. He was chairman of the Baltimore County Charter Board from 1954 to 1955.

Burke served as president of the Maryland State Bar Association from 1953 to 1954. He was also exalted ruler of the Order of Elks. Burke served four years as president of the Hibernian Society of Baltimore; retiring in 1940.

== Personal life ==
Burke married Elizabeth Carter in 1913. He lived in Reistertown, Maryland.

Burke died on July 10, 1955, at Union Memorial Hospital in Baltimore. He was buried in Cathedral Cemetery in Baltimore.

== Legacy ==
Burke received an honorary Doctor of Laws from Loyola College in 1947.
