= Newton D. R. Allen =

American politician (died 1927)

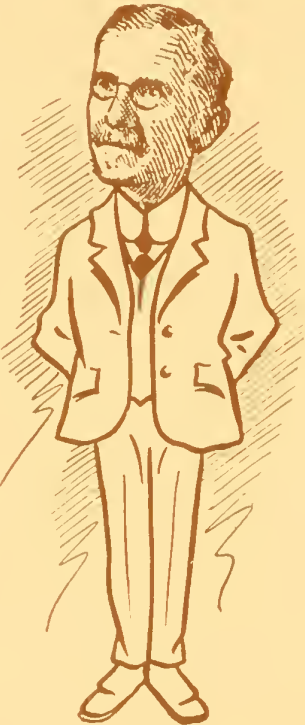
- Caricature of Allen in 1916 publication

Member of the Maryland Senate from the Baltimore County district
- In office 1916–1918
- Preceded by: Carville Benson
- Succeeded by: David G. McIntosh Jr.

Personal details
- Born: c. 1858 York County, Pennsylvania, U.S.
- Died: February 3, 1927 (aged 69) Towson, Maryland, U.S.
- Resting place: Prospect Hill Cemetery; Towson, Maryland, U.S.
- Party: Republican
- Spouse: Rosa Ellen Heathcote
- Children: 5
- Education: University of Maryland School of Law
- Occupation: Politician; educator; lawyer

Newton D. R. Allen (c. 1858 – February 3, 1927) was an American politician from Maryland. He served as a member of the Maryland Senate, representing Baltimore County from 1916 to 1918.

== Early life and education ==
Newton D. R. Allen was born in York County, Pennsylvania. He was educated in the state of New York. He later studied law and graduated from the University of Maryland School of Law in 1903. He was admitted to the bar in 1903.

== Career ==
In 1890, Allen became a professor of mathematics at Staunton Military Academy in Virginia. In 1895, Allen moved to Baltimore County and became a teacher at county schools. In 1899, Allen was elected as county surveyor.

Allen worked for the Internal Revenue Service and then started practicing law in 1912.

Allen was a Republican. He served as a member of the Maryland Senate, representing Baltimore County from 1916 to 1918.

== Personal life ==
Allen married Rosa Ellen Heathcote. They had five children, Herschel H., Wendell D., Edward Russell, Mrs. R. M. Wegner and Sarah Ruth (married Joseph Colvine Ocker). His son Wendell D. was a lawyer, assistant attorney general and served as president of the Maryland state school board.

Allen died on February 3, 1927, at the age of 69, at his home on West Joppa Road in Towson, Maryland. He was buried at Prospect Hill Cemetery in Towson.
