= Albert Blakeney =

American politician (1850–1924)

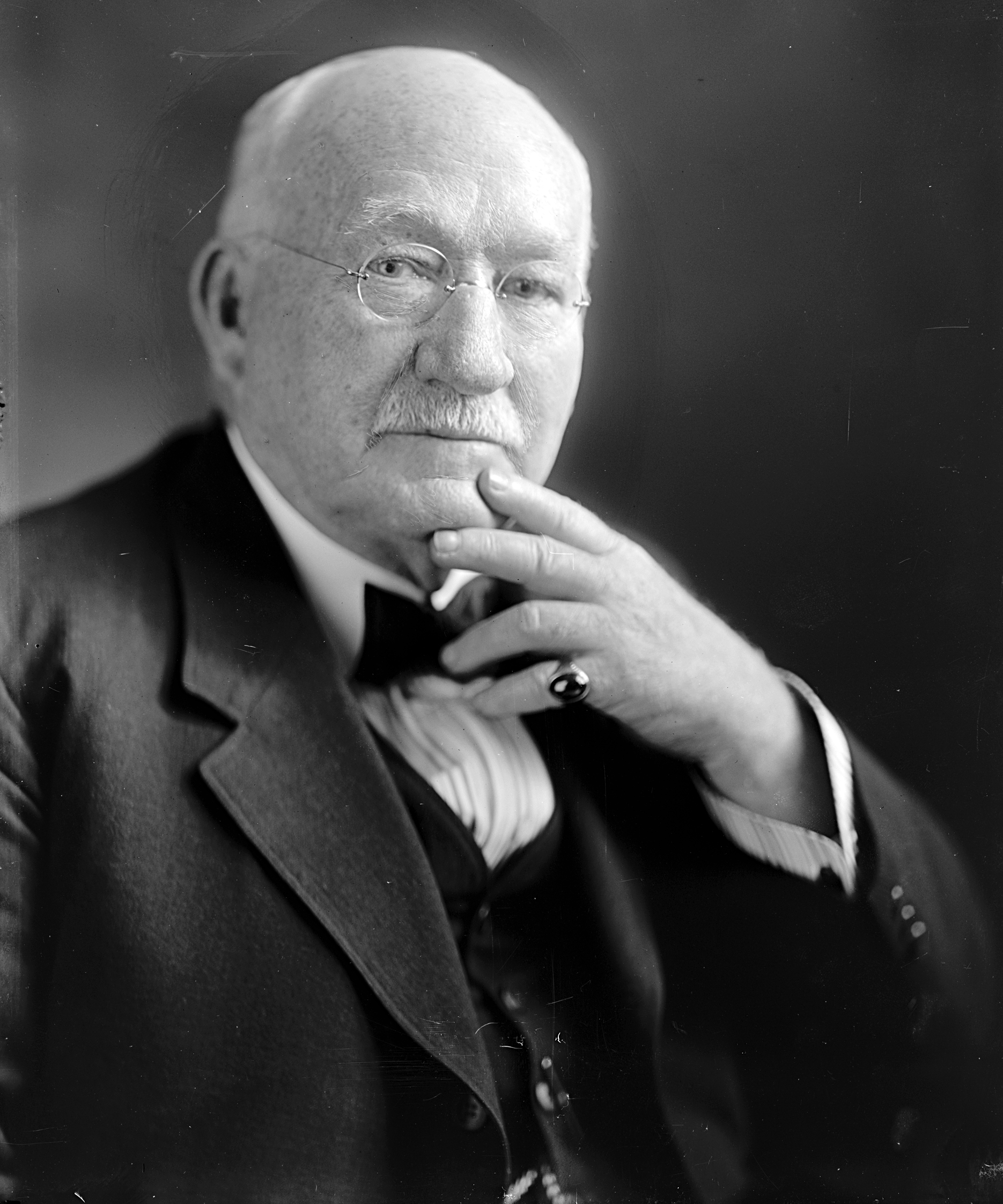

Member of the U.S. House of Representatives from Maryland's 2nd district
- In office March 4, 1901 – March 3, 1903
- Preceded by: William Benjamin Baker
- Succeeded by: J. Frederick C. Talbott
- In office March 4, 1921 – March 3, 1923
- Preceded by: Carville D. Benson
- Succeeded by: Millard Tydings

Personal details
- Born: September 28, 1850 Riderwood, Maryland, U.S.
- Died: October 15, 1924 (aged 74) Baltimore, Maryland, U.S.
- Resting place: Baltimore Cemetery
- Party: Republican

Albert Alexander Blakeney (September 28, 1850 – October 15, 1924) was a U.S. Congressman who represented the second Congressional district of Maryland from 1901 to 1903 and from 1921 to 1923.

Blakeney was born in Riderwood, Maryland. He learned the business of cotton manufacturing and established the large cotton-duck mills located in Franklinville, Maryland. Blakeney served as commissioner of Baltimore County, Maryland, from 1895 to 1899.

In 1900, Blakeney was elected as a Republican to Congress, serving one full term from March 4, 1901, to March 3, 1903. He declined to be a candidate for renomination in 1902. He resumed his former business activities in Franklinville, and was again elected to Congress in 1920, serving another term from March 4, 1921, to March 3, 1923. He was an unsuccessful candidate for re-election in 1922, and died in Baltimore, Maryland, two years later. He is interred in the Baltimore Cemetery.
