= Howard Bryant (politician) =

American politician (1861–1930)

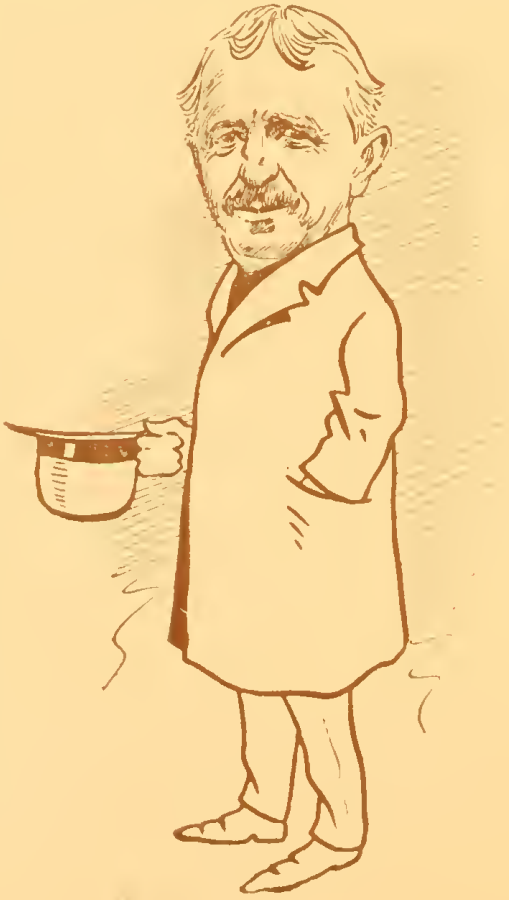
- Caricature of Bryant in 1916 publication

Member of the Maryland House of Delegates from the Baltimore County district
- In office 1916–1918 Serving with Carville Benson, Howard E. Brazier, Frank S. Given, David G. McIntosh Jr., Charles A. Reich, John A. Weilbrenner

Personal details
- Born: July 21, 1861 Centreville, Maryland, U.S.
- Died: September 18, 1930 (aged 69) Baltimore, Maryland, U.S.
- Resting place: Druid Ridge Cemetery; Baltimore, Maryland, U.S.
- Party: Democratic
- Spouse: Lillian Edmonds
- Children: 2
- Education: West Nottingham Academy
- Alma mater: Princeton University
- Occupation: Politician; lawyer; educator

Howard Bryant (July 21, 1861 – September 18, 1930) was an American politician, lawyer and educator from Maryland. He served as a member of the Maryland House of Delegates, representing Baltimore County, from 1916 to 1918. He served as speaker pro tempore in 1916. Bryant served as president of the Baltimore City Council from 1923 to his death in 1930. Bryant taught at the Baltimore University School of Law (later the University of Maryland Francis King Carey School of Law) from 1890 to 1929.

== Early life ==
Howard Bryant was born on July 21, 1861, in Centreville, Maryland, to Joshua W. Bryant. His father was state's attorney and a lawyer in Caroline County. Bryant graduated from West Nottingham Academy in Cecil County in 1878. He graduated from Princeton University in 1882. After graduating, Bryant read law in his father's office until 1884.

== Career ==
In 1884, Bryant moved to Baltimore and joined the office of Bradley Tyler Johnson. He then moved to Hagerstown for his health and associated with Henry H. Keedy. In 1887, Bryant moved back to Baltimore and became a member of the law firm J. W. & H. Bryant.

Bryant was a Democrat. In 1897, Bryant was selected as one of the members of the Democratic mayoralty steering committee. In 1898, he moved to Arlington, Baltimore. Bryant served as a member of the Maryland House of Delegates, representing Baltimore County, from 1916 to 1918. He served as speaker pro tempore in 1916. In the 1916 session, Bryant introduced a moving picture censor bill. In the 1918 session, Bryant introduced a game license bill and a bill prescribing the educational prerequisites for lawyers.

In 1890, Bryant helped organize the Baltimore University School of Law. It would later join with the University of Maryland Francis King Carey School of Law around 1925. He would teach there until 1929.

Bryant served as president of the Baltimore City Council, second branch from 1919 to 1923 and as president of the Baltimore City Council from 1923 to his death in 1930.

== Personal life ==
Bryant married Lillian Edmonds. They had two sons, Charles Harris and Allen M.

Bryant owned a home on Chauncey Road in Guilford, Baltimore. Bryant owned a summer home in Ocean City, Maryland. Bryant was friends with governor Albert Ritchie and Woodrow Wilson.

Bryant died on September 18, 1930, at Union Memorial Hospital in Baltimore. He was buried at Druid Ridge Cemetery in Baltimore.
