= Edward C. Peter II =

U.S. Army lieutenant general

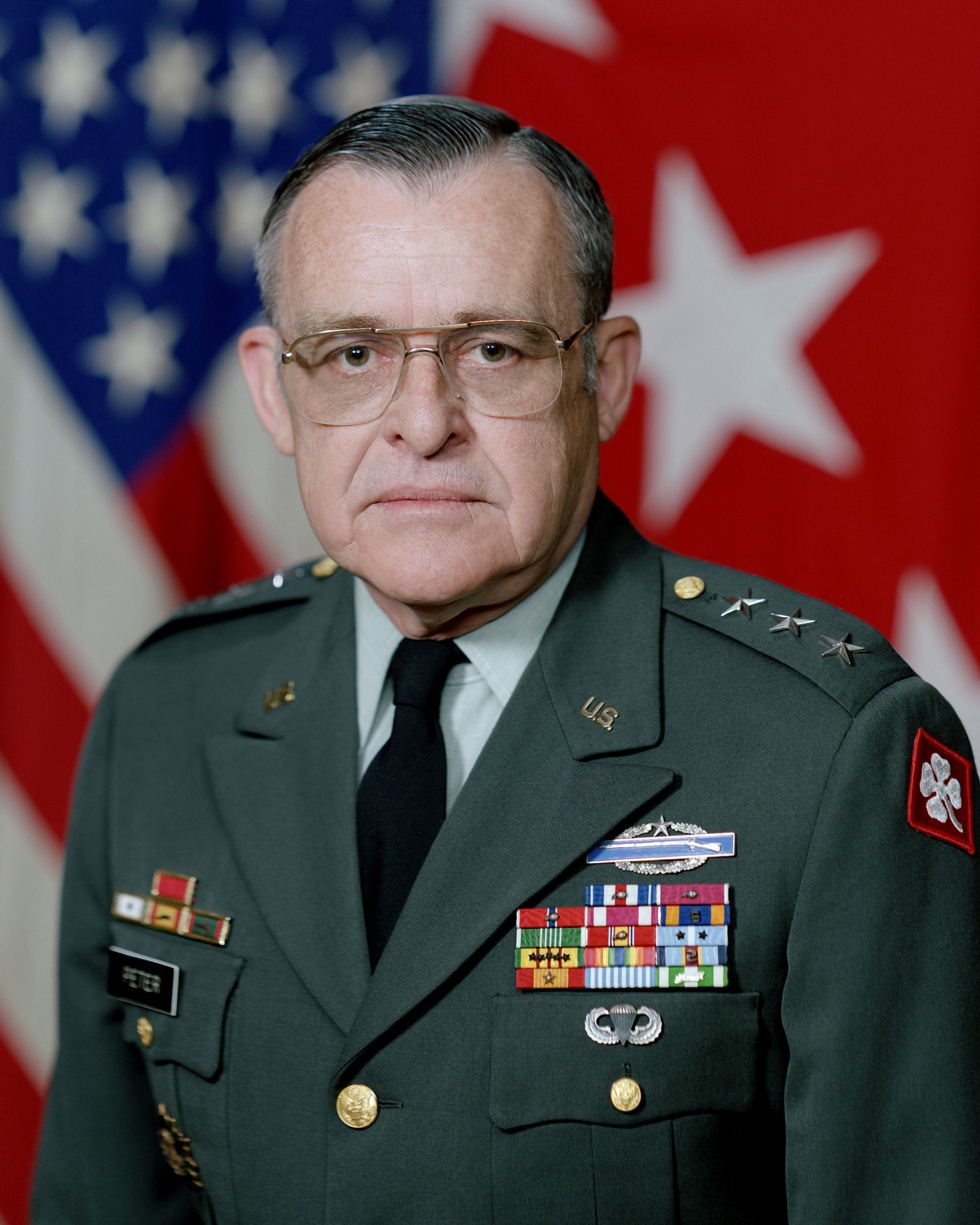
- Peter as commander of Fourth U.S. Army, circa 1984
- Born: May 8, 1929; Washington, D.C., U.S.
- Died: November 12, 2008 (aged 79); Savannah, Georgia, U.S.
- Burial place: Arlington National Cemetery
- Education: Staunton Military Academy; United States Military Academy; University of Michigan
- Spouse: Jean (Foresteire) Peter (m. 1953–2008, his death)
- Children: 4
- Military career
- Service: United States Army
- Service years: 1951–1986
- Rank: Lieutenant General
- Service number: 063917
- Unit: U.S. Army Infantry Branch
- Commands: Company F, 188th Airborne Infantry Regiment; Company D, 2nd Battle Group, 21st Infantry Regiment; 2nd Battalion, 27th Infantry; 1st Infantry Division Support Command; Department of the Army Legislative Liaison Office; 5th Infantry Division and Fort Polk; Fourth United States Army.
- Wars: Korean War; Vietnam War
- Awards: Army Distinguished Service Medal; Silver Star; Legion of Merit; Bronze Star Medal; Meritorious Service Medal; Air Medal; Army Commendation Medal
- Other work: President, Commercial Distribution Center, Inc.

Edward C. Peter II (May 8, 1929 – November 12, 2008) was a career officer in the United States Army. A veteran of the Korean War and Vietnam War, he attained the rank of lieutenant general and was most notable for his command of 2nd Battalion, 27th Infantry, the 1st Infantry Division Support Command, the Department of the Army Legislative Liaison Office, the 5th Infantry Division and Fort Polk, and Fourth United States Army. Peter received the Combat Infantryman Badge twice, and his awards and decorations included the Army Distinguished Service Medal (2), Silver Star (2), Legion of Merit (2), Bronze Star Medal (2), Meritorious Service Medal, Air Medal (6), and Army Commendation Medal.

== Early life ==
Edward Compston Peter II was born in Washington, D.C., on May 8, 1929, a son of Edward Peter and Anita Phillips (Smith) Peter. He was raised in Montgomery County, Maryland, and Miami, Florida, and attended Staunton Military Academy (SMA). While at SMA, he was a member of the Howie Rifles, a nationally known drill and ceremony team, for three years, and commanded it during his senior year. He was also a member of the varsity swimming team for three years, and was co-captain in his senior year. Peter attained the rank of first captain and student regimental commander during his senior year. At graduation, Peter received a medal to recognize his high standing in advanced military science and the Kable Legion of Honor, an award named for the school's founder, which was presented to the graduate most conspicuous for leadership, good conduct, and academic excellence.

In 1947 Peter began attendance at the United States Military Academy (West Point). At West Point, he served as commander of Company I-2 with the rank of cadet captain. In 1951 he graduated and received his commission as a second lieutenant of Infantry.

== Start of career ==
After completing his initial training, in 1952 and 1953 he served during the Korean War as a platoon leader, company executive officer, assistant battalion operations officer (S-3), and battalion intelligence officer (S-2) in the 35th Infantry Regiment. He received promotion to first lieutenant in 1952. In 1955, he received a Master of Science degree in Mechanical Engineering from the University of Michigan. He was promoted to captain in 1957, and later commanded Company F, 188th Airborne Infantry Regiment at Fort Campbell, Kentucky.

Peter later served as assistant professor of Thermodynamics on the West Point faculty, and in 1959 was assigned to Hawaii as commander of Company D, 2nd Battle Group, 21st Infantry Regiment. After completing his command tour, he served as aide-de-camp to the 25th Infantry Division commander, followed by a posting as administrative assistant to the operations officer (J-03) of United States Pacific Command. He subsequently served as a unit advisor to the United States Army Reserve's 100th Battle Group, 442nd Infantry Regiment. He was promoted to major in 1961.

== Continued career ==
After leaving Hawaii, Peter was a student at the United States Army Command and General Staff College, from which he graduated in 1963. After graduation, he was assigned to the U.S. Senate Liaison Branch in the Department of the Army's Office of the Chief of Legislative Liaison. In 1965, he was promoted to lieutenant colonel. In 1966, Peter began attendance at the Armed Forces Staff College (AFSC), and he graduated in 1967.

After completing AFSC, Peter was assigned to Vietnam War duty as commander of 2nd Battalion, 27th Infantry Regiment, a unit of the 25th Infantry Division. After his command tour, Peter remained in Vietnam as a member of the staff at II Field Force, Vietnam. After returning to the United States, Peter completed the course at the Industrial College of the Armed Forces in 1969, then was assigned to the staff at Supreme Headquarters Allied Powers Europe in Belgium. In 1972, he returned to the United States and was assigned to command the 1st Infantry Division Support Command as a colonel, and was stationed at Fort Riley, Kansas.

== Later career ==
From 1973 to 1976, Peter served on the staff of the United States Army Forces Command at Fort McPherson, Georgia, first as Secretary of the General Staff and later as Assistant Deputy Chief of Staff for Operations (G-3). In 1976, Peter returned to Hawaii as a brigadier general with assignment as assistant division commander of the 25th Infantry Division. From 1978 to 1981 he was Chief of Legislative Liaison for the Department of the Army.

From 1981 to 1983, Peter commanded the 5th Infantry Division (Mechanized) and Fort Polk as a major general. He served as the army's Assistant Deputy Chief of Staff for Personnel (G-1) from 1983 to 1984. Peter commanded Fourth U.S. Army as a lieutenant general from 1984 to 1986. He retired in June 1986.

== Retirement and death ==
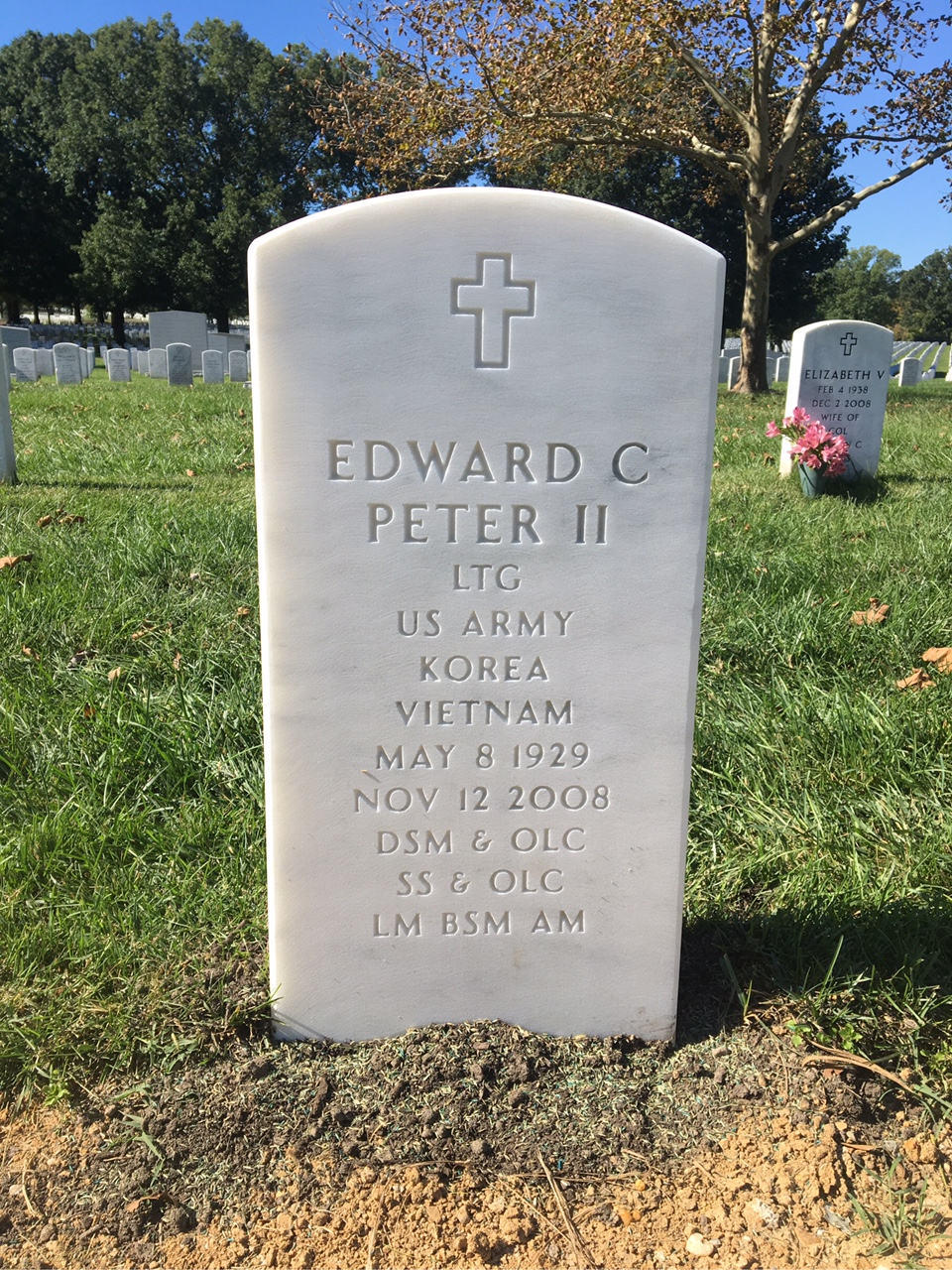
Peter's grave marker at Arlington National Cemetery

In 1987, Peter was hired as vice president of administration for Commercial Distribution Center, Inc. in Independence, Missouri. He later became the president of the company, and served until retiring in 1994. In retirement, Peter was a resident of Savannah, Georgia. He died in Savannah on November 12, 2008. Peter was buried at Arlington National Cemetery.

In 1953, Peter married Jean Foresteire (1929–2017). They were the parents of four children: Jean, Edward C. III, Mary, and Anita.

== Awards ==
Peter was a two-time recipient of the Combat Infantryman Badge. He also received the Army Distinguished Service Medal with oak leaf cluster, Silver Star with oak leaf cluster, Legion of Merit with oak leaf cluster, Bronze Star Medal with oak leaf cluster, Meritorious Service Medal, Air Medal with numeral 6, and Army Commendation Medal.

The Staunton Military Academy Alumni Association inducted Peter into the academy's Hall of Fame.
