= Druid Ridge Cemetery =

Cemetery in Pikesville, Maryland

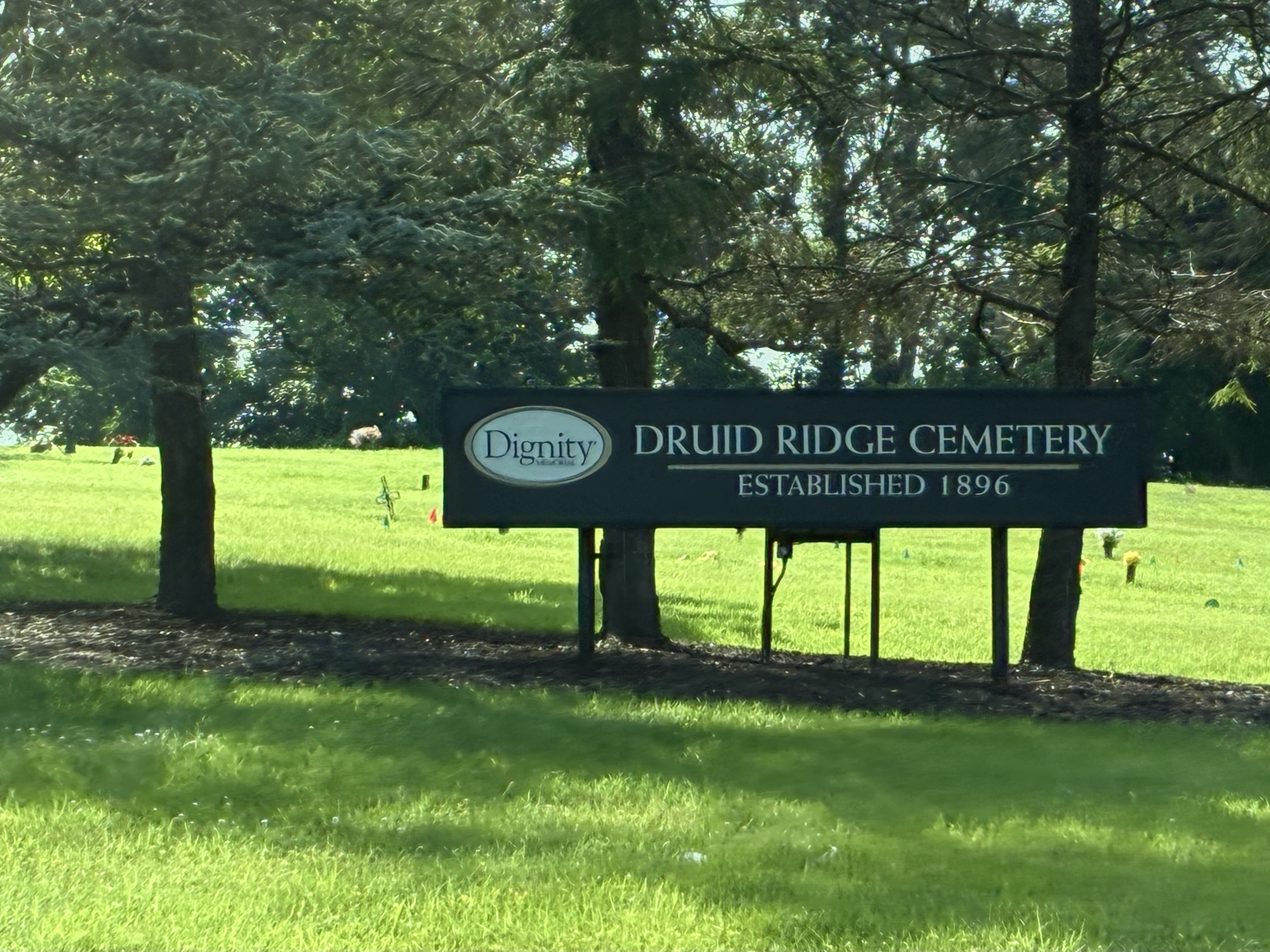
- Entrance to the cemetery
- Interactive map of Druid Ridge Cemetery

Details
- Established: 1896; 130 years ago
- Location: Pikesville, Maryland
- Country: United States
- Coordinates: 39°22′54.85″N 76°43′15.65″W
- Owned by: Dignity Memorial
- Size: 200 acres (81 ha)
- No. of interments: over 18,000
- Website: https://www.dignitymemorial.com/funeral-homes/baltimore-md/druid-ridge-cemetery/9711
- Find a Grave: Druid Ridge Cemetery

Druid Ridge Cemetery is a cemetery in Pikesville, Maryland, just outside the city of Baltimore. It was established in 1896, but dedicated two years later.

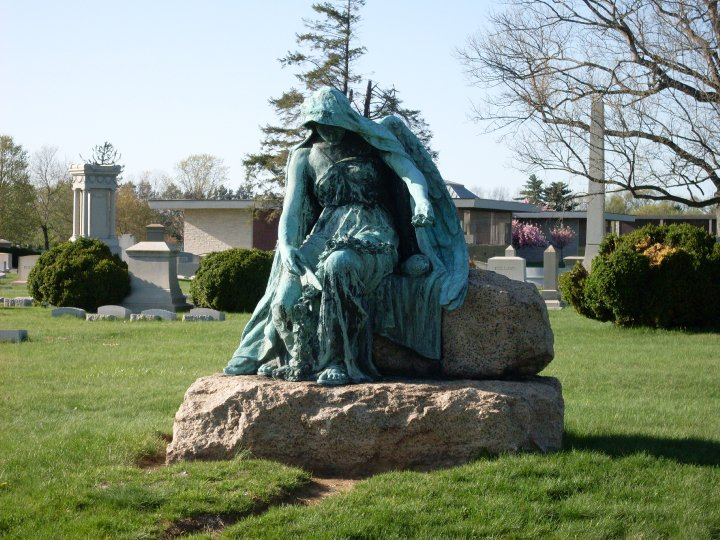
Statue of the Greek fate Clotho.

Among its monuments and graves are several noted sculptures by Hans Schuler and the final resting places of:

- Felix Agnus, American Civil War general and newspaper publisher
- Frederick Bauernschmidt (1864–1933), brewer and philanthropist
- Alfred Blalock, pioneering cardiovascular surgeon
- Patricia Breslin, actress
- Howard Bryant (1861–1930), Maryland state delegate and law professor
- Dorothy Benjamin Caruso, widow of tenor Enrico Caruso
- William Bullock Clark (1860–1917), American geologist
- William Jones "Boileryard" Clarke, baseball player and coach
- Claribel Cone, physician and art collector
- Etta Cone, famous art collector along with her sister who together helped establish the Baltimore Museum of Art
- Walter Dandy, one of the fathers of neurosurgery
- Samuel K. Dennis Jr. (1874–1953), Maryland politician and judge
- Anthony Hastings George, British Consul-General.
- Jennis Roy Galloway, Baltimore-born World War II Commander, later Managing Director of Union Carbide India, Ltd
- Elisabeth Gilman, daughter of Daniel Coit Gilman and prominent Maryland socialist and civil liberties advocate
- John F. Goucher, namesake of Goucher College
- Charles Guth, president of Loft Candy Company and Pepsi-Cola
- Virginia Hall, Baltimore-born World War II spy for the British Special Operations Executive
- Eli Jones Henkle, U.S. Congressman, 5th District of Maryland
- Ella Virginia Houck Holloway (1862–1940), President National of the U.S. Daughters of 1812
- William Henry Howell (1860–1945), American physiologist
- Red Kellett, professional baseball player and football executive
- John Charles Linthicum, U.S. Congressman, 4th District of Maryland
- John Mays Little (died 1950), Maryland state delegate
- Adolf Meyer (1866–1950), Swiss-American psychiatrist
- Art Modell, owner of professional football teams
- Keith Molesworth, professional baseball and football player and coach
- Curt Motton, professional baseball player
- William Painter, mechanical engineer best known for his invention of the bottle cap
- Rosa Ponselle, celebrated soprano
- Thomas Rowe Price, Jr. (1898-1983), investment banker and founder of T. Rowe Price
- Carl Vernon Sheridan, World War II Medal of Honor recipient
- George A. Solter (1873–1950), American judge and lawyer
- Richard H. Thompson (1903–1985), philatelist
- Hugh H. Young, pioneering urologist
