= Edward M. Allen =

American politician and businessman (died 1907)

Member of the Maryland Senate
- In office 1882–1884
- Preceded by: Herman Stump
- Succeeded by: John Sappington
- Constituency: Harford County

Personal details
- Born: Bel Air, Maryland, U.S.
- Died: July 19, 1907 (aged 78) Darlington, Maryland, U.S.
- Resting place: Darlington Cemetery; Darlington, Maryland, U.S.
- Party: Republican
- Spouse: Sallie E. Wilson (died)
- Relations: William H. Allen (uncle)
- Occupation: Politician; businessman; lawyer

Edward M. Allen (died July 19, 1907) was a politician, businessman and lawyer from Maryland. He was a member of Maryland Senate from 1882 to 1884.

== Early life ==
Edward M. Allen was born in Bel Air, Maryland, to Adeline (née Miller) and Richard N. Allen. His father was a lawyer and physician. His uncle was William H. Allen, territorial governor of Florida. He grew up on the "Indian Spring" farm of his aunt Peggy Stump and attended Darlington Academy. He then took charge of his aunt's estate. Allen studied law under Judge John H. Price. In 1890, Allen was admitted to the bar in Bel Air.

== Career ==
In 1870, Allen purchased Stafford Mills at the mouth of Deer Creek. He converted the land from flour mills into a bone mill. He also worked in the business of grain and hay. In 1882, there was a large flood which forced Allen to liquidate his property.

Allen was a Republican. In 1881, Allen was elected to the Maryland Senate, representing Harford County. He served from 1882 to 1884.

Allen practiced law in Bel Air. He retired around 1905.

== Personal life ==
Allen married Sallie E. Wilson, the half sister of Judge Price. They had four children who survived childhood, Edward M. Jr., J. M. Grehme, Mrs. Thomas A. Hays and Sallie Ann. His wife died around 1897. He was a member of the Episcopal Church.

Allen died on July 19, 1907, at the age of 78, at his home in Darlington, Maryland. He was buried in Darlington Cemetery.
