= George Hawkins Williams =

American politician (1818–1889)

President of the Maryland Senate
- In office 1882–1884
- Preceded by: Herman Stump
- Succeeded by: Henry Lloyd

Member of the Maryland Senate
- In office 1880–1884

Member of the Maryland House of Delegates from the Baltimore County district
- In office 1878–1878 Serving with Andrew Banks, J. Wolff Burton, Malcolm H. Johnston, Wilson Townsend, John I. Yellott

Personal details
- Born: 1818 Baltimore, Maryland, U.S.
- Died: March 7, 1889 (aged 70–71) Baltimore, Maryland, U.S.
- Party: Democratic
- Spouse: Eleanor Addison Gittings (m. 1843; died 1881)
- Children: 9
- Education: Harvard Law School
- Occupation: Politician; lawyer

George Hawkins Williams (1818 – March 7, 1889) was an American politician and lawyer. He served in the Maryland House of Delegates in 1878, Maryland Senate from 1880 to 1884, and as President of the Maryland Senate in 1882.

== Early life ==
George Hawkins Williams was born in 1818, in Baltimore, Maryland to Elizabeth Bordley (née Hawkins) and George Williams. He graduated from Harvard Law School in 1839. He studied law under William Schley and was admitted to the bar in Maryland in 1843.

== Career ==
Williams worked as a lawyer. He was a Democrat. In 1878, Williams was elected to the Maryland House of Delegates, representing Baltimore County. Williams served in the Maryland Senate, representing Baltimore County from 1880 to 1884. He was elected as President of the Maryland Senate in 1882.

== Personal life ==
Williams was married in 1843 to Eleanor Addison Gittings (1824–1881), daughter of wealthy Baltimore banker John Sterett Gittings (1798-1879). They had nine children:

- Charlotte Carter Ritchie, married Dr. Walter Prescott Smith
- Eleanor Addison, married Dr. Thomas Chatard
- Elizabeth Hawkins, married Dr. Robert Brown Morrison (or Morison)
- Ernault H.
- George May
- John Sterett Gittings
- Rebecca Nichols, married Dr. William Travers Howard
- Sydney B.
- Williams Smith Gittings, married Julia Bell Deford

Williams brother was the historian Elihu Riley. Williams died on March 7, 1889, at his home in Baltimore.

Political offices
Preceded by Herman Stump	President of the Maryland State Senate; 1882	Succeeded by Henry Lloyd
