= David Gregg McIntosh =

Confederate Army officer (1836–1916)

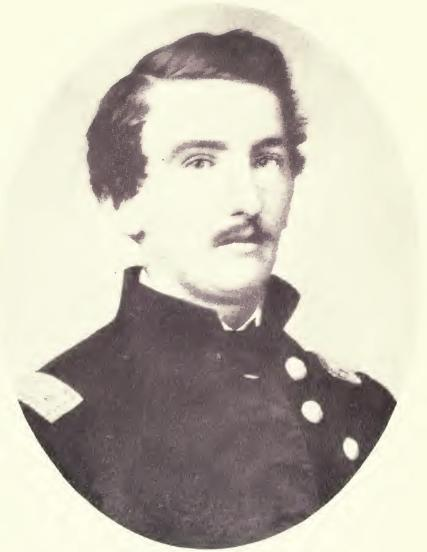
- David Gregg McIntosh
- Born: March 16, 1836; Society Hill, South Carolina, U.S.
- Died: October 16, 1916 (aged 80); Towson, Maryland, U.S.
- Burial place: Hollywood Cemetery; Richmond, Virginia, U.S.
- Spouse: Virginia Pegram
- Children: David G. McIntosh Jr.
- Military career
- Allegiance: Confederate States of America
- Branch: Confederate States Army
- Service years: 1861–1865 (CSA)
- Rank: Lieutenant Colonel (CSA)
- Conflicts: American Civil War

David Gregg McIntosh (March 16, 1836 – October 16, 1916) was a Confederate artillery officer during the American Civil War from the state of South Carolina.

== Early life ==
David McIntosh was born on March 16, 1836, in Society Hill, South Carolina. He attended St. David's Academy and graduated in 1855 from South Carolina College at Columbia. After graduation McIntosh studied law and was admitted to the bar in 1858. He practiced law and was a member of the local militia.

== Career ==
=== Military career ===
After South Carolina seceded on December 20, 1860 and war broke out, McIntosh offered his services to the state. On July 29, 1861 he was appointed captain of Company D, 1st South Carolina Infantry, seeing action at the Battle of Vienna. His company was converted to the Pee Dee Light Artillery in 1862 and he saw action on the Peninsula Campaign, the Battle of Harpers Ferry, the Battle of Antietam, and the Battle of Fredericksburg.

On March 2, 1863, McIntosh was promoted to major and given command of an artillery battalion. He commanded his battalion at the Battle of Chancellorsville, and at the Gettysburg, Bristoe Station, and the Mine Run battles. McIntosh was promoted to lieutenant-colonel in February 1864 and commanded his battalion in the Overland Campaign, including the Battle of the Wilderness. He fought along the siege lines at the Siege of Petersburg and was slightly wounded at the Battle of the Crater. Shortly thereafter he was wounded at the Battle of Weldon Railroad.

McIntosh was present with the battalion at the Battle of Appomattox Court House, April 9, 1865, a Confederate defeat. Knowing that the Confederate States' Army of Northern Virginia was about to surrender to Union Gen. Ulysses S. Grant, McIntosh and several companions slipped through Union lines to join CSA Gen. Joseph E. Johnston's debilitated Army of Tennessee in North Carolina to continue the struggle. However, as that hard-pressed army was prepared to surrender to USA Gen. William T. Sherman, McIntosh then proceeded to join Confederate States President Jefferson Davis, to aid his flight from encroaching Union forces with the remnants of the Confederate government and records. McIntosh left to join CSA forces in the Trans-Mississippi Department, commanded by Lt. Gen. Simon Bolivar Buckner and later General Edmund Kirby Smith. However, President Davis was captured at Irwinville, Ga., on May 10, 1865, and with the final surrender of all CSA armies in the field the war came to a close.

=== Law career and later life ===
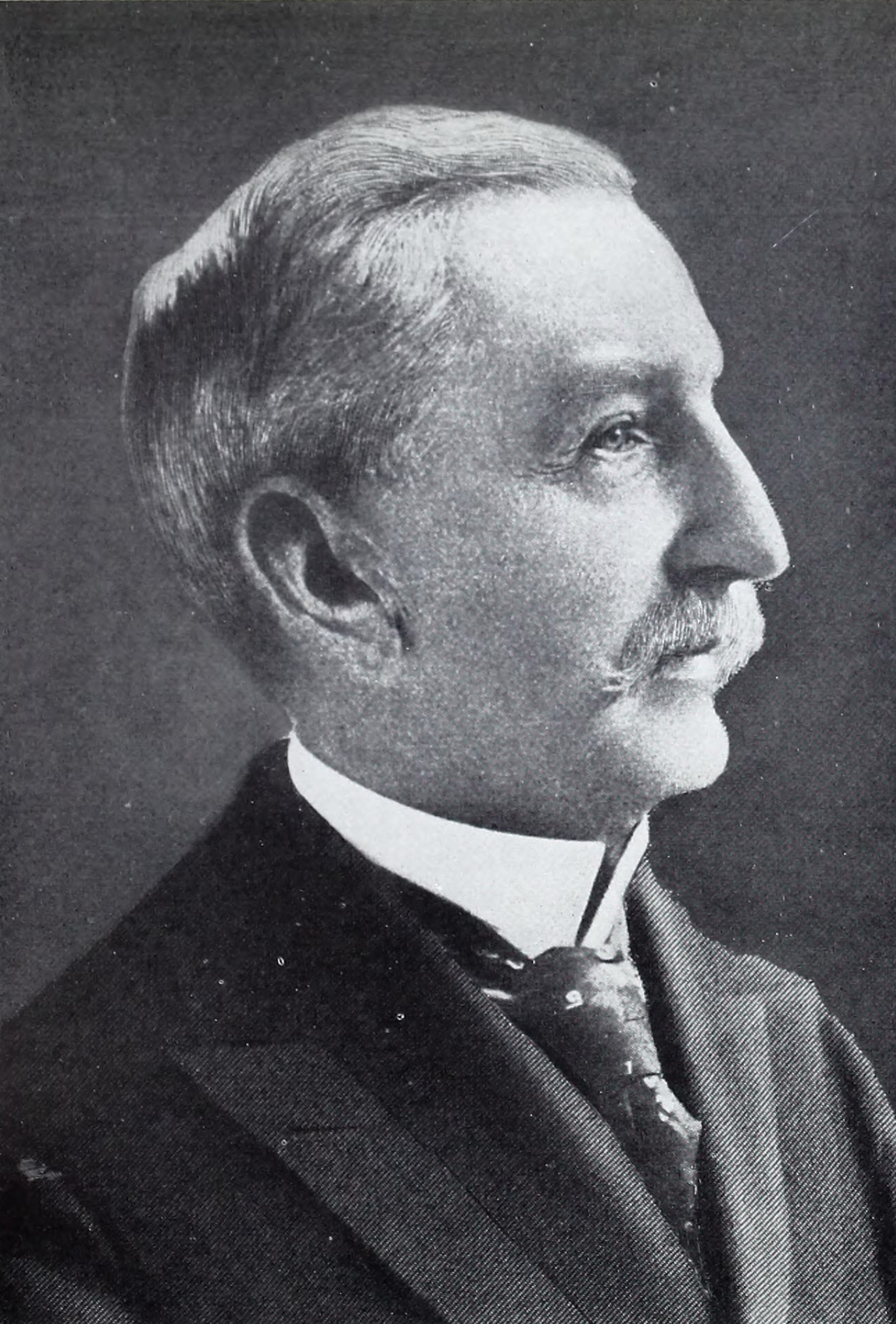
McIntosh in 1914 publication

McIntosh moved to Towson, Maryland, and formed a law partnership with Arthur W. Machen and Richard S. Gittings in 1868. He was elected state's attorney of Baltimore County in 1876. McIntosh was elected as president of the Maryland state bar association in 1909. His notable post-war accomplishments include authoring a pamphlet on the battle of Chancellorsville.

McIntosh lived into the 20th century, dying in Towson in 1916. He is buried in Richmond, Virginia, in Hollywood Cemetery.

== Personal life ==
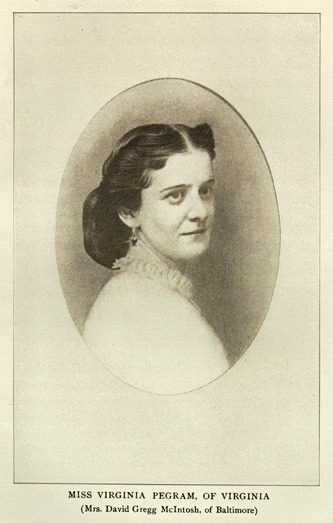
Mrs. David Gregg McIntosh

McIntosh was married to Virginia Pegram and was a brother-in-law to Confederate General John Pegram and his younger brother William J. Pegram. William Pegram was also a famous "gunner" in the Third Corps of the Army of Northern Virginia on a par with McIntosh.

His son, David G. McIntosh Jr. (1877-1940) was a member of the Maryland House of Delegates, 1914-1918 and Maryland Senate, 1920-1933.
