= George A. Solter =

American judge and lawyer (1873–1950)

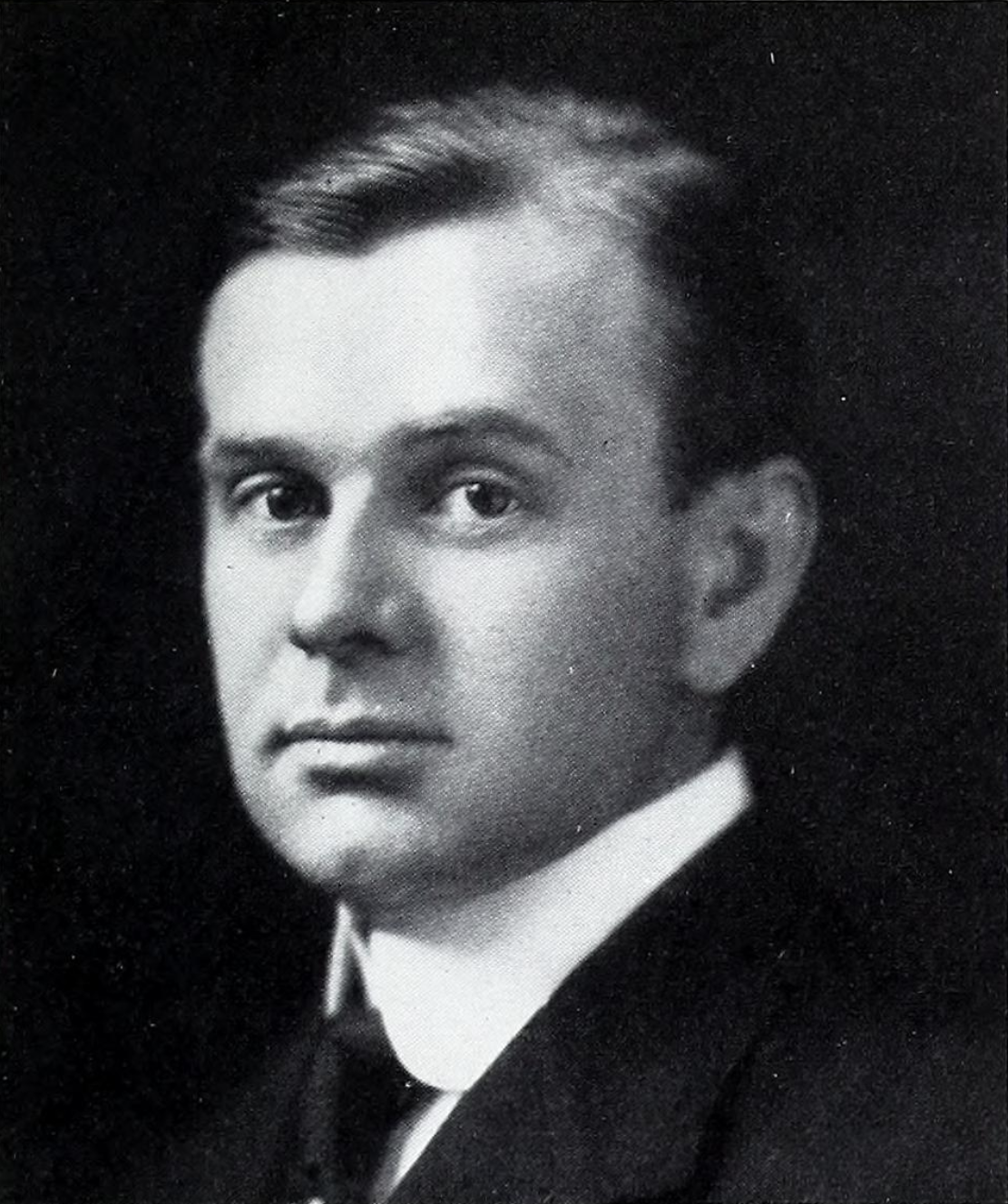
- Solter in 1914 publication

Personal details
- Born: May 14, 1873; Baltimore, Maryland, U.S.
- Died: November 27, 1950 (aged 77); Baltimore, Maryland, U.S.
- Resting place: Druid Ridge Cemetery; Baltimore, Maryland, U.S.
- Spouse(s): Florence Walther (m. 1909; died 1909) Christie Y. Dulaney (m. 1916)
- Children: 2
- Education: Baltimore City College; Sadler's Business College
- Alma mater: University of Maryland Law School (LLB)
- Occupation: Judge; lawyer; educator

George A. Solter (May 14, 1873 – November 27, 1950) was a judge and lawyer from Maryland. He served in the Supreme Bench of Baltimore City from 1924 to 1943.

== Early life ==
George A. Solter was born on May 14, 1873, in Baltimore, Maryland, to Mary Catherine (née Taylor) and John Solter. He attended elementary public schools, Baltimore City College and Sadler's Business College. Solter graduated from the University of Maryland Law School in 1896 with a Bachelor of Laws. He was admitted to the bar on June 2, 1896.

== Career ==
Solter practiced law in partnership with William Bansemer in 1896. He was also associated with John F. Williams. He was assistant state's attorney from 1903 to 1905. He resigned in 1905 to resume his law practice. Solter was a member of Baltimore City School Board from 1907 to 1911. Mayor James H. Preston removed three members of the school board and Solter quit in protest. While on the school board, Solter promoted a resolution to establish junior high schools. Solter served on the Baltimore Board of Police Commissioners from 1910 to 1914.

Solter was appointed by Governor Albert Ritchie to the Supreme Bench of Baltimore City (later renamed the Circuit Court for Baltimore City) in April 1924, replacing Judge Carroll T. Bond. He was elected to a full term in 1926 for a fifteen-year term. He was re-appointed by Governor Herbert O'Conor in 1941 to continue until the following election. He was re-elected in 1942. He retired at the mandatory age of 70 in 1943.

Solter also worked as a lecturer at the University of Baltimore. He was a member of the board of trustees of Goucher College for 30 years and a board member of the Builders Exchange.

== Personal life ==
Solter married Florence Walther in 1909 and she died in 1909. Solter married Christie Y. Dulaney in 1916. They had two children, George Dulaney Solter and Mrs. Robert C. Stephenson. His son, George D. Solter, would be appointed to the Baltimore City Supreme Bench, like his father, but would only serve two years.

Solter died on November 27, 1950, at his home at 3937 Canterbury Road in Baltimore. He was buried at Druid Ridge Cemetery in Baltimore.
