= David G. McIntosh Jr. =

American politician (1877–1940)

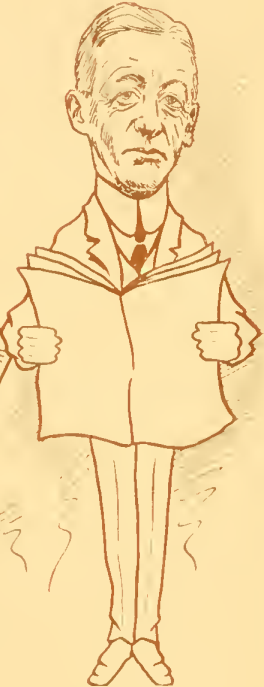
- Caricature of McIntosh in 1916 publication

Member of the Maryland Senate from the Baltimore County district
- In office 1920–1933
- Preceded by: Newton D. R. Allen
- Succeeded by: John D. C. Duncan Jr.

Member of the Maryland House of Delegates from the Baltimore County district
- In office 1914–1918 Serving with Carville Benson, Howard E. Brazier, Howard Bryant, Frank S. Given, Charles A. Reich, John A. Weilbrenner, Charles B. Bosley, B. Wesley Gatch, Henry A. Nagle, Andrew F. Schlee, Newton S. Watts

Personal details
- Born: David Gregg McIntosh Jr. July 1, 1877 Towson, Maryland, U.S.
- Died: May 9, 1940 (aged 62) Towson, Maryland, U.S.
- Resting place: St. Thomas' Church; Garrison Forest, Maryland, U.S.
- Party: Democratic
- Spouse: Charlotte Lowe Rieman (m. 1905)
- Children: 3
- Parent: David Gregg McIntosh (father)
- Education: Johns Hopkins University (BA); University of Maryland School of Law
- Occupation: Politician; lawyer

David Gregg McIntosh Jr. (July 1, 1877 – May 9, 1940) was an American politician from Maryland. He served as a member of the Maryland House of Delegates, representing Baltimore County, from 1914 to 1918. He served as speaker of the house in 1917. McIntosh served as a member of the Maryland Senate, representing Baltimore County, from 1920 to 1933. He served as President of the Maryland Senate from 1924 to 1930.

== Early life ==
David Gregg McIntosh Jr. was born on July 1, 1877, to Virginia J. Pegram and David Gregg McIntosh, in Towson, Maryland. His father was a lawyer who practiced in Towson after moving from Darlington, South Carolina, after the Civil War. McIntosh attended schools in Towson and the Major's Hall School in Baltimore. He graduated from Marston's School for Boys in 1895. He graduated from the Johns Hopkins University with a Bachelor of Arts in 1898. He graduated from the University of Maryland School of Law. He was admitted to the bar in 1900.

== Career ==
McIntosh worked as a law clerk after leaving Johns Hopkins. McIntosh worked as a lawyer from 1900 to 1940. He practiced law with his father in Towson. He formed the law firm McIntosh and Thrift with James F. Thrift in 1906.

McIntosh was a Democrat. McIntosh served as a member of the Maryland House of Delegates, representing Baltimore County, from 1914 to 1918. He was speaker of the house during the 1917 special session. He served as a member of the Maryland Senate, representing Baltimore County, from 1920 to 1933. He served as President of the Maryland Senate from 1924 to 1930.

McIntosh ran unsuccessfully for the Democratic nomination for Maryland governor in 1929–1930, against incumbent Albert C. Ritchie. He ran citing his disapproval of Ritchie running for a fourth term. His campaign lasted from November 1, 1929, to April 4, 1930, when he withdrew his name. McIntosh was president of the Baltimore County Bar Association in 1928.

== Personal life ==
McIntosh married Charlotte Lowe Rieman on February 15, 1905. They had two sons and a daughter, J. Rieman, David G. III and Mrs. Charles T. Williams Jr. He was vestryman of the Trinity Protestant Episcopal Church in Towson for 40 years.

McIntosh died on May 9, 1940, at his home Dumbarton House on York Road in Towson. He was buried at St. Thomas' Church in Garrison Forest, Maryland.
