= Herman Stump =

American politician (1837–1917)

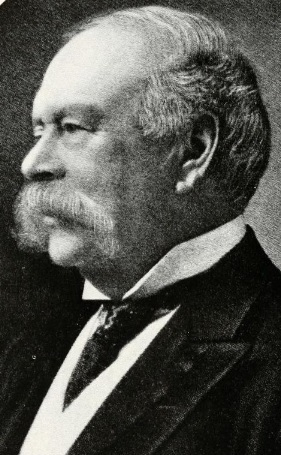

Commissioner General of Immigration
- In office April 8, 1893 – June 30, 1897 (Note: Superintendent of Immigration from April 8, 1893 – March 1, 1895.)
- President: Grover Cleveland; William McKinley
- Preceded by: William D. Owen
- Succeeded by: Terence V. Powderly

Member of the U.S. House of Representatives from Maryland's 2nd district
- In office March 4, 1889 – March 3, 1893
- Preceded by: Frank Shaw
- Succeeded by: Joshua Talbott

President of the Maryland Senate
- In office 1880
- Preceded by: Edward Lloyd
- Succeeded by: George Williams

Member of the Maryland Senate
- In office 1878–1880
- Preceded by: John Walsh
- Succeeded by: Edward Allen
- Constituency: Harford County

Personal details
- Born: August 8, 1837 Oakington Farm, Maryland, U.S.
- Died: January 9, 1917 (aged 79) Bel Air, Maryland, U.S.
- Party: Democratic
- Spouse: Mary Fernandez de Velasco (m. 1903)
- Relatives: Henry W. Archer (cousin)
- Education: University of Delaware (attended)

Herman Stump Jr. (August 8, 1837 – January 9, 1917) was an American politician and lawyer. He is most notable for his service in the Maryland Senate and as a member of the United States House of Representatives.

== Early life ==
Herman Stump Jr. was born on Oakington Farm in Harford County, Maryland, the son of Sarah (née Biays) and John Wilson Stump. His cousin was judge Frederick Stump. He was educated by private tutors and attended Delaware College. Stump attended Delaware College and studied law with his cousin Henry W. Archer, was admitted to the bar on November 11, 1856, and commenced practice in Bel Air.

== Career ==
He became a noted trial attorney, and was notable for his representation of several female defendants in murder cases, including the murder cases of William Scott Ketchum and Nicholas McComas. He also became active in the Maryland Militia, and attained the rank of colonel. Stump purchased a Bel Air plantation called "Waverly", where he farmed and raised livestock.

=== Political career ===
Stump was elected to the Maryland State Senate in 1878 and served until 1880. He served as chairman of the state Democratic convention in 1879, and was the Senate's President pro tempore in 1880. He was defeated in the 1881 state senate election by Edward M. Allen.

In 1888, Stump was elected to the U.S. House of Representatives. He served in the 51st and 52nd Congresses (March 4, 1889 - March 3, 1893). He was not a candidate for re-nomination in 1892.

After the completion of his last term in Congress, Stump was appointed U.S. Superintendent of Immigration by President Grover Cleveland and served from April 8, 1893, to July 16, 1897.

=== Later life ===
Stump practiced law in Bel Air until retiring in 1902, after which he continued to reside at Waverly.

== Personal life ==
In 1903, Stump married Mary Fernandez de Velasco (1853-1944) of New York City. They had no children. He was a member of the Episcopal Church.

Stump died at Waverly on January 9, 1917, and was interred in St. Mary's Cemetery in Emmorton, Maryland.

== Sources ==
=== Books ===
- Spencer, Richard Henry (1919). Genealogical and Memorial Encyclopedia of the State of Maryland. Vol. 2. New York, NY: American Historical Society, Inc.
- Spencer, Richard Henry (1878). The Biographical Cyclopedia of Representative Men of Maryland and District of Columbia. National Biographical Publishing Company.
- Spencer, Thomas E. (1998). Where They're Buried. Baltimore, MD: Clearfield Company, Inc. p. 198. ISBN 978-0-8063-4823-0.

=== Other ===
- "Col. Stump Dead". The Aegis. January 12, 1917. p. 3 – via Newspapers.com.

Political offices
Preceded by Edward Lloyd	President of the Maryland Senate; 1880	Succeeded by George Williams
Preceded by William D. Owen	Commissioner General of Immigration; 1893–1897	Succeeded by Terence V. Powderly
U.S. House of Representatives
Preceded by Frank Shaw	Member of the U.S. House of Representatives from Maryland's 2nd congressional district 1889–1893	Succeeded by Joshua Talbott
