= John Hubner =

American politician

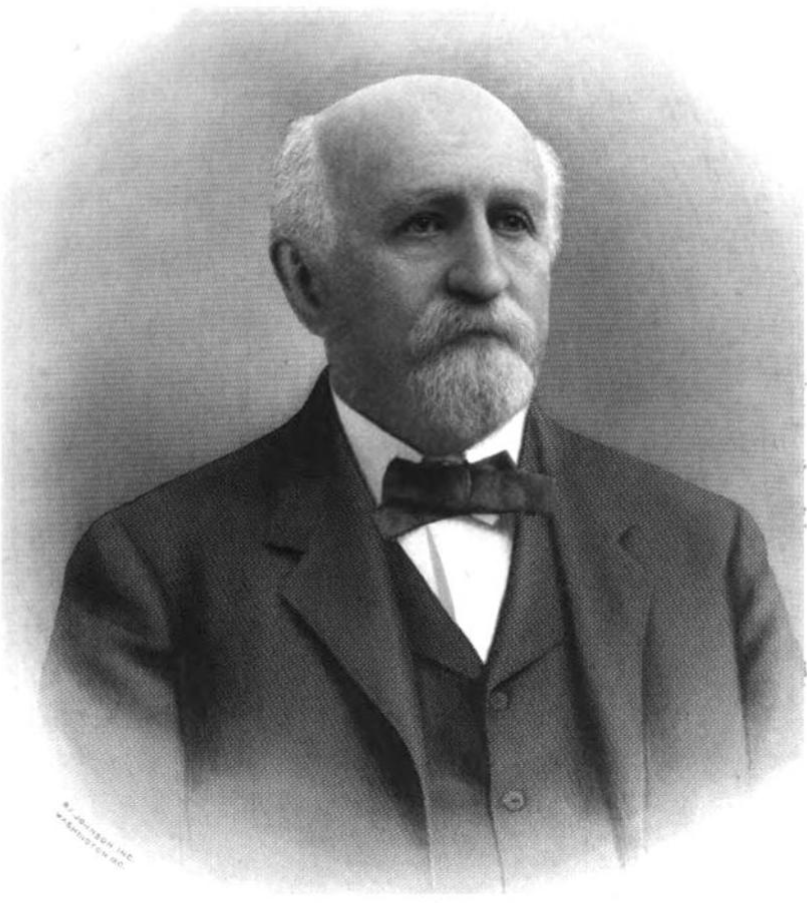

Member of the Maryland Senate
- In office 1900–1904
- Preceded by: D. Hopper Emory
- Succeeded by: John S. Biddison
- In office 1892–1896
- Preceded by: James J. Lindsay
- Succeeded by: D. Hopper Emory

Member of the Maryland House of Delegates
- In office 1886–1892

Personal details
- Born: December 26, 1840 Bavaria, Germany
- Died: September 8, 1920 (aged 79) Baltimore, Maryland, U.S.
- Party: Democratic
- Spouse: Mary A. Harken (m. 1863)
- Children: 14
- Occupation: Politician; real estate developer
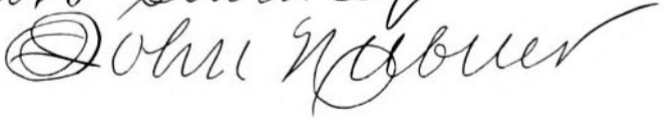
- Signature

John Hubner (December 26, 1840 – September 8, 1920) was a member of the Maryland House of Delegates and Maryland Senate.

== Early life ==
John Hubner was born on December 26, 1840, in Bavaria, Germany to Michael and Mary Hubner. His father was a lumber dealer and they emigrated in 1855 and settled in Baltimore, Maryland. Hubner attended school in villages in Bavaria and completed his education in Baltimore.

== Career ==
Hubner was the proprietor of the Relay House on the Baltimore and Ohio Railroad during the American Civil War. It was one of the primary gateways between the North and the South during the war.

In 1868, Hubner started working in the business of brick manufacturing. In 1869, Hubner started to get involved in real estate investment and became a developer. He was president of the Catonsville Improvement Company, president of the Maryland Real Estate Company, director in the Maryland Casualty Company and director in the First National Bank. In 1895, Hubner was one of the principal organizers of the American Bonding Company and served as its first president.

Hubner was a Democrat. He was elected as a member of the Maryland House of Delegates in 1886 and served until 1892. He was Speaker of House of the body in 1890. In 1892, Hubner was elected to the Maryland Senate and served until 1896. He was elected again to the senate in 1900 and served until 1904. He served as president of the Senate his last two terms, from 1901 to 1902.

Hubner served as the head of Springfield State Hospital in Sykesville, Maryland. He became vice president of Springfield in 1895.

== Personal life ==
Hubner married Mary A. Harken of Anne Arundel County in September 1863. Together, they had fourteen children.

Hubner died on September 8, 1920, after two operations at Maryland General Hospital in Baltimore.
