= Carl V. Sheridan =

United States Army Medal of Honor recipient

Carl Vernon Sheridan
- Born: January 5, 1925; Baltimore, Maryland, US
- Died: November 26, 1944 (aged 19); Weisweiler, Germany
- Burial place: Druid Ridge Cemetery; Pikesville, Maryland
- Military career
- Allegiance: United States
- Branch: United States Army
- Service years: 1943 - 1944
- Rank: Private First Class
- Units: 47th Infantry Regiment, 9th Infantry Division
- Conflicts: World War II
- Awards: Medal of Honor

Carl Vernon Sheridan (January 5, 1925 – November 26, 1944) was a United States Army soldier and a recipient of the United States military's highest decoration—the Medal of Honor—for his actions in World War II.

== Biography ==
Sheridan joined the Army from his birth city of Baltimore, Maryland in May 1943, and by November 26, 1944, was serving as a private first class in Company K, 47th Infantry Regiment, 9th Infantry Division. On that day, at the Frenzenberg Castle in Weisweiler, Germany, Sheridan exposed himself to intense fire in order to blast a hole through the doors of the enemy-held castle with his bazooka. He successfully created a gap in the doors, but was killed after charging through it. He was posthumously awarded the Medal of Honor six months later, on May 30, 1945.

Sheridan, aged 19 at his death, was buried in Druid Ridge Cemetery, Pikesville, Maryland.

== Medal of Honor citation ==
Private First Class Sheridan's official Medal of Honor citation reads:

Attached to the 2d Battalion of the 47th Infantry on November 26, 1944, for the attack on Frenzenberg Castle, in the vicinity of Weisweiler, Germany, Company K, after an advance of 1,000 yards through a shattering barrage of enemy artillery and mortar fire, had captured 2 buildings in the courtyard of the castle but was left with an effective fighting strength of only 35 men. During the advance, Pfc. Sheridan, acting as a bazooka gunner, had braved the enemy fire to stop and procure the additional rockets carried by his ammunition bearer who was wounded. Upon rejoining his company in the captured buildings, he found it in a furious fight with approximately 70 enemy paratroopers occupying the castle gate house. This was a solidly built stone structure surrounded by a deep water-filled moat 20 feet wide. The only approach to the heavily defended position was across the courtyard and over a drawbridge leading to a barricaded oaken door. Pfc. Sheridan, realizing that his bazooka was the only available weapon with sufficient power to penetrate the heavy oak planking, with complete disregard for his own safety left the protection of the buildings and in the face of heavy and intense small-arms and grenade fire, crossed the courtyard to the drawbridge entrance where he could bring direct fire to bear against the door. Although handicapped by the lack of an assistant, and a constant target for the enemy fire that burst around him, he skillfully and effectively handled his awkward weapon to place two well-aimed rockets into the structure. Observing that the door was only weakened, and realizing that a gap must be made for a successful assault, he loaded his last rocket, took careful aim, and blasted a hole through the heavy planks. Turning to his company he shouted, "Come on, let's get them!" With his .45 pistol blazing, he charged into the gaping entrance and was killed by the withering fire that met him. The final assault on Frezenberg Castle was made through the gap which Pfc. Sheridan gave his life to create.

== Dedications ==
In Augsburg, Germany, the Sheridan-Kaserne, the united site of what used to be three Wehrmacht barracks, was named after Carl V. Sheridan in 1953. After the withdrawal of the American forces from the Sheridan-Barracks in 1998, a new concept for the use of the large area called Sheridan Park was worked out. In its implementation almost all buildings of the barracks were demolished from 2006 onwards.

Sheridan-Hood Veterans of Foreign Wars Post 3065 in the Hampden neighborhood of Baltimore, MD was founded in 1945 and is named in part in memory of Pfc. Sheridan.

== See also ==
- List of Medal of Honor recipients
- List of Medal of Honor recipients for World War II
