= 240 East 38th Street =

Commercial building in Manhattan, New York

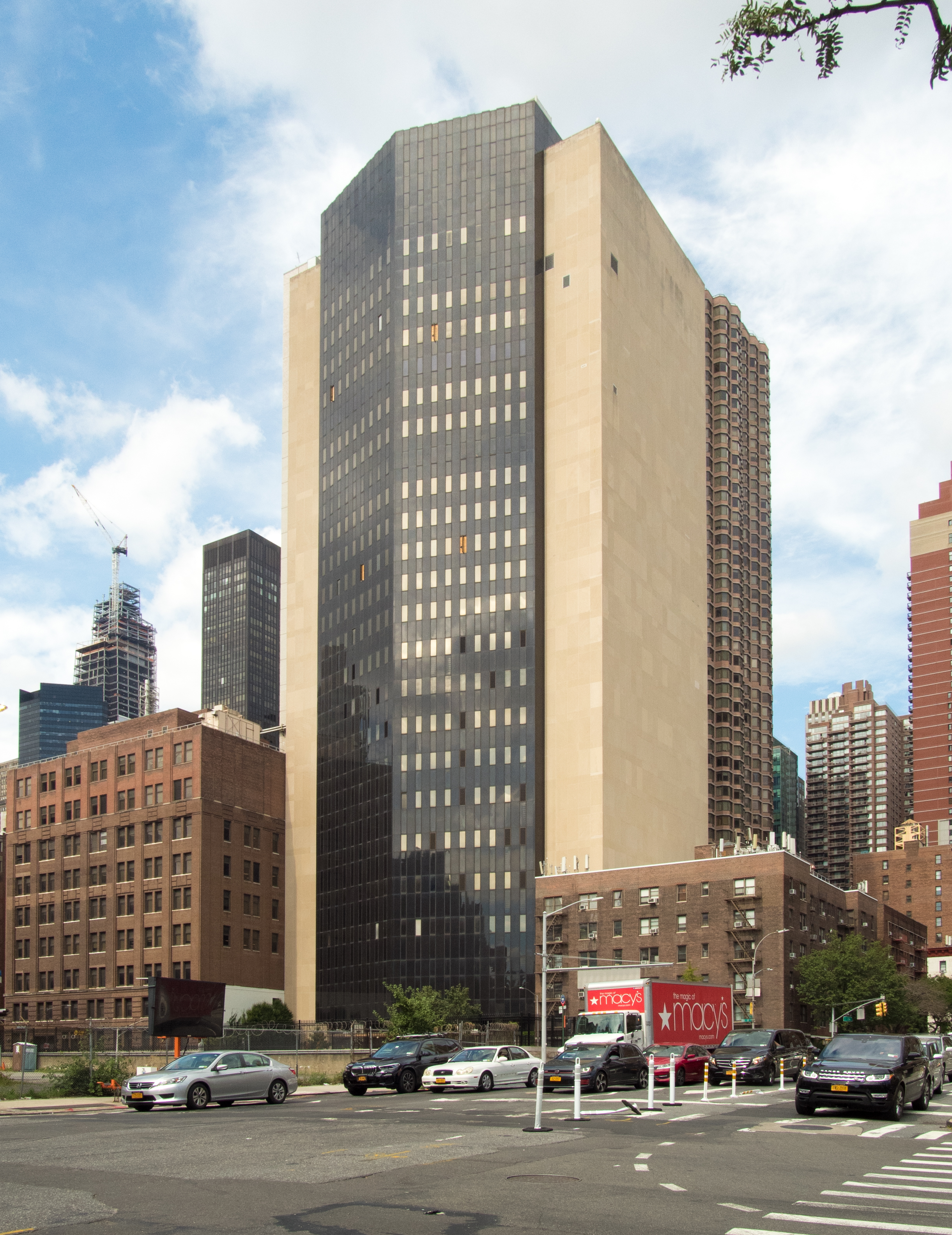
- The building viewed from the south in 2019
- Former names: New York Telephone Building, Verizon Building
- Alternative names: NYU Langone Ambulatory Care Center

General information
- Architectural style: Modern
- Location: 240 East 38th Street, New York City, United States
- Coordinates: 40°44′50″N 73°58′30″W
- Groundbreaking: July 13, 1965
- Completed: 1967
- Renovated: 2010–2014

Height
- Height: 385 ft (117 m)

Technical details
- Floor count: 24

Design and construction
- Architecture firm: Kahn & Jacobs
- Developer: The New York Telephone Company
- Structural engineer: Weiskopf & Pickworth
- Services engineer: Syska & Hennessy

240 East 38th Street is a 24-story commercial building in the Murray Hill neighborhood of Manhattan in New York City. Located between Second and Third avenues with frontages on both East 37th and 38th streets, the building was completed in 1967 as an office and communication center for The New York Telephone Company. The hexagonal-shaped skyscraper was the first project to leverage 1965 revisions to the city's 1961 Zoning Resolution, which had previously required buildings to have walls parallel to the street line. In 2010, Verizon New York converted the building to office condominiums. The building has primarily housed an ambulatory care center operated by NYU Langone Health since 2012.

== History ==
The 24-story building was originally constructed as an office and communications center for The New York Telephone Company. Located at 233 East 37th Street between Second and Third avenues, the site extended back to include a frontage on East 38th Street and also adjoined the telephone company's Murray Hill central office building at 221 East 37th Street. A groundbreaking ceremony for the new building was held on July 13, 1965, which was attended by several city officials including Paul R. Screvane, president of the City Council.

Designed by the architecture firm of Kahn & Jacobs, the hexagonal-shaped skyscraper was the first project to leverage 1965 revisions to the city's 1961 Zoning Resolution, which had previously required buildings to have walls parallel to the street line. The changes to the zoning regulations, which had been proposed by Robert Allan Jacobs of Kahn & Jacobs to the Department of Buildings in November 1964, enabled the building to provide 20,000 square feet (1,900 m^{2}) on each floor with an angular facade, compared to only 18,000 square feet (1,700 m^{2}) per floor that would have been possible under the original zoning regulations. The building was completed in 1967 and the telephone company moved into the new facility by the following year.

In 2005, Verizon New York (formerly The New York Telephone Company) began selling many of its buildings in New York City due to reductions in equipment requirements as customers switched from landlines to cell phones. Many of the properties were turned into residential condominiums, while others were turned into medical offices, hotel rooms, or office space. In November 2010, Verizon New York established the 240 East 38th Street Condominium to maintain ownership of portions of the premises and to accommodate conversion of other parts of the building into a condominium form of ownership.

In December 2010, New York University Langone Medical Center (NYU) purchased over half of the property at 240 East 38th Street and began converting the space into an ambulatory care center. NYU purchased additional units at the site in September 2011 and December 2011. The new medical office space was originally intended to provide temporary accommodations for some of the programs located in buildings on the northern part of the medical center's campus on First Avenue that would be demolished in order to make way for construction of the Kimmel Pavilion. NYU also modified the public plazas at 240 East 38th Street to accommodate the ambulatory care center, adding a driveway with a canopy for patient drop-offs to the plaza on the north side of the building, a trellis and a baffle wall to the plaza on the south side of the building, and new seating areas, planters and additional lighting.

The 327,000-square-foot (30,400 m^{2}) ambulatory care center, which occupied 14 floors of the building, opened to patients in May 2012. The first program to occupy the new space was the Multiple Sclerosis Comprehensive Care Center, which was followed the next month by administrative offices, research facilities, and non-musculoskeletal outpatient services for the Rusk Institute of Rehabilitation Medicine. New York-based artist Daru (Jung Hyang Kim) was commissioned to create two works of public art for the new facility: Floating Bubbles and Whimsical Rays, a 12-by-20-foot (3.7 m × 6.1 m) laminated glass piece fabricated by Glasmalerei Peters Studio and that is backlit with LED lights and installed in the lobby on the north side of the building and Sun Feast, a 12-by-24-foot (3.7 m × 7.3 m) mosaic fabricated by Miotto Mosaic Art Studios consisting of over 54,000 pieces that is installed in the plaza on the south side of the building. Both of her commissions were unveiled in 2013. The ambulatory care center was completed in 2014.

== Architecture ==
According to architect Robert Allan Jacobs of Kahn & Jacobs, their client "wanted something better than the usual institutional building" and if they had "conformed with the original zoning regulations they would have produced a 'ghastly looking' building". The firm's desire to create a "distinctive design" with an angular facade shaped like the prow of a ship is what prompted them to propose changes to the city's zoning regulations. The side walls of the building are clad in limestone and the angular portion of the facade has alternating columns of 3-foot-wide (0.91 m) black granite strips and windows tinted in bronze with black aluminum framing. The north and south sides of the building each contained a landscaped plaza having a depth of 50 feet (15 m) and a width of 150 feet (46 m).

In a 1975 article about the city's telephone company buildings, The New York Times architecture critic Paul Goldberger described Kahn & Jacob's design on East 37th Street as "a decent equipment building" and set it above "a number of buildings that can only be described as dreadful" including 375 Pearl Street, 811 Tenth Avenue and 1095 Avenue of the Americas. Robert A. M. Stern and the co-authors of his 1995 book New York 1960 described the building's design as "otherwise banal, and it offered no real direction for a renewal of architectural aesthetics or an improved urbanism."
