= Empire City Subway =

American company

Empire City Subway Company, Ltd.
- Type: Subsidiary
- Industry: Telecommunications
- Founded: 1891; 135 years ago
- Headquarters: 140 West Street, New York, NY 10007, United States
- Area served: New York City, New York
- Products: Underground conduits
- Parent: Verizon New York
- Website: empirecitysubway.com

Empire City Subway is an American company in New York City which is responsible for maintaining underground conduits in Manhattan and The Bronx, and the manholes by which those conduits are accessed.

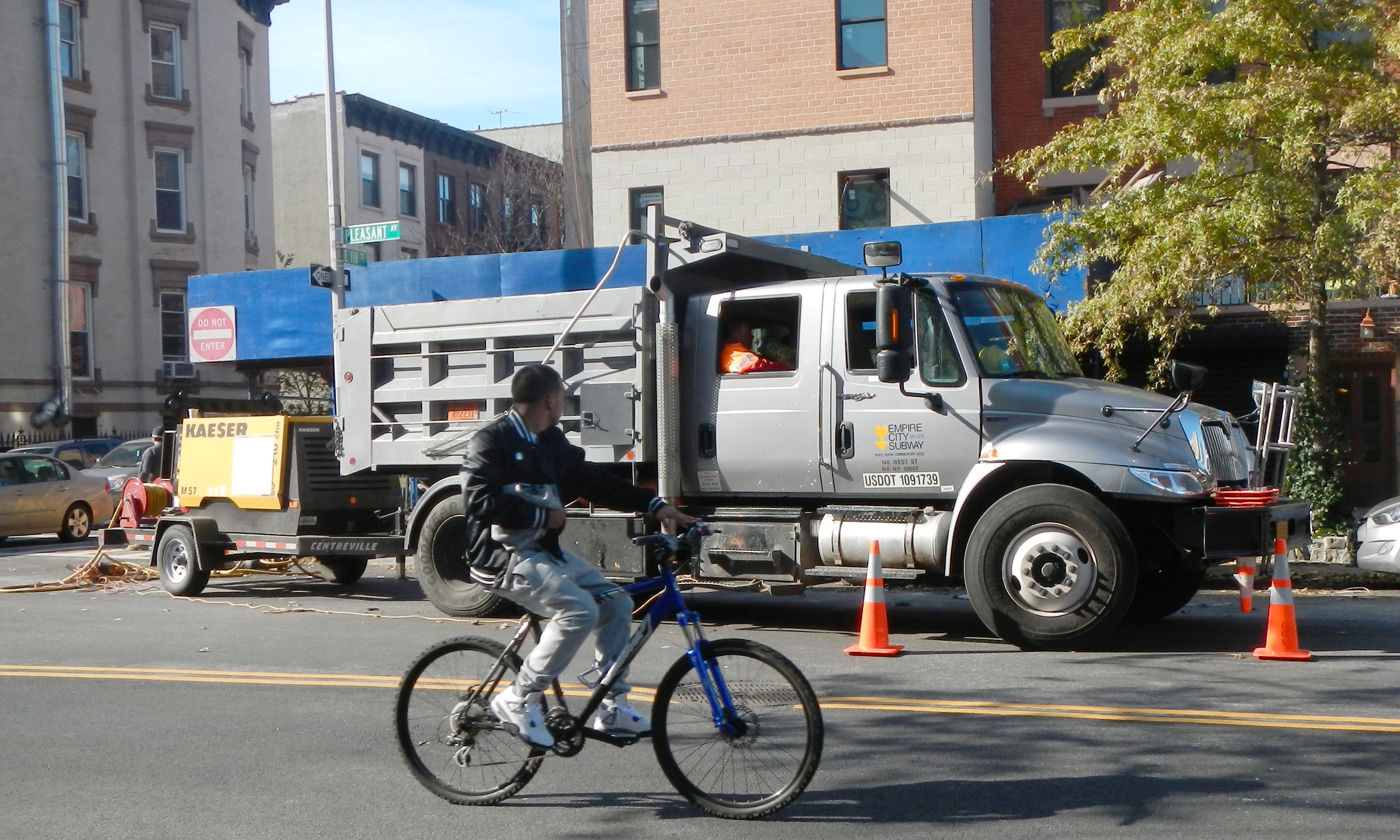
ECS truck in East Harlem

== History and operations ==
The company was formed in 1891 as part of a plan for common utility ducts to consolidate all utilities underground. Incompatibility among the utilities limited the range of utilities that could share their ducts, so the company now operates as a wholly owned subsidiary of Verizon New York Telephone under a franchise from the city. In addition to Verizon, the company provides service to cable television and other telecommunications companies.

== Business model ==
Presided over by Gene Michael Bradley. Empire City Subway makes its money by renting manhole space and conduits to New York City Office of Technology and Innovation telecommunications franchisees. Although wholly owned by Verizon, Verizon is their largest tenant in the Empire City Subway system.

They have construction crews on staff that perform excavation for conduit and points of entry (POEs) for their tenants and well as rodding and roping services so tenants may pull new cable through the ducts.

Tenants that choose to pull their own cables through the system are overseen by the Manhole Activity Program (MAP) Group. There is a fee charged per hour to the tenants for this service.

== Manholes ==
Manholes owned by Empire City Subway can be recognized by the abbreviation ECS (or ECS Co. Ltd) cast into the metal covers. This should not be confused with CT & ES (Consolidated Telegraph & Electrical Subway), now owned by the Electrical utility, Consolidated Edison of New York.

== See also ==
- List of companies based in New York City
