= John De Cesare =

American sculptor and draftsman

John De Cesare (1890–1972) was an American ornamental sculptor working on New York Art Deco buildings during the 1920s and 1930s. In 1948, he retired from sculpture to engage in architectural pencil drawings, especially translating musical scores into graphic representation.

== Biography ==
De Cesare was born in Palermo, Italy in 1890. His parents emigrated to the US in 1895. He studied sculpture at the Cooper Union Art School, NY. During the 1920s, he worked as ornamental sculptor for architects like McKenzie, Vorrhees and Gemlin. In the 1930s, he created his own company, Stifter & De Cesare, with up to 50 employees until it ceased activities, around 1945-48. He then retired and devoted his time to architectural drawing until his death in New York in 1972.

== Sculpture ==
From 1916 on, the 1916 Zoning Resolution increased the number of skyscrapers being built in New York. Buildings were also meant to convey a strong corporate identity through architecture and ornaments. The prevalent architectural Art Deco style was characterized by the variety of materials used (steel, concrete, aluminium, stone, brick, ceramics, glass, etc.) and its exotic inspiration. John de Cesare created sculptural ornaments or bas-reliefs sculptures with motifs such as fruits, grapes, animals or humans, for the following buildings: the Verizon Building in Lower Manhattan (1923–27); the 1 Wall Street building (1929–32); and the Empire State Building (1927–29).

== Drawings ==
In 1948, John de Cesare retired from sculpture and started working privately on an amazing series of 250 color pencil drawings also influenced by Art Deco's ornamental style. These were architectural drawings translating information from business charts, photographs, songs or music scores. Cesare had devised a coherent system to translate almost any kind of information into graphic representations. 20 of these drawings were based on musical scores, from The Star-Spangled Banner to Wagner, from Stephen Foster's Swanee River, to Beethoven's Fifth Symphony, from Gounod's Ave Maria to a Bach Prelude. He devised a system of sound units where millimeters represented duration and pitch, what he calls the Space Rule Keys system. Notes become triangles where height equals pitch and length equals duration. Especially noticeable is a series of 5 drawings from 1956 translating Wagner’s Ride of the Valkyries (from Die Walküre, 1870). Most of his drawings are in the collections of the Cooper-Hewitt National Design Museum, Smithsonian Institution, New York. The Museum organized a retrospective exhibition to John De Cesare in 1984.
