= 1975 New York Telephone exchange fire =

1975 fire in New York City

1975 New York Telephone Exchange Fire
- Date: 27 February 1975
- Time: 00:25 EST (5:25 UTC)
- Location: 204 Second Avenue, New York, NY; 40.7314°N 73.9852°W
- Cause: Cable fire

On February 27, 1975, a fire broke out at the New York Telephone Company switching center at 204 Second Avenue and Thirteenth Street in the East Village of Manhattan, New York City. At this time, the building contained central offices for connecting local customer telephone lines, as well as toll switching systems. The fire disrupted service for 175,000 customers, connected within the building through 105,000 service loops. It was the worst single service disaster suffered by any single Bell operating company in the 20th century.

The events relating to the fire make it notable for reasons including the extent of the disruption and the large scale and speed of the recovery efforts, which were completed in 23 days. Studies of the fire influenced the adoption of new fire safety rules for installation of low-voltage wiring inside buildings, especially in areas that can spread fire or toxic fumes. Decades later, the polyvinyl chloride (PVC) combustion products produced by the fire were identified as a reason for elevated rates of cancer in the firefighters at the scene.

== History ==
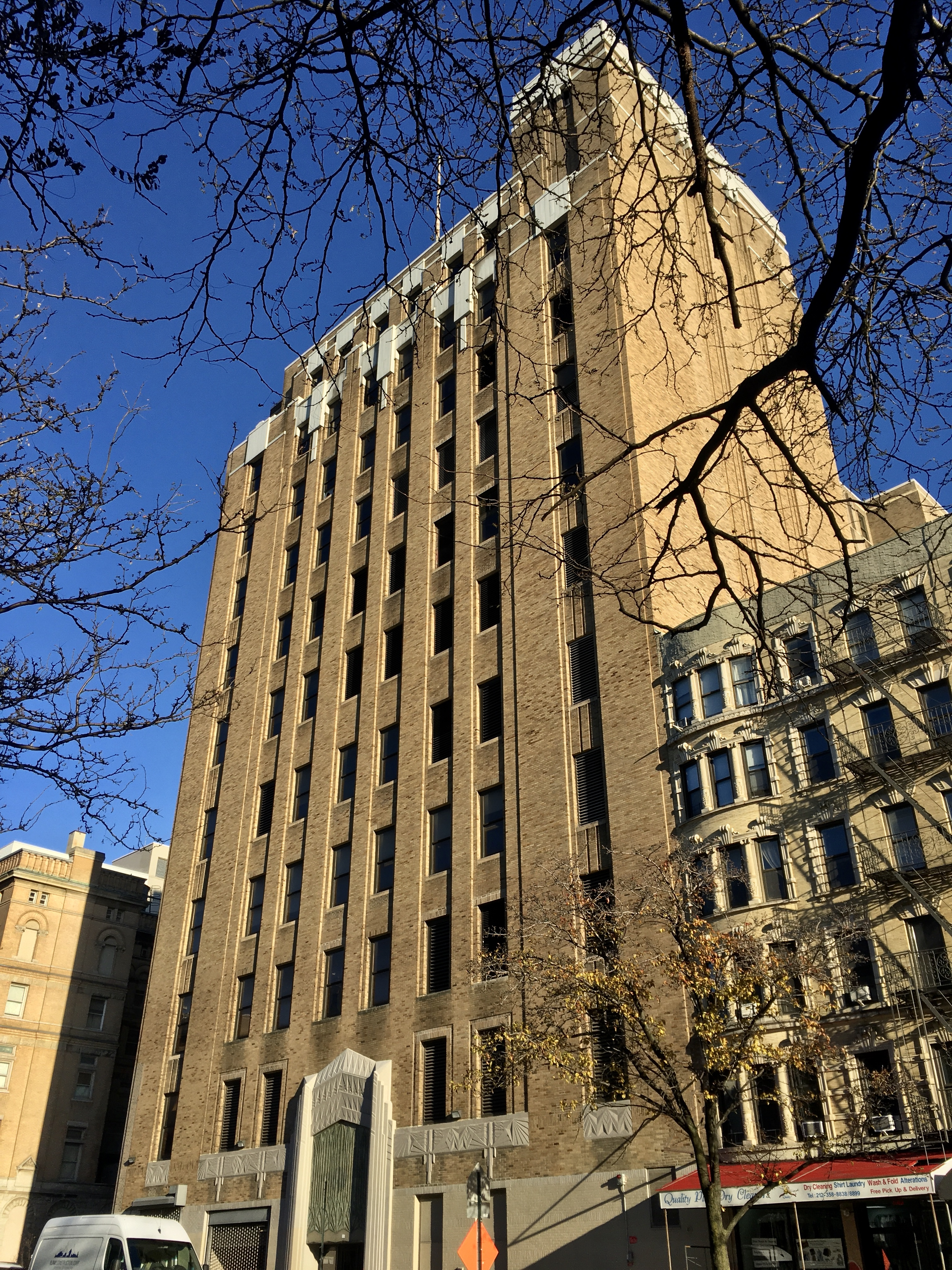
New York Telephone (now Verizon) 204 Second Avenue building in November 2019.

The 204 Second Avenue building was erected in two stages: The first three floors were completed in 1923 and an additional eight stories were added in 1929-1930. At that time telephone companies were using electromechanical panel switches and, later, crossbar switches. As demand for telephone service increased in later decades, older equipment remained in service and worked alongside new equipment installed for expanded service. The building housed the main distribution frame and contained twelve exchanges and five toll switching machines. All of this equipment took up enormous space and by the time of the 1975 fire it was interconnected with tons of cable, much of it sheathed in PVC. The burning cables emitted hydrochloric acid, benzene, and vinyl chloride. During the blaze, accumulated gases caused an explosion powerful enough to knock down firefighters outside the building.

By the mid-1970s, the Bell System was converting to newer electronic switching systems that required only a fraction of the former space and had a greater capacity than the electromechanical switches. Newer exchanges usually were equipped with the latest technology. In replacing the destroyed equipment at Second Avenue, AT&T was able to divert equipment and supplies intended for other locations to the rebuilding of the Second Avenue central offices.

== Fire progression ==
Just after midnight on February 27, 1975, a short circuit in the basement cable vault, where underground cables enter the building, started a fire. Fifteen employees were working in the building at the time. An internal alarm was sounded at 12:15 a.m. when smoke was discovered in the third-floor subscriber distribution frame. All employees safely evacuated the building but one reported that smoke was already filling the stairways. The maintenance man on duty was alerted to the fire and attempted to call the fire department, but the internal telephone lines were already disrupted. He had to use a street call box to alert the fire department, where the first alarm was sounded at 12:25 a.m.

Upon arrival, firefighters found the entire building filled with smoke with the heaviest on the lower floors. It was difficult to pinpoint the source of the fire due to the smoke and difficulty in getting into the cable vault. Windows were constructed with wire mesh glass and further shielded with plastic or metal screens to protect switching equipment. Dust shields of steel and wired glass presented obstacles. The fire had spread to the first floor through a narrow slot that passed cable up to the distribution frame. The fire then progressed vertically through cable chases. Firefighters attempted to spray foam into the cable vault only to have the foam drain down into a sub-basement. The incident escalated to five alarms.

Fumes from the burning cables awakened and sickened residents on East 13th Street. Some dressed hastily and left their apartments to get further away from the fire. The nearby New York Eye and Ear Infirmary sent patients home or transferred them to other hospitals. Smoke poured from a fissure in the building and an adjacent structure was evacuated in fear that the telephone building might collapse. The fire was at first declared under control at 3:40 pm, but shortly after that flared up again. It was officially declared under control at 4:46 p.m. The fire burned for over 19 hours before being completely extinguished.

== Disruption and restoration of telephone service ==
The fire had destroyed 488 vault cables and all equipment on the first and second floors. Smoke and corrosion damaged switching equipment all the way up to the top floor. The fire cut off telephone service to a 300 block area of Manhattan that included three hospitals, three police stations, two universities and the main headquarters of ConEdison.

The response to the emergency was quick with New York Telephone, parent company AT&T, research division Bell Laboratories and the equipment manufacturing arm Western Electric coordinating the restoration effort. Radio telephones and coin telephone trailers were brought in from three states and positioned throughout the affected area. A recently retired panel switch at the West 18th Street exchange was reactivated. A main distribution frame normally took six months to manufacture and install but one ready for shipment to another office was located at Western Electric and diverted to New York. Remarkably, it only took them four days to install. Damaged switching equipment contacts were manually cleaned and millions of individual wires spliced by hand. Five thousand employees collaborated to restore service. Twenty-three days later service was restored entirely. AT&T commissioned a documentary filmmaker to record the recovery work which was released under the title Miracle on Second Avenue.

== Health risks ==
No firefighters were killed at the telephone building site during the fire, but many later developed cancer attributed to the chemical toxins that were released during the fire. The burning toxins from the PVC insulated wiring that burned has shown heightened risks of cancer years after exposure. Approximately forty cases of cancer can be linked back to the fire. Dr. Steven Lin, a doctor at the Mt. Sinai School of Medicine, investigated the relationship between the toxins and the cancers developed by firefighters. He concluded that polyvinyl chloride, a chemical present during the fire, leads to various types of cancer. However, these cancers are developed twenty years after exposure.

During the fire, the Fire Department of New York did not document the medical records of the firefighters, making it nearly impossible to track their health progress. Instead, they put a red stamp on the firefighters' documents that said "Telephone Exchange Fire" to simply show they were there. In 1997, The Fire Department interviewed two hundred and thirty-nine firefighters involved in the fire and found eighteen had died, including every member of Ladder Co. 6 that responded to the fire. Seven of these eighteen deaths were from cancer and six of those deaths were from first responders. The average age of those deaths was fifty. By the 1990s the City of New York considered cancer in firefighters to be job-related and compensated by paying then a 75% pension rather than the standard 50% pension. However, if the cancer was diagnosed after retirement, there was no additional compensation.

== Impact on fire and building regulations ==
The fire originated from sparks in equipment in the basement cable vault igniting the plastic insulation of nearby cables that ran to all of the floors above. The combination of the flammable insulation and the method of penetrating each floor allowed the fire to spread rapidly, and emit toxic fumes that are alleged to have caused later deaths of over a dozen firefighters. Chief of Department James Leonard, whose father worked as a switch operator, said "I've never seen smoke like that, conditions were brutal. It tested the skills, training and ability of all members responding that day."

The resulting fire safety regulations include various codes that relate to plenum cable:

- Standard for the Installation of Air-Conditioning and Ventilating Systems The original restrictions on cable ratings date from 1937 were relaxed in 1975, and then increased again by the National Electrical Code.
- National Electrical Code (same as NFPA 70): NEC Article 725, NEC Article 760, and NEC Article 800
- NFPA 255
- NFPA 262
- UL 910
- UL 444
