= 375 Pearl Street =

Office skyscraper in Manhattan, New York

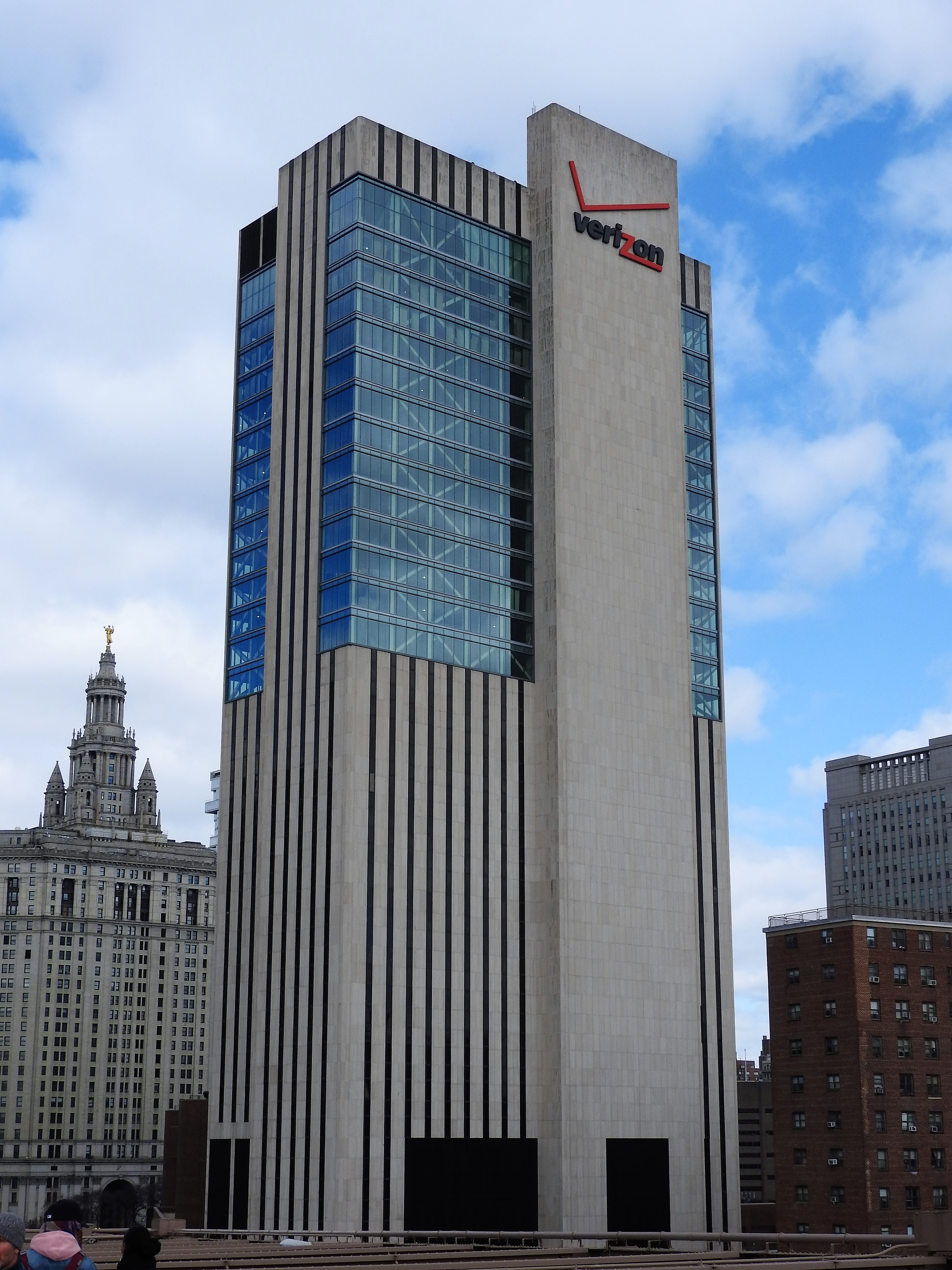
- Seen in 2018 with the old logo, after its 2016 renovation

General information
- Type: Office
- Location: Manhattan, New York City
- Coordinates: 40°42′39″N 74°00′04″W
- Completed: 1975
- Renovated: 2016–2018
- Owner: Sabey Data Centers Properties

Height
- Roof: 540 feet (160 m)

Technical details
- Floor count: 32
- Floor area: 1.098 million square feet (102×10^{3} m^{2})

Design and construction
- Architects: Rose, Beaton & Rose

375 Pearl Street (also known as the Intergate.Manhattan, One Brooklyn Bridge Plaza, and Verizon Building) is a 32-story office and datacenter building in the Civic Center of Lower Manhattan in New York City, at the Manhattan end of the Brooklyn Bridge. It was built for the New York Telephone Company and completed in 1975. It was renovated in 2016.

== History ==
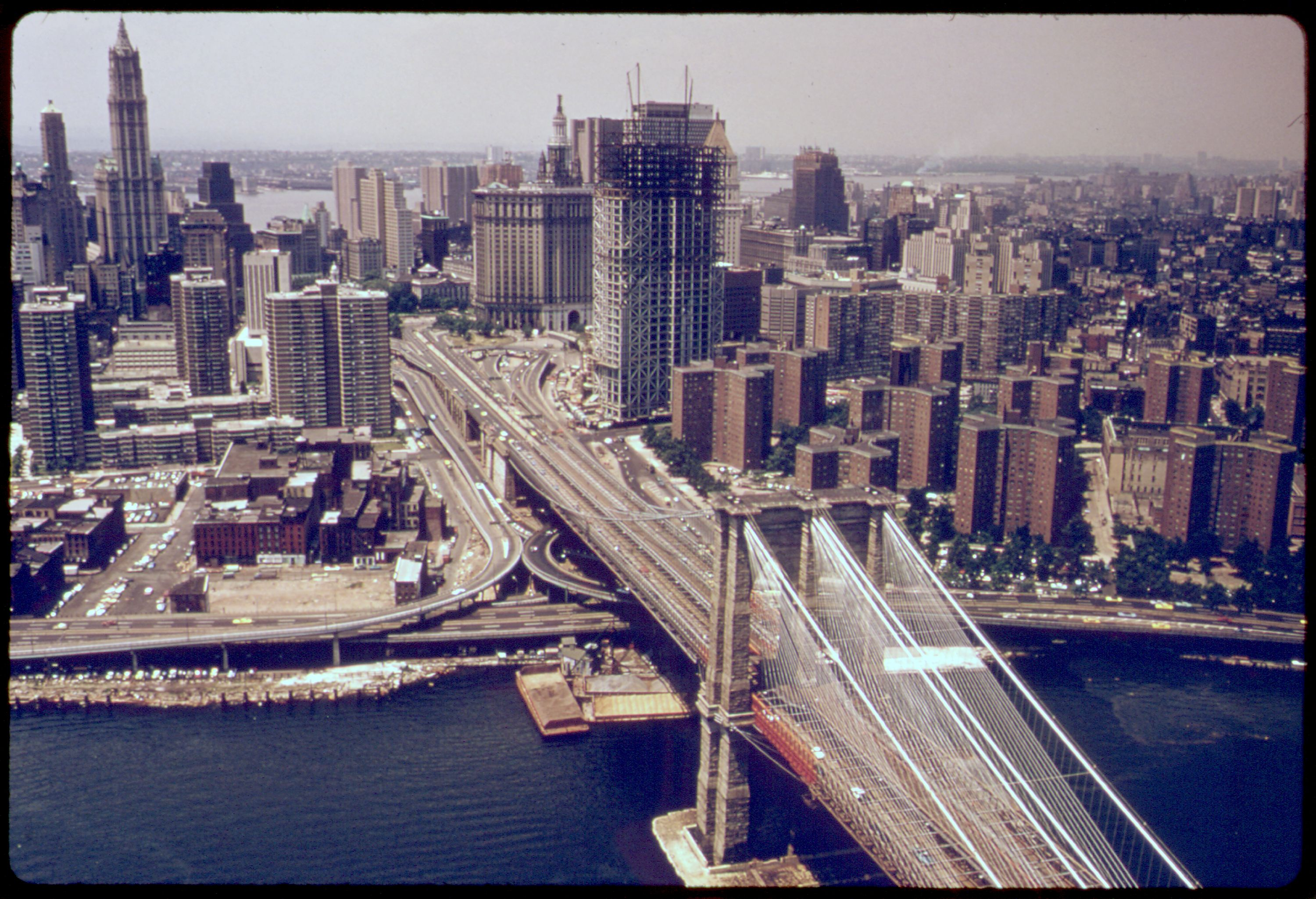
The building under construction in 1974

The building was built for the New York Telephone Company and was completed in 1975. The building originally appeared windowless but had several 3-foot-wide slits (0.91 m) (some with glass) running up the building. As it approached completion, The New York Times architecture critic Paul Goldberger decried it as the "most disturbing" of the phone company's new switching centers because it "overwhelms the Brooklyn Bridge towers, thrusts a residential neighborhood into shadow and sets a tone of utter banality."

In the 1990s and 2000s, Verizon switching operations included a small DMS-100 telephone exchange and a Switching Control Center System. The building's CLLI code, its identification in the telecommunications industry, was NYCMNYPS. The Pearl Street CS2K softswitch was the recipient of voice traffic from decommissioned legacy switches in the city.

=== 2000s ===
Prior to 2002, the building featured the logo of New York Telephone and Bell Atlantic; that year, the sign was replaced with the logo of Verizon.

In September 2007 it was announced that Taconic Investment Partners had purchased the building from Verizon, which leased back floors 8 through 10. Taconic bought the 1.098-million-square-foot building (102,000 m^{2}) for $172.05 million, which amounted to $185 a foot when property was selling in Manhattan for $500 a foot. Other appeals of the building were its 16- to 17-foot (5.2 m) ceilings and 39,000-square-foot (3,600 m^{2}) floor plans as well as the naming rights. Taconic had announced plans to replace the facade with a glass curtain wall designed by Cookfox. The New York Times wrote:

Paul E. Pariser, co-chief executive of Taconic, said a reporter had told him: 'Mr. Pariser, you have a challenge cut out for you — turning a G.E. dishwasher into an office building.' I like that challenge.

=== 2010s to present ===
In early June 2011, data center operator Sabey Data Centers Properties purchased the deed in lieu of foreclosure from M&T Bank for $120 million, considerably less than what Taconic had paid a few years earlier. Sabey had initially intended to partner with YoungWoo & Associates but instead hired National Real Estate Advisors as its development partner. Sabey intended to redevelop the property as a major Manhattan data center and technology building called Intergate.Manhattan. John Sabey, president of the company, said Intergate.Manhattan would appeal to "new scientific, academic and medical research centers" in addition to data center tenants.

In 2012, The Daily Telegraph ranked 375 Pearl Street as the 20th "ugliest building in the world". Starting in 2016, the building was renovated. The limestone walls on the top 15 stories were removed and replaced with plate glass panels to improve the building's aesthetics and attract traditional office tenants. Leasing of the office stories had started in January 2016. Sabey placed the 15th through 30th stories for sale in 2018 for over $300 million. The space was instead leased to tenants like the New York City Police Department and Rafael Viñoly Architects. Viñoly Architects bought the floors that it occupied in July 2020.

Sabey and National Real Estate Advisors refinanced the building in June 2021. Wells Fargo and JPMorgan Chase gave the owners a $220 million fixed-rate loan as well as a $30 million mezzanine loan.

== Tenants ==
The building was traditionally home primarily to telecommunications tenants, but following the renovations has attracted numerous traditional office users. The New York City government occupies a significant area of the building including the NYPD with 106,000 square feet (9,800 m^{2}) on the 15th through 17th floors, the Human Resources Administration with 194,000 square feet (18,000 m^{2}), the Department of Finance with 175,000 square feet (16,300 m^{2}), and the Department of Sanitation with 72,000 square feet (6,700 m^{2}). Following the 2021 New York City mayoral election, the space also contained an office for mayor Eric Adams.

Following the renovation, Rafael Viñoly Architects signed a 20-year, 36,550 square feet (3,396 m^{2}) lease for the 31st floor of the building in July 2018.

== See also ==
- 33 Thomas Street
- Verizon Building, 140 West Street
