= Sabey Data Centers =

American data center company

- Type: Private
- Industry: Data centers
- Headquarters: Tukwila, Washington, United States
- Key people: Tim Mirick (President)
- Parent: Sabey Corporation
- Website: sabeydatacenters.com

Sabey Data Centers is a United States-based company engaged in the development, ownership and operation of multi-tenant data centers. It is the data-center business unit of Sabey Corporation, a privately held real-estate and development group based in Tukwila, Washington. The company reports managing more than 3.5 million square feet of data center space and nearly 400 megawatts of capacity across the U.S.

== History ==
Sabey Corporation was founded in 1972 by Dave Sabey and initially focused on commercial real estate development and construction across the Pacific Northwest. The dedicated data-center business emerged in the 2000s and grew through acquisitions and new campus developments.

In June 2011, Sabey acquired the 32-story former Verizon/NY Telephone building at 375 Pearl Street in Manhattan and began its conversion into an urban data-center facility. The retrofit opened in 2013.

In April 2020, Sabey issued US$800 million of securitized notes backed by data-center revenues to refinance debt and support expansion.

On January 1, 2025, Sabey announced that Tim Mirick would assume the role of president of Sabey Data Centers, succeeding Rob Rockwood.

== Structure and ownership ==
Sabey Data Center Properties, LLC is the joint-venture entity between Sabey Corporation and National Real Estate Advisors that owns and operates the data-center assets. In September 2023, the joint venture announced plans for a 100 MW+ campus in Umatilla, Oregon.

== Operations ==
Sabey develops and operates carrier-neutral multi-tenant colocation facilities, powered-shell and build-to-suit data centers. Its operations emphasise energy efficiency, modular build-to-suit capability, and a vertically integrated design-build-operate model. A case study by the New York State Energy Research & Development Authority (NYSERDA) documents efficiency upgrades at the Intergate Manhattan facility.

== Locations ==
As of 2025, Sabey lists campuses or facilities in the following U.S. markets:

- Seattle, Washington (formerly Intergate.East): 1.2 million square feet across multiple buildings and 54 MW of capacity. Originally developed (and purchased) by American aerospace company Boeing, but repurchased by Sabey in 1999.
- Quincy & East Wenatchee, Washington (Intergate): Columbia River region campuses powered primarily by hydroelectricity.
- Ashburn, Virginia:Third building under construction in 2025, targeting 54 MW for that building and ~85 MW total campus capacity.
- New York City: Intergate Manhattan at 375 Pearl Street, a retrofitted telecom building opened in 2013.
- Austin metro, Texas (Round Rock): Campus completed first building in October 2024 with 430,000 sq ft and up to 84 MW critical power.
- Umatilla, Oregon: Planned 60-acre, 100 MW+ site in development.

== Notable projects ==
- Intergate Manhattan (375 Pearl Street), New York City — Urban retrofit project converting a former telecom building into a modern data-center facility.
- SDC Austin (Round Rock), Texas — Campus supporting high-density workloads and liquid cooling, up to 84 MW build-out.

== Finance ==
In 2020, Sabey issued approximately US$800 million in securitized notes backed by tenant leases to raise capital for expansion.

== Sustainability ==
Sabey emphasises design for energy efficiency and modularity. A NYSERDA case study documents efficiency upgrades at the Intergate Manhattan site. In October 2025, the company announced 70 MW of additional capacity across six U.S. campuses.

== Community and regional impact ==
In 2025, a proposed Sabey-affiliated data-center project near San Marcos, Texas, drew local scrutiny over water-supply and environmental impacts.

Sabey is reported to be leasing ICE office space in Tukwila.

== See also ==
- Ashburn, Virginia
