= Verizon New York =

Telephone company in the mid-Atlantic US

Verizon New York, Inc.
- Type: Subsidiary
- Industry: Telecommunications
- Founded: 1896; 130 years ago
- Headquarters: 140 West Street, New York City 10036; US
- Area served: New York, Southwest Connecticut
- Products: POTS, DSL, FiOS (FTTP)
- Number of employees: 26,800 (2005)
- Parent: American Bell (1896-1899); AT&T (1899-1983); NYNEX (1984-1997); Bell Atlantic (1997-2000); Verizon Communications (2000-present)
- Subsidiaries: Empire City Subway; Verizon Enterprise Solutions; Verizon Long Distance
- Website: www.verizon.com

Verizon New York, Inc., formerly the New York Telephone Company (NYTel), was organized in 1896, taking over the New York City operations of the American Bell Telephone Company.

== Predecessor companies ==
The Telephone Company of New York was formed under franchise in 1876. The principals were Charles A. Cheever and Hilborne Roosevelt. Its purpose was to rent telephone instruments to users, who were expected to provide wires to connect them, for example from factory to office. Such connections already existed for private telegraphs, and the new invention promised to save the cost of hiring a private telegraph operator. Manufacturers of steel wire for the Brooklyn Bridge then under construction were especially prominent among the customers under this scheme, using their own product.

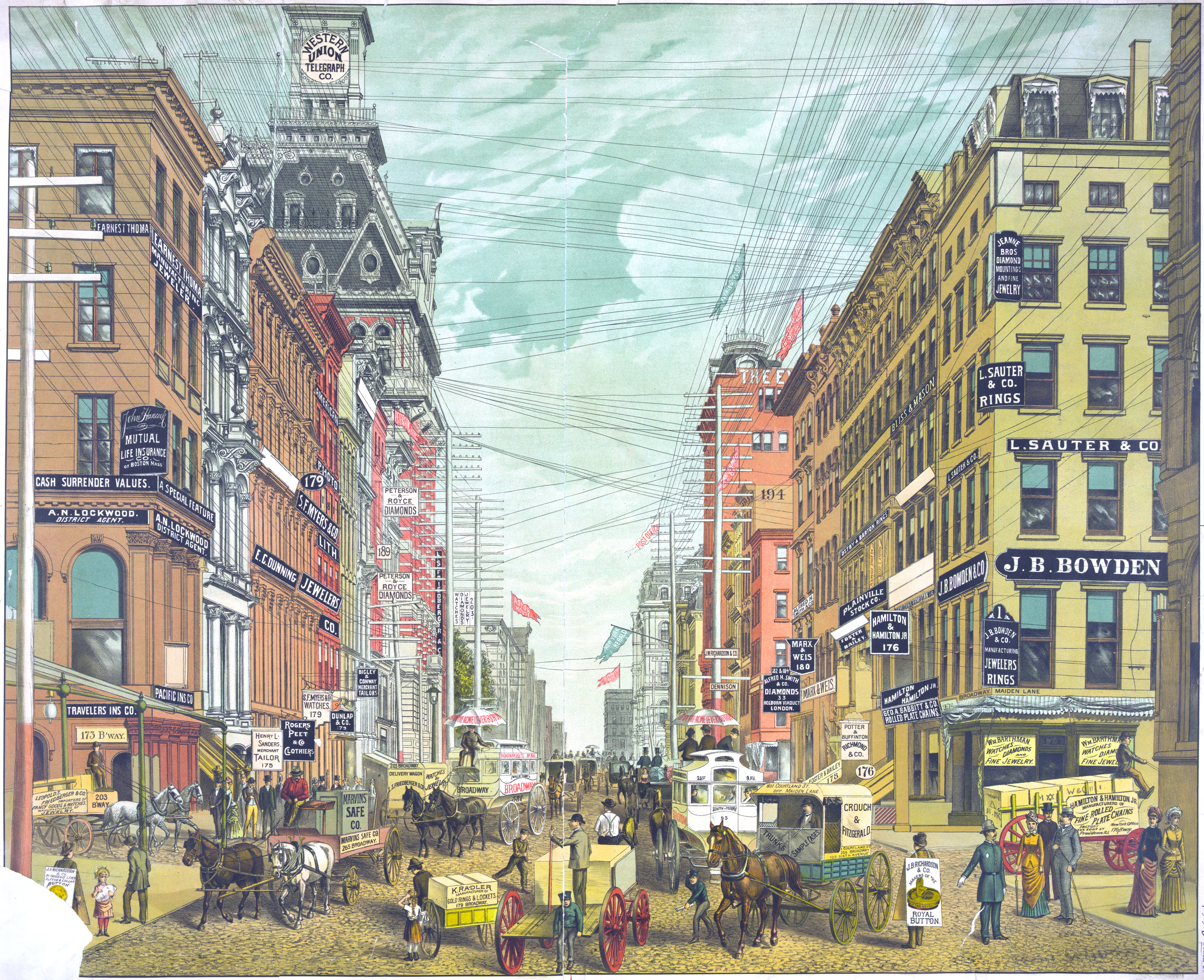
Wires installed above Broadway, 1885

Western Union subsidiaries, including Atlantic and Pacific Telegraph, Gold and Stock Telegraph, and American Speaking Telephone, based their New York and San Francisco operations on the telephone exchange principle and thus were larger and more advanced than the local Bell operations. Under the November 1879 settlement of the Elisha Gray patent infringement lawsuit, Western Union handed over its telephone operations to National Bell Telephone, which then renamed itself American Bell Telephone. The merged local company was called the Metropolitan Telephone and Telegraph Company. In 1896 the operations of Metropolitan Telephone and Telegraph Company and the Westchester Telephone Company (which served northern suburban areas, including parts of then-Westchester County which subsequently were incorporated into New York City as the borough of the Bronx) were consolidated under the name of the New York Telephone Company.

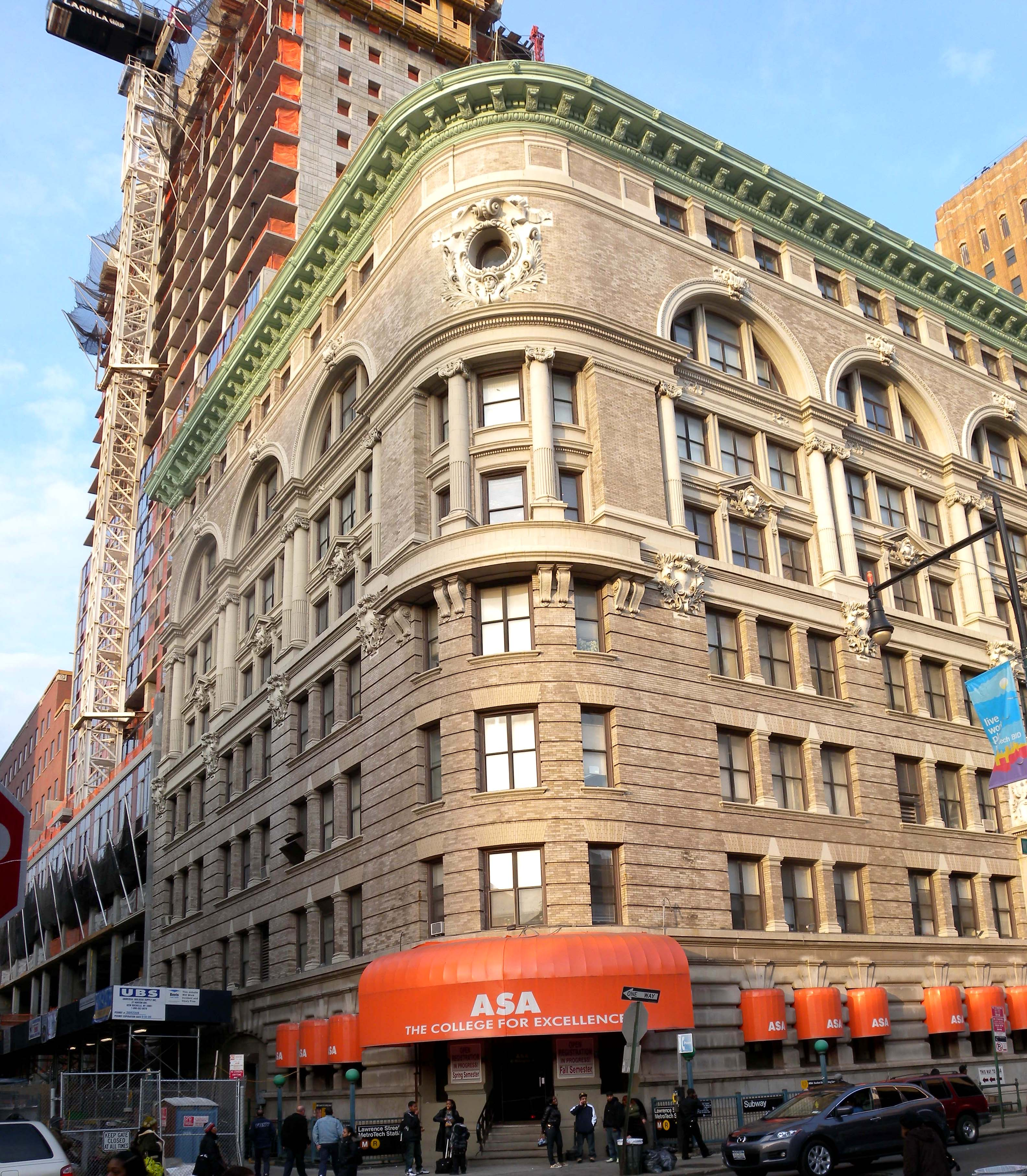
New York and New Jersey Telephone Company building

The New York and New Jersey Telephone Company, a Bell licensee serving Long Island and Staten Island, was broken up and its New York properties merged with the New York company as the City and Suburban Telephone Company in 1897. American Telephone and Telegraph (AT&T) eventually acquired a controlling interest and restored the New York Telephone name.

== Infrastructure ==
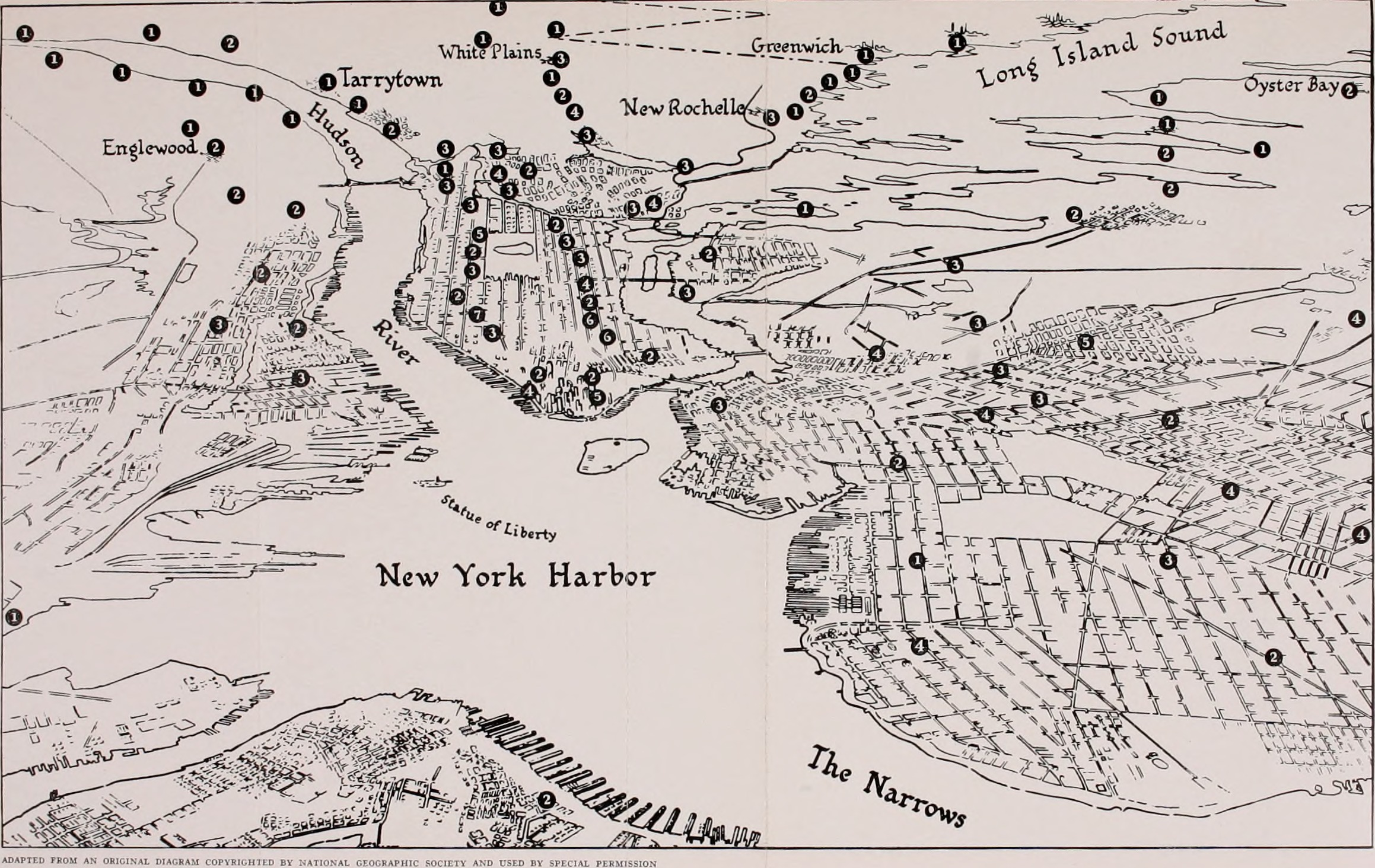
Exchange locations, 1934

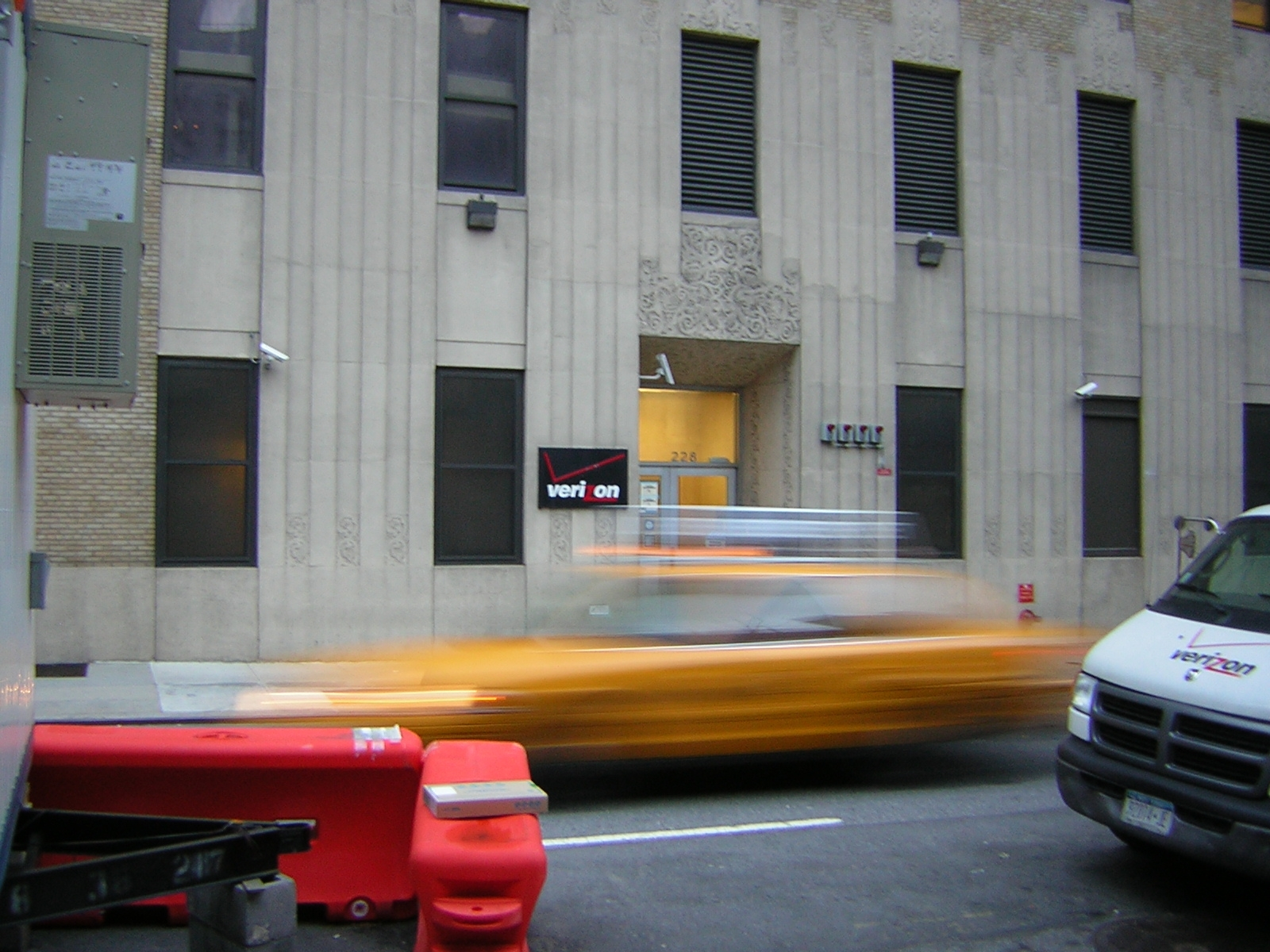
Typical central office at 228 East 56th Street

The company's infrastructure expanded underground in the 1920s, creating expensive new outside plant that fixed its geometry for the century to come. New cable ducts brought more reliable service to customers. They converged at approximately twenty wire centers, which were connected by trunk cables running along the East and West Sides of Manhattan. The locations were one to two miles apart, close to concentrations of office workers while avoiding high prices for land. At each wire center a new central office building arose to house telephone switchboards, panel switches and other inside plant, along with technicians, clerks, operators, and other workers. The largest of these was also the corporate headquarters, at 140 West Street on the Lower West Side, about a half mile from AT&T headquarters at 195 Broadway.

The Manhattan and Bronx parts of the underground system are owned by the Empire City Subway Company subsidiary. Similar construction, on a smaller scale, went on in Brooklyn, Buffalo and other urban areas. Suburban and rural service also expanded, mostly with aerial cable or open wire plant and Strowger switches.

== Service crisis ==
Forecasters in the late 1960s underestimated demand, resulting in a shortage of capacity in Manhattan, NYTel's principal profit area. Customers had to wait weeks for a new line or a repair, and sometimes minutes for dial tone on an existing line. The new 1ESS Stored Program Control exchanges had software bugs that kept them from carrying full load. Deferred maintenance choked main distribution frames (MDFs) with dead jumpers. There were not enough cables to office buildings, nor enough underground conduits to install them. Morale was poor in all levels and departments, and strikes were frequent.

The company's response was to hire and train thousands of new employees and to purchase new equipment on which they could work. Underground construction took years, but emergency installation of Anaconda Carrier pair gain systems normally used in rural areas expanded service while construction was in progress. Bell Labs added processing power to their new systems and fixed the software bugs. A new wire center at 1095 Avenue of the Americas and 42nd Street relieved four others in Midtown Manhattan of part of their load, as well as providing the company with a new headquarters for the next several decades. The crisis subsided during the 1970s, decreasing the number of workers needed to facilitate the development of the industry.

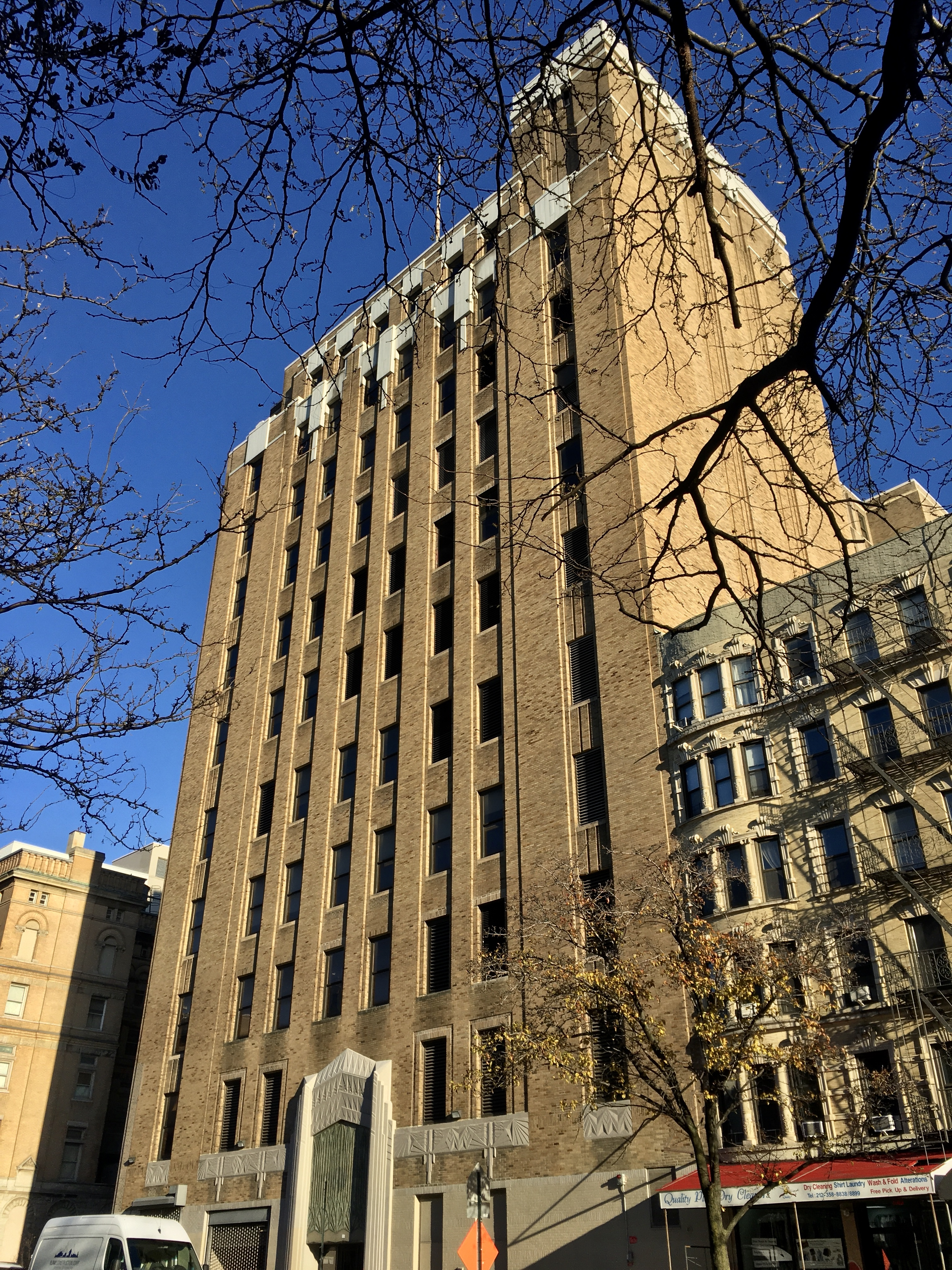
Second Avenue exchange building

On February 27, 1975, a fire in the telephone building at 204 Second Avenue and East 13th Street destroyed the MDF, disconnecting tens of thousands of customers, and obsolescent switching equipment was destroyed or damaged by smoke. Located at the south end of the East Side trunk cable duct under Second Avenue, this building connects many circuits to Brooklyn which were disrupted. A Bell System mobilization dealt with the crisis, including replacing the destroyed MDF. An obsolete and recently retired exchange at the West 18th Street office, not yet melted down for scrap metal, was temporarily resurrected to serve thousands of E13 customers though existing crosstown cables. The damaged Number One Crossbar Switching System (1XB switch) was cleaned, and a Number One Electronic Switching System (1ESS switch) that had been destined for the 104 Broad Street exchange was diverted. This was the largest loss of telephone service from fire in United States history until the September 11 attacks.

== Montmartre phone book listing ==
In 1977–1979, New York Telephone got (sometimes mocking) news coverage for trying to remove a long phone book listing for "Montmartre Govt Of" from the government blue pages. Theater promoter Barry Alan Richmond, who had paid for that listing, appealed to the New York Public Service Commission and two courts, finally announcing a PSC ruling in his favor after two years of this dispute.

== Wholly owned subsidiary ==
New York Telephone was an AT&T subsidiary until the AT&T breakup effective January 1, 1984. At that time, New York Telephone, along with the New England Telephone & Telegraph Company, became part of a Regional Bell operating company named NYNEX. The company was referred to as "New York Telephone, a NYNEX Company" before being called simply "NYNEX" starting on January 1, 1994. On August 15, 1997, NYNEX was acquired by Bell Atlantic, who kept the Bell Atlantic name. On June 30, 2000, Bell Atlantic acquired GTE to form the current Verizon Communications, with the corporate headquarters remaining the same 1095 Avenue of the Americas location until 2006 when HQ returned to 140 West Street.

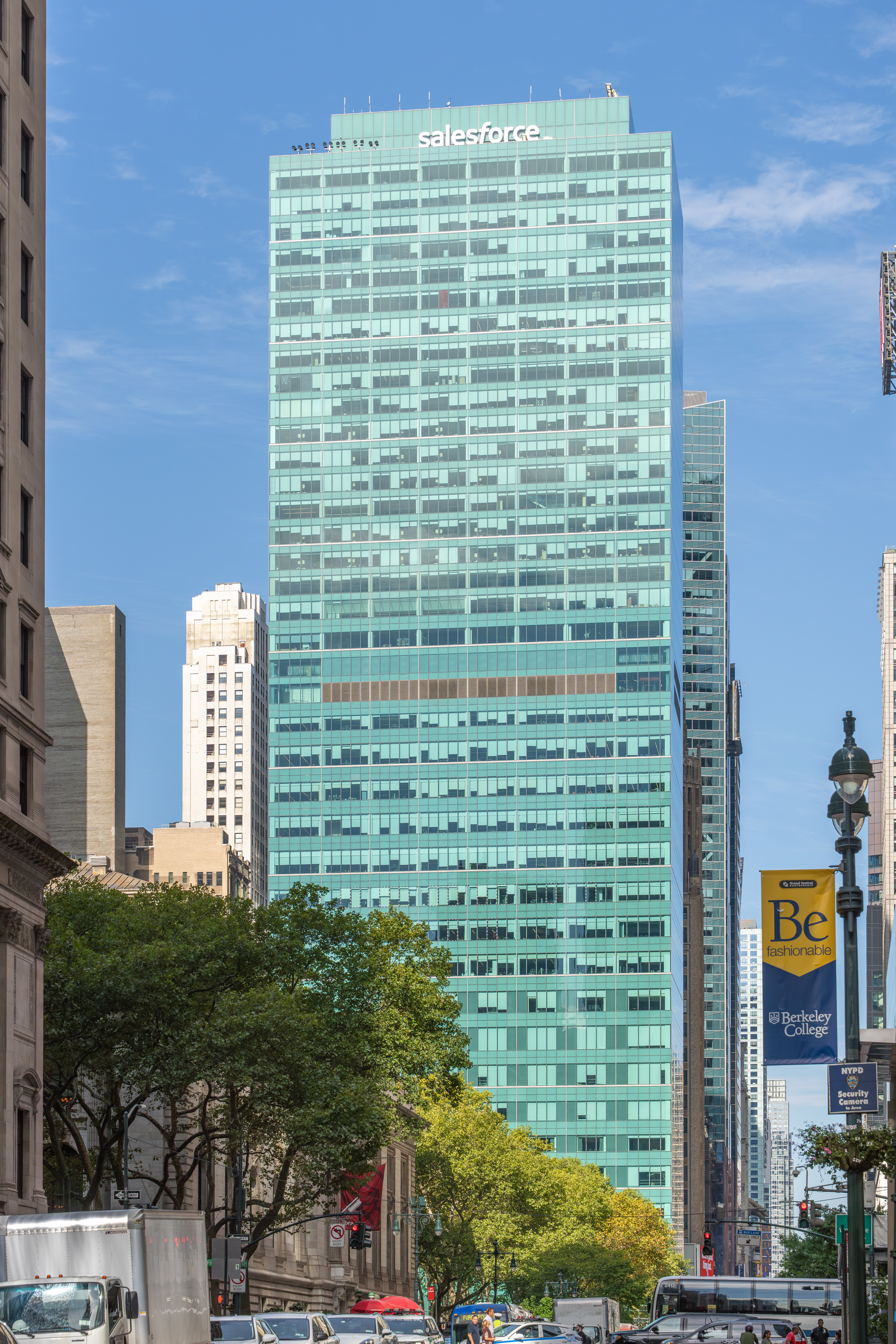
1095 Avenue of the Americas

New York Telephone provides local telephone service throughout the state of New York, with the exception of the areas served by the Rochester Telephone Company and other smaller independent local exchange companies. The company also serves the Greenwich and Byram exchanges in Connecticut. The rest of Connecticut is served by SNET, which historically owned by AT&T and then Frontier has been owned by Verizon since January 2026 when Verizon acquired Frontier.

New York Telephone, then operating under the Bell Atlantic brand, was the first Bell telephone company to win approval to provide long-distance service within its operating territory in December 1999, following the Telecommunications Act of 1996.

== 21st century ==
The September 11, 2001, attacks destroyed the small telephone exchange inside the World Trade Center, that served the center, and damaged the company's largest exchange building, the Verizon Building at 140 West Street, across Vesey Street. The destruction included cables under Vesey Street as well as inside plant damaged when I-beams and steel from the towers ran through the building. Service was disrupted to approximately 300,000 business and consumer voice circuits, 3,600,000 data circuits (including the New York Stock Exchange), and 10 cell towers.

Police Department headquarters lost telephone service, but the nearby NYTel building at 375 Pearl Street had its own small exchange which only lost part of its connections to the rest of the network. Madison Street was closed and cables run out the lower windows of the two buildings and along the pavement to bring immediate service to a few hundred police telephone lines.

Workers from throughout the country, including 3,000 Verizon employees plus non-Verizon employees, helped restore service, allowing the network to carry 230,000,000 calls during the first week following the attacks. During the restoration efforts, trunk cables were run out windows and down the side of the building, flowing through streets closed to traffic, until they found an undamaged manhole for them to enter. DMS-100 and other exchange equipment was damaged and replaced the following year. The building was completely renovated restoring it to its former glory as corporate headquarters. In a ceremony on December 8, 2005, Verizon moved its corporate headquarters from 1095 Avenue of the Americas to 140 West St.

Beginning in 2005, the company sold off parts of its buildings in Manhattan due to reductions in equipment requirements as customers switched from landlines to cell phones. Many of the properties were turned into residential condominiums, while others were turned into medical offices, hotel rooms, or office space; properties included 140 West Street, 212 West 18th Street (now known as the Walker Tower), 240 East 38th Street, 375 Pearl Street and 1095 Avenue of the Americas. Verizon later returned its headquarters to 1095 Avenue of the Americas.
