= 1095 Avenue of the Americas =

Office skyscraper in Manhattan, New York

1095 Avenue of the Americas 3 Bryant Park
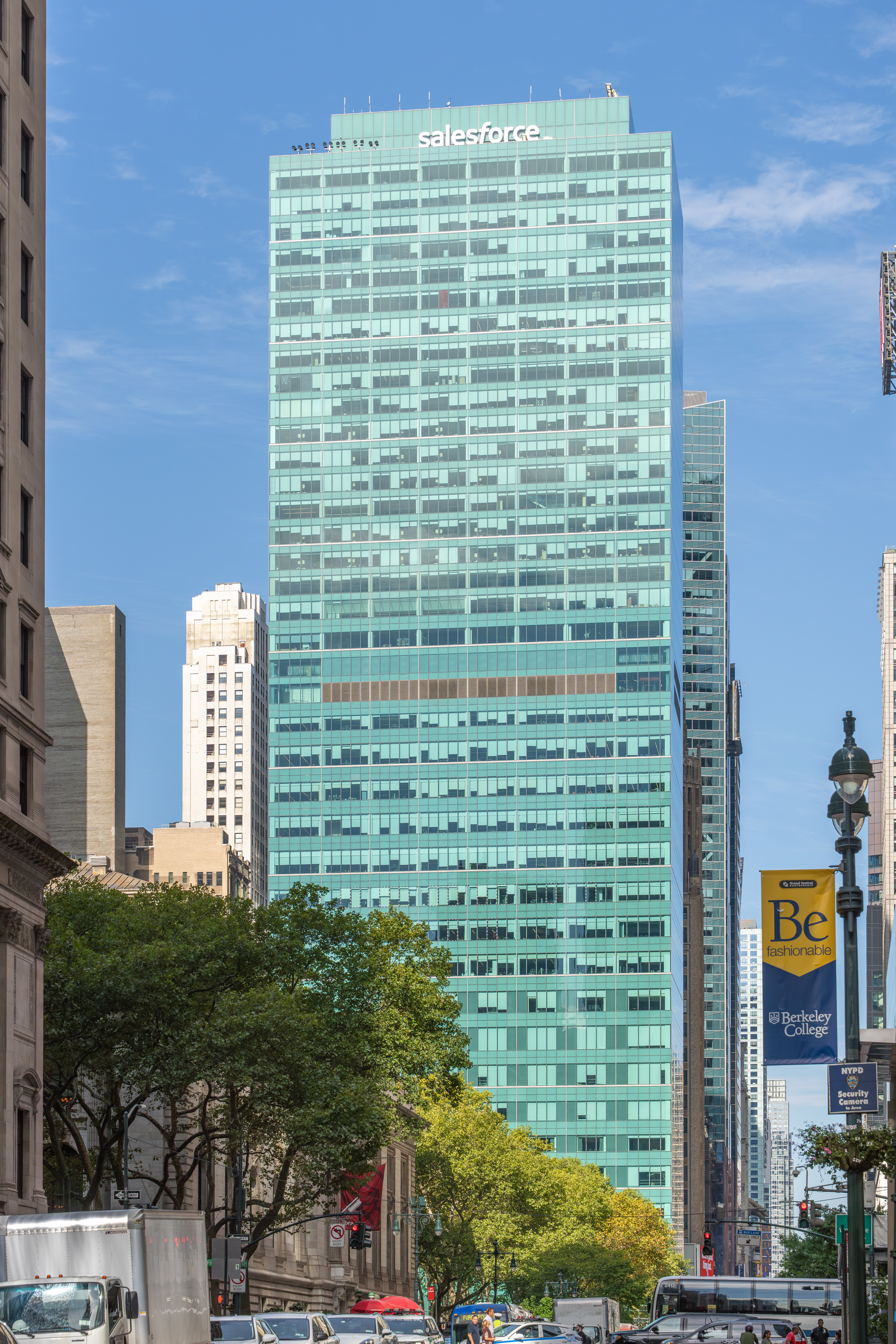
- (2025)

General information
- Type: Office
- Location: Midtown Manhattan, New York City
- Coordinates: 40.754621°N 73.984702°W
- Construction started: 1971
- Completed: 1973
- Owner: Ivanhoé Cambridge, Real Summit Investment

Height
- Roof: 630 ft (190 m)

Technical details
- Floor count: 41
- Floor area: 1,300,000 sq ft (120,000 m^{2})

Design and construction
- Architect: Kahn & Jacobs

1095 Avenue of the Americas is a 630-foot-tall (190 m) skyscraper in the Midtown Manhattan neighborhood of New York City. It was constructed from 1971 to 1973 to be the headquarters of the New York Telephone Company and has 41 floors. The building also served as the headquarters of NYNEX and Bell Atlantic. Kahn & Jacobs designed the tower, which is the 98th tallest building in the city. The original facade was said to be designed to resemble the relays which were commonly found inside telephones of the time.

== History ==
From 2006 to 2007, the tower was upgraded from Class B+ to Class A office space for $260 million. The phone company moved its headquarters to 140 West Street in the early 2000s and sold off most of the Sixth Avenue building. Verizon retained a condominium interest in floors 6-12, where it maintained offices and a telephone exchange serving landlines in Midtown Manhattan. In 2013, the company moved its corporate headquarters back to 1095 Avenue of the Americas after selling the upper floors of the Verizon Building.

In 2015, Ivanhoé Cambridge and Callahan Capital Properties purchased 1095 Avenue of the Americas from The Blackstone Group for $2.2 billion, the most expensive transaction involving a single office building in New York City since 2008. In August 2016, Real Summit Investment, a real estate investment subsidiary of the Hong Kong Monetary Authority's Exchange Fund, paid $1.15 billion for a 49% stake in the building.

== Tenants ==
In addition to Verizon, other major tenants as of late 2008 include insurance giant MetLife (whose name is outside above the entryway), law firm Dechert LLP, iStar Financial, Lloyds Banking Group, Instinet, Standard Chartered USA, and Stifel. In 2013, Whole Foods Market finalized a deal to open a 32,000-square-foot (3,000 m^{2}) flagship location spread across the first and second floors of the building. The market opened its doors in January 2017. Pandora Jewelry, Tourneau, and Equinox Fitness also operate in the base of the building. ASICS abruptly vacated its 5,000-square-foot (460 m^{2}) space in October 2015 amid a legal battle with the company's retail operator, less than a year after moving in.

In 2016, Salesforce signed a deal to rename the building Salesforce Tower, and the San Francisco-based company plans to eventually occupy 5 floors. The first Salesforce employees in New York City to move to the new office arrived on Monday November 14, 2016. U.S. Bancorp signed a lease for 68,000 square feet (6,300 m^{2}) in September 2016 and Apollo Global Management followed in July 2017 with a 70,000 square feet (6,500 m^{2}) lease. Lloyds Bank leased approximately 35,000 square feet (3,300 m^{2}) in January 2019, bringing the building to 96% occupancy.
