= Barclay–Vesey Building =

Building in Manhattan, New York

- Barclay–Vesey Building; New York Telephone Co. Building
- U.S. National Register of Historic Places
- New York State Register of Historic Places
- New York City Landmark
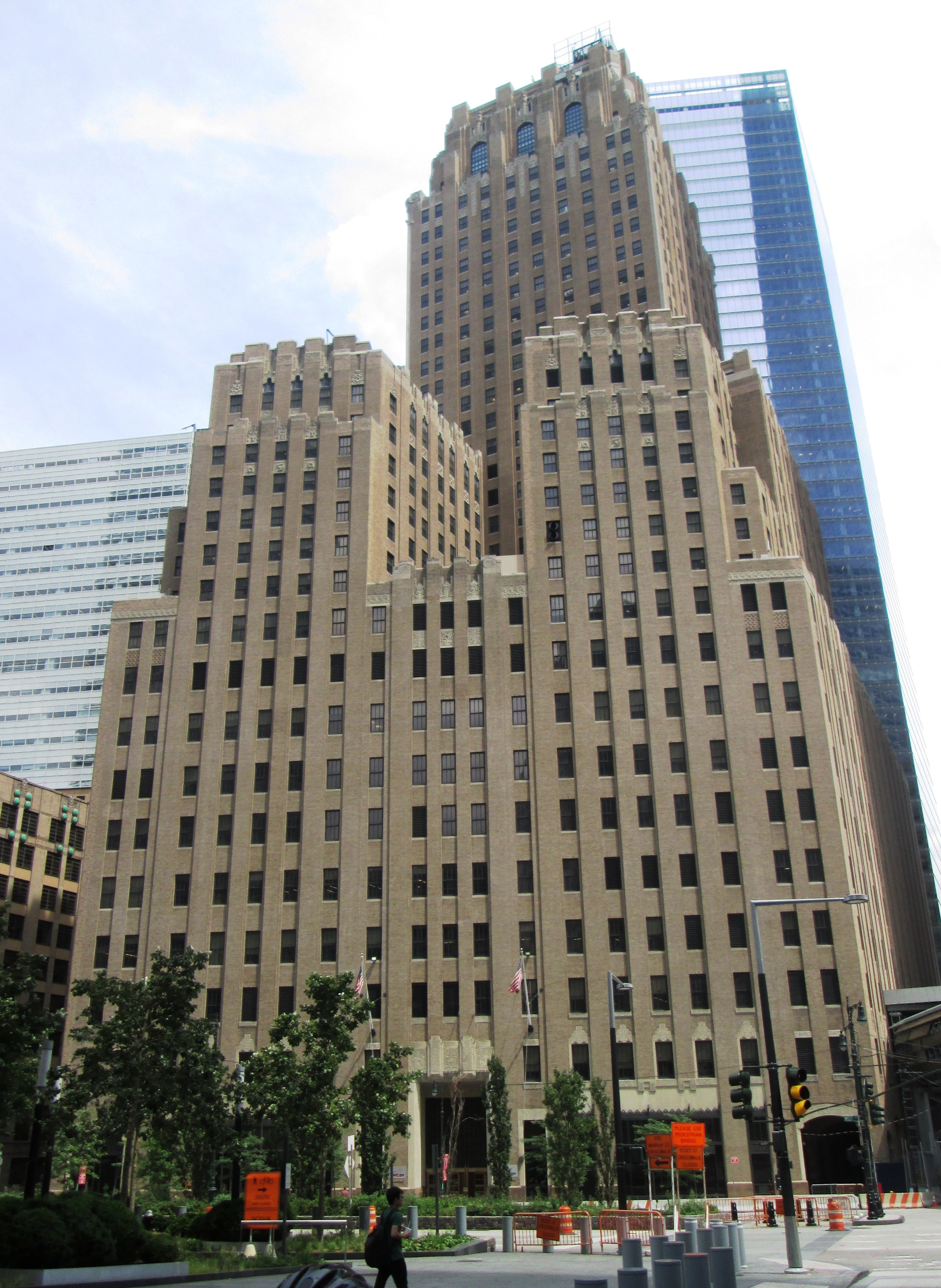
- Western facade in 2013
- Location: 140 West Street; Manhattan, New York
- Coordinates: 40°42′50″N 74°00′47″W
- Area: 52,000 ft^{2} (4,800 m^{2})
- Built: 1923–1927
- Architect: Ralph Walker
- Architectural style: Art Deco
- NRHP reference No.: 09000257
- NYSRHP No.: 06101.001324
- NYCL No.: 1745, 1746

Significant dates
- Added to NRHP: April 30, 2009
- Designated NYSRHP: March 16, 2009
- Designated NYCL: October 1, 1991

The Barclay–Vesey Building (also known as 100 Barclay, the Verizon Building, and formerly the New York Telephone Company Building) is an office and residential building at 140 West Street in Lower Manhattan, New York City. The 32-story building was designed in the Art Deco style by Ralph Walker of Voorhees, Gmelin and Walker, and was Walker's first major commission as well as one of the first Art Deco skyscrapers. It occupies the entire block bounded by West Street to the west, Barclay Street to the north, Vesey Street to the south, and Washington Street to the east, abutting the World Trade Center.

The building was constructed from 1923 to 1927 and was the longtime corporate headquarters of New York Telephone and its successor Verizon Communications. The building, being adjacent to the original World Trade Center to the south and 7 World Trade Center to the east, experienced major damage in the September 11 attacks following the collapse of the World Trade Center. Restoration of the building and damaged communications infrastructure after the attacks took three years and cost $1.4 billion. In 2016, part of the building was converted into 100 Barclay, a residential condominium development.

The Barclay–Vesey Building's architects intended for the structure to have an imposing form, with vertical piers designed as buttresses; setbacks at upper floors; and a program of elaborate ornamentation on the exterior and interior. The Barclay–Vesey Building's design has been widely praised by architectural critics, both for its design scheme and for its symbolism. The building's exterior and first-floor interior were declared city landmarks by the New York City Landmarks Preservation Commission in 1991, and the building was added to the National Register of Historic Places in 2009.

== Site ==
The Barclay–Vesey Building is on the border of Lower Manhattan's Financial District and Tribeca neighborhoods. It occupies an entire city block bounded by West Street to the west, Vesey Street and the World Trade Center to the south, Washington Street to the east, and Barclay Street to the north. Adjacent buildings include 7 World Trade Center to the east and One World Trade Center to the south. The block is parallelogram-shaped, measuring about 210 feet (64 m) along West and Washington Streets and 250 feet (76 m) along Vesey and Barclay Streets. (Note: Walker 1926b, p. 413 gives the block's dimensions as being 212 by 255 feet (65 by 78 m).) The total area of the block is 52,000 square feet (4,800 m^{2}).

Prior to the 19th century, the Barclay–Vesey Building's site was located off the shore of the North River (now Hudson River). The shore from Vesey Street north to King Street was infilled during the mid-19th century, and docks were constructed west of West Street. A wholesale market called the Washington Market was established on the future Barclay–Vesey Building block in 1812 or 1813. To support the market and the nearby food businesses, about 35 three- to five-story brick structures were erected on the block. In addition, there was a lighthouse on the site. When the building was erected, the site was still on the shoreline of the Hudson River. In the 1970s, Battery Park City was built on filled land along the shore, severing the building from the waterfront.

== Architecture ==
The Barclay–Vesey Building, later known as the Verizon Building, was designed by Ralph Thomas Walker in the Art Deco style. It measures 498 feet (152 m) tall (Note: Architecture and Building 1926, p. 111, gives a slightly different figure of 486 feet (148 m). The Wall Street Journal 1925 gives a figure of 484 ft (148 m).) and contains 32 stories, with mezzanines above the ground, 17th, and 31st stories. The Art Deco style was not yet established when the building was erected, and contemporary publications described the building as being "Modernistic" or "Modern Perpendicular". Consequently, some architectural critics describe the Barclay–Vesey Building as being the first Art Deco skyscraper. It was also the first major structure that Walker designed for McKenzie, Voorhees & Gmelin, (Note: The firm was renamed Voorhees, Gmelin & Walker during the building's construction.) and, as such, was aesthetically distinguished from the firm's previous commissions. The building was constructed by general contractor Marc Eidlitz & Son, with several consulting engineers assisting in the project.

Walker intended the building to be "as modern as the telephone activity it houses". His design took several elements from Eliel Saarinen's proposal for Chicago's Tribune Tower, as well as from Walker's own entry in the design competition for the Tribune Tower. Such elements included the Barclay–Vesey Building's setbacks; its vertical piers; and its pyramidal roof, which had been a defining feature of Walker's Tribune Tower proposal. The Barclay–Vesey Building's architecture has been compared to San Antonio's Milam Building, the largest pre-stressed concrete and brick office building and the first to have an integrated designed-in air conditioning system. Walker subsequently designed other Art Deco buildings in the New York City area, such as the New Jersey Bell Headquarters Building (1929), 60 Hudson Street (1930), 101 Willoughby Street and 1 Wall Street (1931), and 32 Avenue of the Americas (1932), as well as telephone buildings in Upstate New York.

=== Form ===
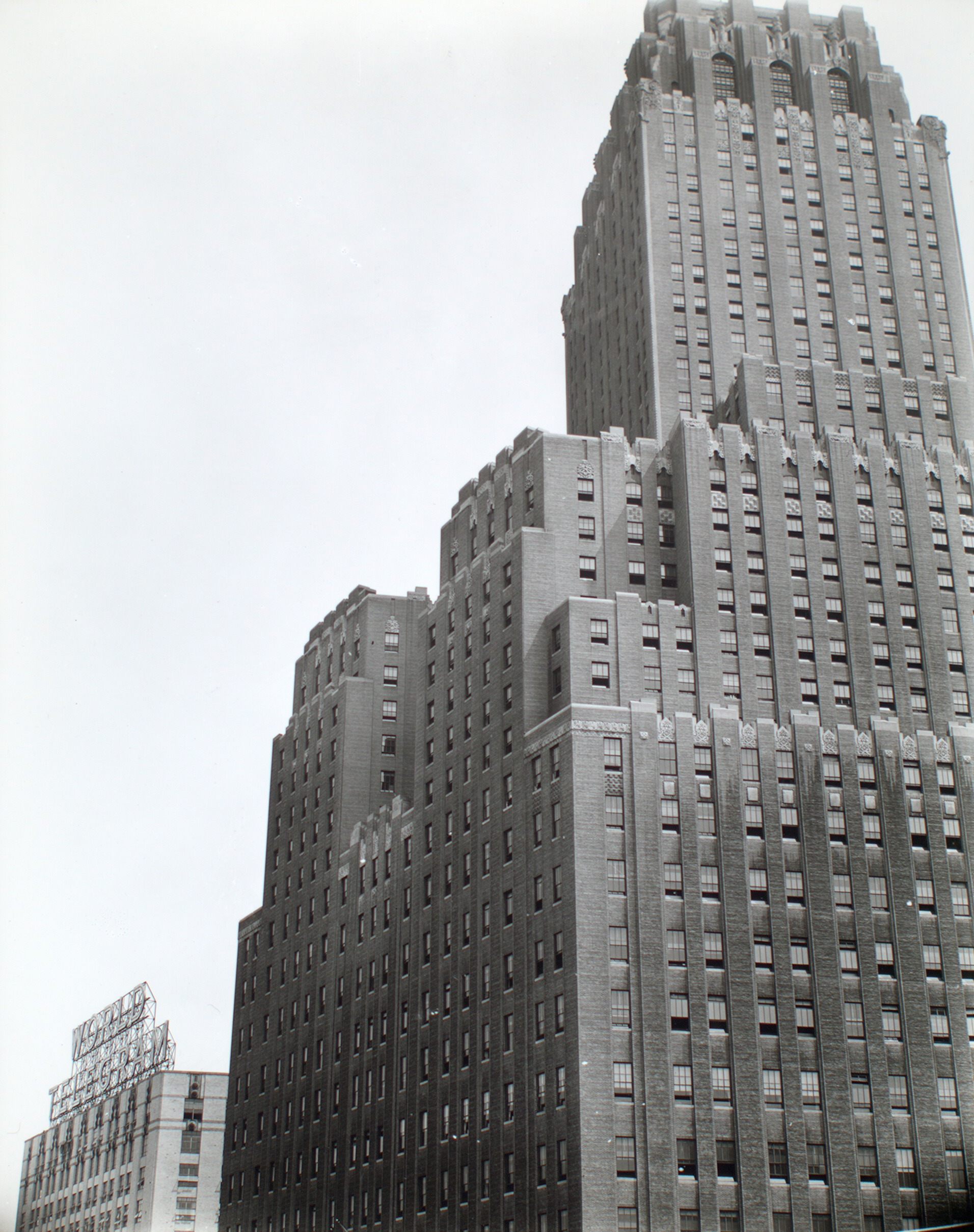
Berenice Abbott image of the Barclay–Vesey Building, 1936

The massing of the Barclay–Vesey Building includes numerous setbacks. Though setbacks in New York City skyscrapers were mandated by the 1916 Zoning Resolution to allow light and air to reach the streets below, they later became a defining feature of the Art Deco style. The lowest ten floors of the building occupy the entire area of the city block. Above the 10th floor, there are setbacks on the north and south elevations of the facade. Narrow and deep light courts, to the west and east, create an H-shaped floor plan from the 11th to the 17th floors. There are smaller setbacks at each corner on the 13th floor. The building rises as a 108-by-116-foot (33 by 35 m) tower above the 17th floor, though smaller wings flank the northern and southern elevations on the 18th and 19th floors. The rectangular tower is aligned with buildings on Broadway to the east, so it is parallel to Barclay and Vesey Streets.

During the design process, Walker had considered plans for "a series of stacked blocks connected by blunt transitions", though this proposal lacked a unified sense of character. The appearance of unity was ultimately attained through the inclusion of piers on the facade. These piers divide the facade into bays. The western and eastern elevations of the Barclay–Vesey Building's facade are 19 bays wide, while the northern and southern elevations contain 23 bays each.

The Barclay–Vesey Building's form was also influenced by its interior use. There were numerous functions that did not necessitate sunlight and could operate using artificial light, such as the central operating system and the mechanical space, which was placed inside the building's core. The mechanical core was an important consideration since, at the time, office buildings largely relied on natural ventilation through means such as light courts. Because the office space was placed on the exterior walls, the lowest ten stories did not need light courts. As a result, the base could also occupy the entire lot area, with higher setbacks than in other office buildings.

=== Facade ===
The facade was inspired by Maya architecture. Above the granite base, the exterior is clad with brick in hues of green, gold, and buff, a material that Walker preferred for its texture and color. There is cast-stone ornamentation on the building's upper floors, as well as patterned motifs and limestone decoration on the lower floors. The builders used machines to create as many of the decorative features as possible. The Barclay–Vesey Building also contains serrated stone-and-light-brick parapets, which, when combined with the building's vertical piers, give a naturalistic "alpine" look to the setbacks. When taken as a whole, the materials of the facade were intended to give an impression of stability and mass.

The facade also serves a protective purpose: the steel frame is enclosed within 12-inch-thick (30 cm), heavy masonry in the exterior infill walls. This was composed of 4 inches (100 mm) of face brick and 8 inches (200 mm) of terracotta, laid in Portland cement mortar with a waterproofing compound. Face brick on terracotta was used because it was cheaper than solid brick. The windows had wire-glass panes and hollow steel frames for fireproofing. The modern-day facade contains some Indiana limestone slabs measuring 5 to 6 inches (130 to 150 mm) thick; these were installed after the building was damaged during the September 11 attacks in 2001. Thicker limestone panels, measuring 16 inches (410 mm) thick, were installed around the main entrance.

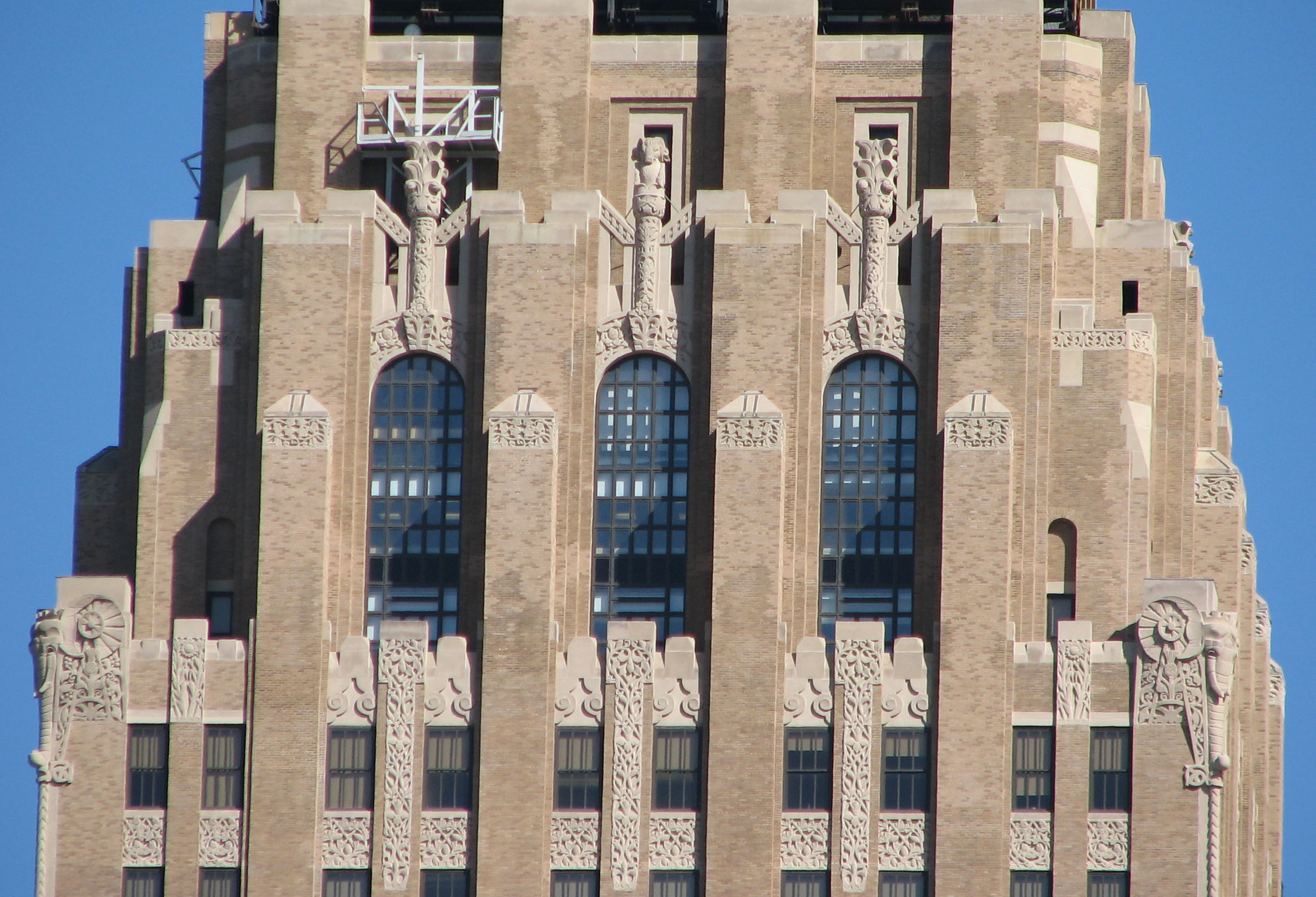
Top floors

The ornamentation on the facade was carried out by Ulysses Ricci and John De Cesare. Walker wanted the ornamentation to attract passersby and to temper the building's large mass. For the Barclay–Vesey Building, Walker eschewed traditional motifs, such as egg-and-dart patterns, which he saw as cliched. He wrote that the decorative elements should be "so complicated in its structure as not to be readily comprehended; its framework should be as hidden as the steel structure itself." It includes complex foliage; babies and animal heads; and a bell above the door, symbolizing the telephone company. The bell was the only decoration on the facade that indicated the building's original use as a telecommunications center. Though Walker characterized the ornamental program as "free and flowing", it was actually rigid and complex. Architectural critic Lewis Mumford stated that the ornamental program at ground level was an extensive "rock garden".

==== Ground story ====
The main facades are on West and Washington Streets to the west and east, respectively. At the center of each side, there are large entrance portals that are three bays wide and two stories tall. These portals contain bronze-framed doorways with decorative motifs. Above the doors are bronze screens with vine-and-grape ornamentation; these formerly also contained motifs of bells to represent the New York Telephone Company. The main entrance portals are framed with a decorative limestone lintel depicting a bird and human figures. The limestone friezes above each set of doors depict a bell flanked by a Mongolian and a Native American, which respectively symbolize the Eastern world and the Western world. On the West Street facade, the main entrance portal is flanked on either side by two single-width double-height bays, a triple-width double-height bay, and another single-width double-height bay. These double-height bays contain storefronts. From top to bottom, the storefronts at the base are generally composed of a solid panel, glazed glass, and a decorative transom.

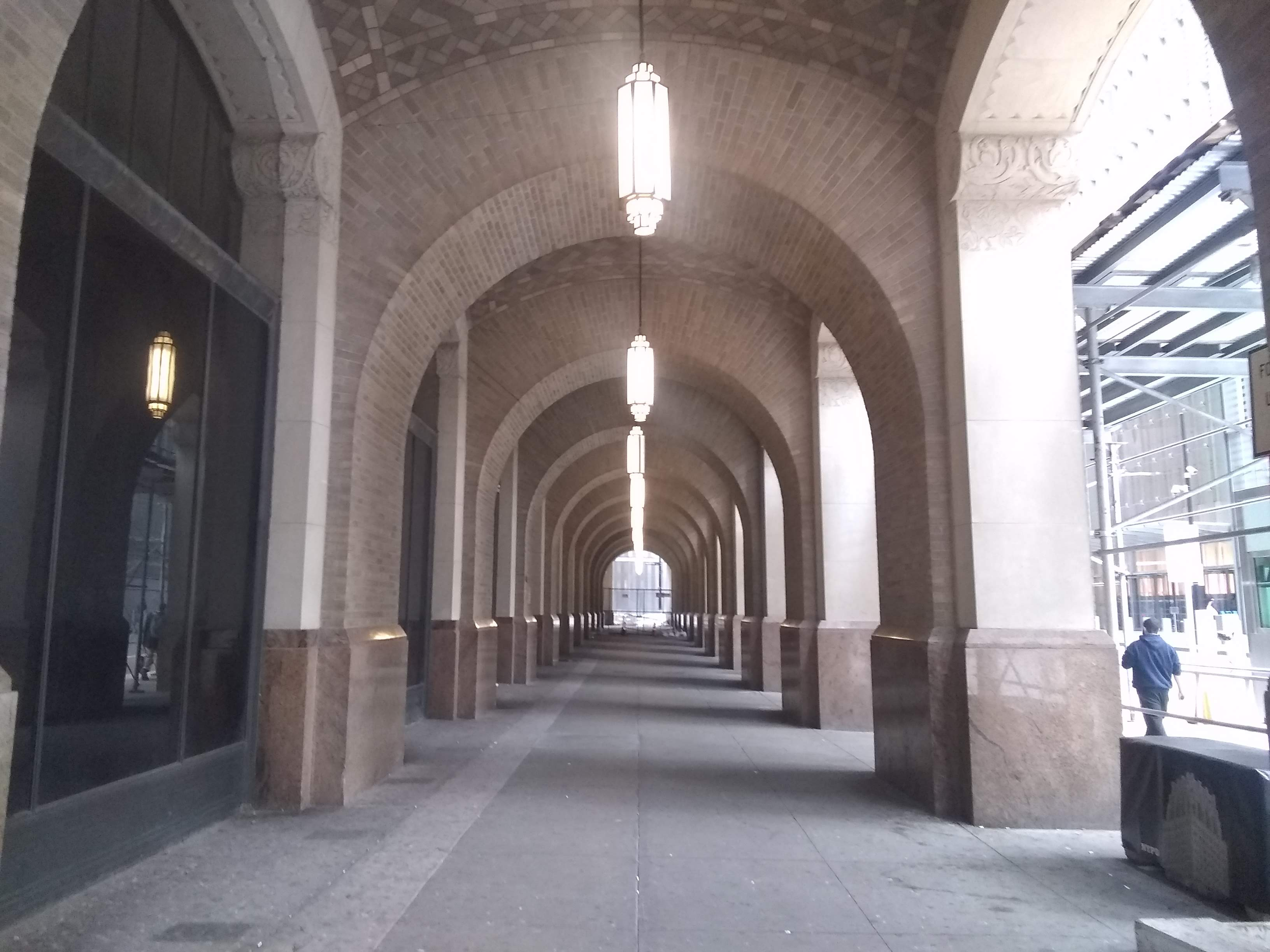
The ground-level arcade

There is an enclosed, arched arcade above the Vesey Street sidewalk on the southern facade, measuring approximately 17 feet (5.2 m) wide and 250 feet (76 m) long. (Note: Architecture and Building 1926, p. 111, cites the arcade as being 250 feet (76 m) long, 17 feet (5.2 m) wide, and 18 feet (5.5 m) tall. Landmarks Preservation Commission 1991, p. 16, and National Park Service 2009, p. 19, cite the arcade as being 252 feet (77 m) long, 16 feet (4.9 m) wide, and 19 feet (5.8 m) tall.) There are 12 arches in total; each corresponds to two window bays above, except the westernmost arch, which corresponds to one window bay. The arches are supported by brick piers while the ceilings are composed of Guastavino tiles. The arcade was a compromise design because the city wanted to expand the street during the building's construction, while Walker wanted a larger base. The arcade was called "one of the most comfortable shopping fronts in New York City" when the Barclay–Vesey Building was completed, but because it was so dark, the arcade did not receive too much pedestrian traffic. Nevertheless, numerous enterprises were located in the arcade, including a circulating library. The Vesey Street storefronts were converted to office space by the 2000s.

The north facade also contains storefronts set within double-width, double-height arches. Two of the central arches were converted into rectangular garage openings.

==== Upper stories ====
On the second through 32nd stories, the window design is mostly consistent. Most window openings contain three-over-three sash windows, though some openings have been covered with louvered grates, especially in places where there are mechanical or communications equipment. The second-story windows are generally topped by elaborate triangular limestone surrounds that contain carvings of birds, grapes, and vines, except at the corners of the building, where the second-story windows contain lintels and sills with carvings of grapes and vines. The third-story windows also contain sills with grape and vine carvings. The fourth- through 32nd-story windows have plain, undecorated sills and windows. Each window bay is separated by vertical limestone piers.

Cast stone decorative elements are concentrated above the 20th story. For example, at the 29th story, the corner piers contain elephant heads with geometrically shaped ears and trunks. The 30th floor, 31st floor, and 31st-floor mezzanine contains five triple-height arched windows on each facade. Stone piers protrude above the rooftop level, which contains some mechanical equipment.

=== Features ===
==== Structural features ====
The building's basements extend 72 feet (22 m) deep and are surrounded by a concrete cofferdam measuring 8 feet (2.4 m) thick. The cofferdam encloses steel braces that descend to 65 feet (20 m) below the curb. Above ground, there is masonry encasing the steel superstructure. Brick, cinder, concrete, and other masonry materials are used throughout the interior. The floors are made of reinforced concrete, and wood was avoided in the building where possible, with steel doors used for fireproofing. The stairs and corridors were also designed to be fire- and smoke-proof, with partitions throughout the building. Some 5,000 short tons (4,500 long tons; 4,500 t) of steel was used in the substructure, while 15,000 short tons (13,000 long tons; 14,000 t) of steel was used in the superstructure.

==== Mechanical features ====
The building was split mechanically into two sections: one serving the basements and lowest 16 floors, and another serving the 18th through 32nd floors. The 17th floor housed the mechanical equipment. This was in contrast to other buildings, where mechanical equipment were usually contained on their roofs or in their basements. The floors could handle live structural loads of up to 150 or 275 pounds per square foot (730 or 1,340 kg/m^{2}), depending on the intended uses of each floor section. The Barclay–Vesey Building was equipped with electric ducts on every floor, so a wire could be brought to within 2 or 3 feet (0.61 or 0.91 m) of any point in the building. Two 110-to-220-volt direct current power lines provided power for the building's normal operation, though either line could provide all of the building's power if the other line failed. In addition, there were two 13,400-volt, three-phase alternating current lines for the telephone exchanges. There were also 35 motor generators with a total capacity of 2,000 horsepower (1,500 kW).

Heating and ventilation systems were also divided into three sections: the basements to the 10th story, the 11th to 17th stories, and the 18th to 32nd stories. Air distribution to each section was controlled by a panel in the fourth basement, which operated pneumatic valves in the 10th story and 17th mezzanine. The heat was provided by four boilers, which were powered by coal bunkers with a capacity of 1,500 short tons (1,300 long tons; 1,400 t). The heat was then distributed to the upper stories through 3,000 radiators. Within the lobby, two recirculating systems were installed, taking hot air from the ceiling and discharging it into the floor. The restrooms had their own ventilation shaft, discharging air at the roof. There was also an ice-making plant in the basement, which could create 2,000 pounds (910 kg) of ice every 24 hours.

The building's water-supply system is divided into three sections. The basements and ground story were served directly by the New York City water supply system. The second through 16th stories were supplied by a 33,500-U.S.-gallon (127,000 L) tank on the 17th-story mezzanine. The 18th through 32nd stories were supplied by a 15,000-U.S.-gallon (57,000 L) tank on the 32nd story. The tanks on the 17th mezzanine and 32nd story were each served exclusively by two pumps, and a fifth pump could serve either tank. Hot water was provided by heaters on the first basement, the fourth story, and the 17th mezzanine. The original fire-protection system had tanks with a total capacity of 62,500 U.S. gallons (237,000 L; 52,000 imp gal), with a large tank on the roof and smaller reserve tanks on the eighth, 17th mezzanine, and 25th floors. The fourth basement had two motor-driven 250-horsepower (190 kW) pumps, which could provide 2,000 U.S. gallons (7,600 L) of water per minute.

The building's drainage system was divided into several sections. In the basements and the first story, the sanitary system discharged into ejectors in the fifth basement. On and above the second story, there were two main sanitary stacks serving alternate floors. The roof had a separate drainage system that connected directly to the city's sewer system. Subsoil water and floor drains emptied into a 70,000-U.S.-gallon (260,000 L) sump in the fifth basement. From there, two sump pumps drained the water out of the building.

=== Interior ===
In his design for the Barclay–Vesey Building, Walker believed that the structure should serve "as a machine which had definite functions to perform for the benefit of its occupants." The design scheme for the interior is a continuation of that on the facade, which was a relatively rare stylistic choice of the time, since many contemporary buildings were being designed with modern-styled exteriors and historically styled interiors. Walker created the interior elements by machine when it was possible. Mumford likened this continuity in interior and exterior design to the works of Frank Lloyd Wright, Henry Hobson Richardson, and Louis Sullivan, which also exhibited such consistency. The interior space covers 1.2 million sq ft (110,000 m^{2}). When used as a telephone facility, the Barclay–Vesey Building could accommodate 6,000 workers in 850,000 square feet (79,000 m^{2}) of usable space.

There are 26 elevators to transport tenants to upper floors. The second through 16th floors are served by two elevator lobbies, while the 18th through 32nd floors are served by a single elevator lobby. When the building opened, there were four banks of passenger elevators with 24 cabs between them. Elevator banks A and B each had four cabs and served the lowest ten floors. They were manually operated, running at 700 feet per minute (210 m/min). Elevator bank C had eight cabs: two of these served all stories from the deepest basement to the 30th floor, while the others skipped all stories between the lobby and the 10th floor. Elevator bank D also had eight cabs, which skipped all stories between the lobby and the 16th floor. The two larger banks of elevators were fully automatic and could travel at up to 800 feet per minute (240 m/min). In addition, there was a service elevator, a "low-speed" freight elevator, and an observation cab running from the 30th floor to the roof. During the morning peak, the elevator system was designed to receive 180 persons per minute, with cabs departing the lobby every five seconds.

==== Lobby ====
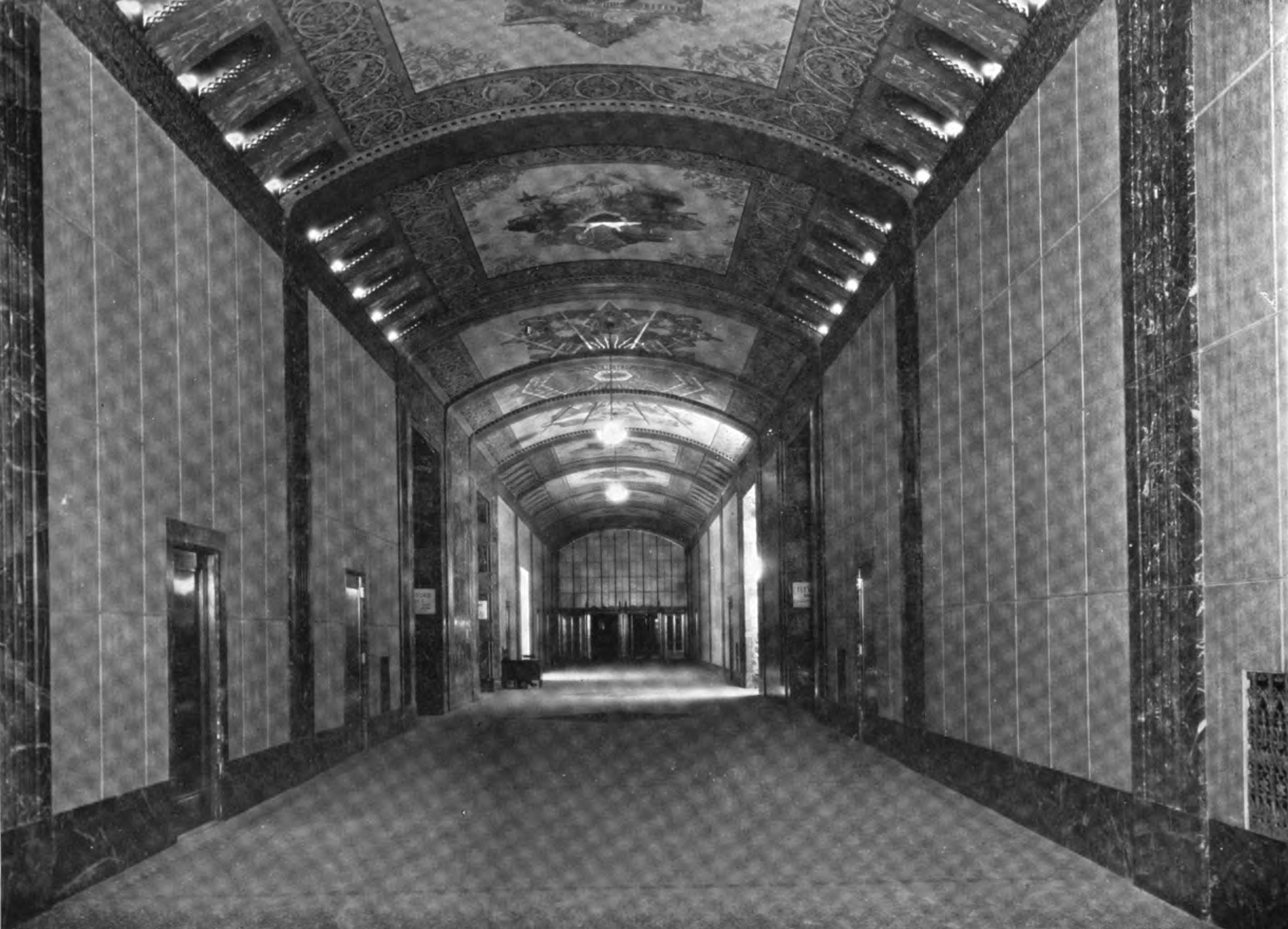
1926 image of the lobby

The lobby runs between the West and Washington Street entrances to the west and east, with a vaulted ceiling. (Note: Architecture and Building 1926, p. 110, cites the ceiling as being 25 feet (7.6 m) high. Landmarks Preservation Commission Interior 1991, p. 7, and National Park Service 2009, p. 7, cite the ceiling as being 22 feet (6.7 m) high.) The interior of the lobby includes buff-colored veined marble walls and floors. Travertine was used on the walls while Levanto marble was used for baseboards and trim. Toward the center of the lobby, there are two alcoves each on the north and south walls, which lead to the elevator banks. The northern alcoves both contain eight elevators while the southern alcoves both contain four elevators. All of the elevator alcoves contain painted ceilings and ornate bronze fixtures for ventilation and lights. The elevator doors were originally made of hammered iron, and the interiors of the elevator cabs had walnut panels. A telephone alcove is also placed off the lobby. Since the upper floors' residential overhaul in the 2010s, the western half of the lobby is still used by Verizon, but the eastern half is used as a residents' lounge.

The lobby has an Art Deco decorative scheme. These works were designed by Ricci and De Cesare, and executed by Edgar Williams and Mack, Jenney & Tyler. The elevator doors are framed by bronze surrounds, while the elevator lobbies feature Levanto marble walls. Other doorways leading from the lobby, as well as the fluted pilasters along the lobby's length, are also made of Levanto marble. The doors from the lobby are made of bronze, as are the capitals of the pilasters, which incorporate grape-and-vine motifs.

The lobby features inlaid bronze medallions in the floor, which depict the construction of the telephone system. The medallion on the eastern side depicts a female telephone operator, and that on the western side depicts a lineworker. There are twelve ceiling murals (Note: According to Walker 1926b, p. 404, there were ten murals.) that depict how human communication has progressed, from Aztec runners to the telephone. Nine murals (five at the western entrance and four at the eastern entrance) demonstrate the ancient methods of communication. The three center murals depict modern communication. Two bronze chandeliers with complex ornamentation hang from the ceiling. The chandeliers are suspended from motifs of "angelic figures".

==== Other floors ====
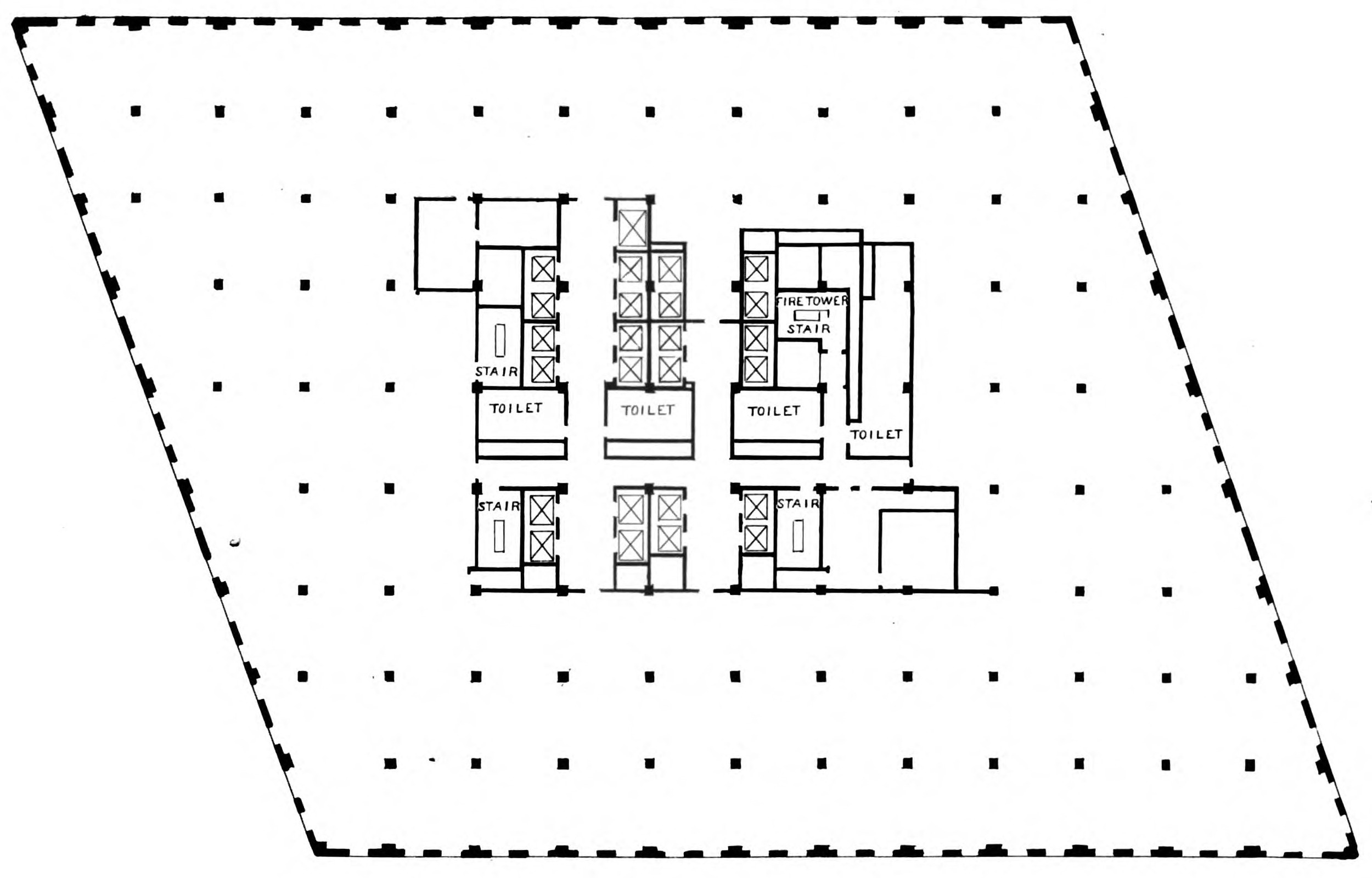
Floor plan of the 7th floor

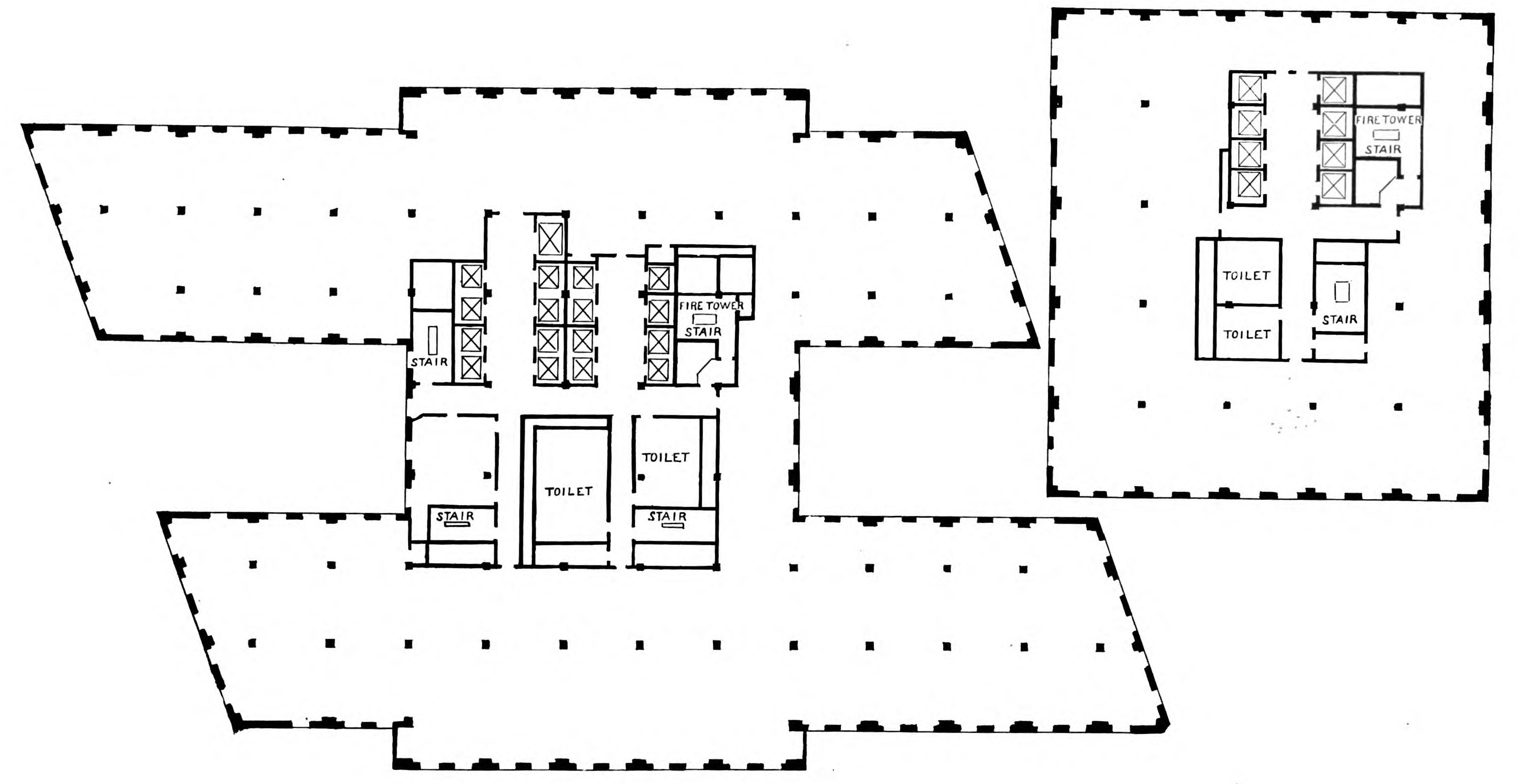
Floor plan of the 15th floor (left) and 28th floor (right)

The Barclay–Vesey Building has five sub-basement levels, which house communications equipment. Originally, four of the sub-basements had lead-covered cables and storage batteries with a 3,600-kilowatt-hour (13,000 MJ) capacity. At the time of the September 11 attacks, Verizon was using the building as a main telecommunications switching center in Lower Manhattan, handling approximately 200,000 phone lines and 3.6 million data circuits. These circuits traveled as far north as 42nd Street. In emergencies, the 17th floor could provide services to the building's base. As built, the structure had a cafeteria and recreation rooms within one of its basements. These spaces contained trees and paintings. A mural, depicting a panoramic view of the Mediterranean from Spain, decorated one wall.

When the building opened, it contained an auditorium at ground level and a gymnasium at the ground-floor mezzanine. The lowest ten floors above ground were intended for use as office space serving the central telephone offices. Each of these stories covered approximately 1 acre (0.40 ha). The upper stories' corridors generally had terrazzo floors, as well as 4.5-foot-high (1.4 m) Botticino marble wainscoting beneath buff-colored plaster walls. The elevator lobbies on each floor were equipped with illuminated signs, indicating which sets of elevators served that floor. The 29th floor included New York Telephone's offices. The 29th-story corridors and anteroom had travertine stone floors, Levanto marble baseboards, Kato stone wainscoting, and plaster friezes and ceilings. White oak floors and curly maple paneling were used in the suite itself. The 31st floor contained an assembly room that could hold 6,500 workers. There was also a training school for workers.

The stories above the 10th floor have been converted into 157 luxury condominium units. There is a separate lobby for residents on the Barclay Street side, which connects to the original lobby. The penthouse apartment, a duplex unit on the 31st and 32nd floors, covers 14,500 square feet (1,350 m^{2}) with a 96-by-33-foot (29 by 10 m) living room, advertised as the largest in the city. The building also contains an 330-square-foot (31 m^{2}) wading pool and an 82-foot-long (25 m) lap pool. Other features of the residential portion of the Barclay–Vesey Building include rooms for wine-tasting and billiards; music practice; a fitness center; a children's playroom; and a residents' lounge. There are also four residential terraces.

== History ==
=== Development ===
The New York Telephone Company began to grow rapidly after World War I. An internal review of the organizational structure found that its New York City operations were housed in multiple buildings across the city and were thus inefficient. The company's main office was at 15 Dey Street, which had not been enlarged since 1904 and could not house the company's 33,000 employees. The company's president from 1919 to 1924, Howard Ford Thurber, sought to centralize the company's operations into a single large headquarters to "satisfy the present demands and to reasonably anticipate future requirements". In the early 1920s, the New York Telephone Company started acquiring the entire block between West, Barclay, Washington, and Vesey Streets. The site was chosen "because real estate values in that vicinity were much lower" compared to the area around Broadway, being relatively isolated from the rest of the neighborhood. The company owned the entire block by 1923, by which it had spent $1.5 million on acquisitions.

==== Planning ====
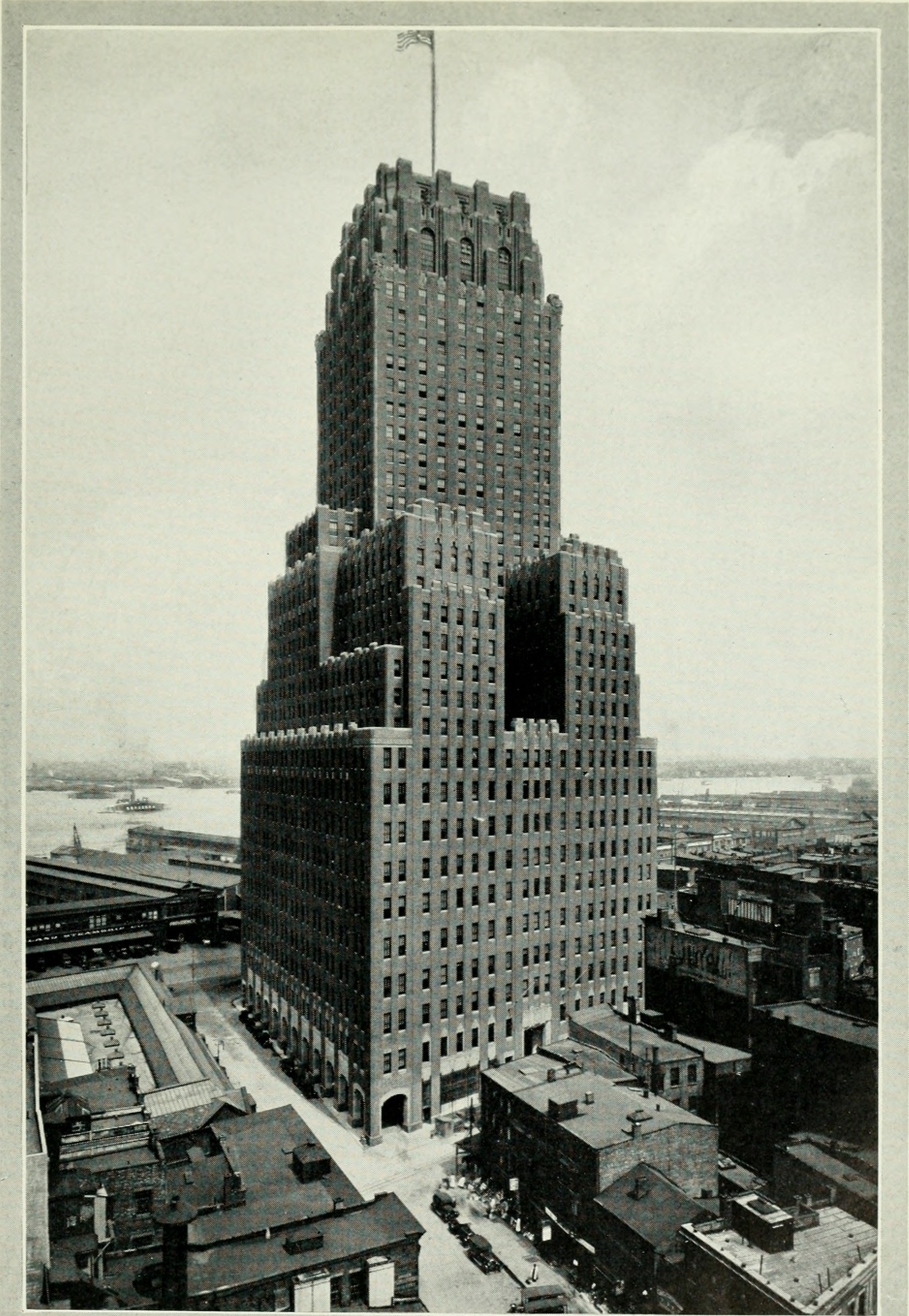
1920s image of the Barclay–Vesey Building, seen from east. The building was surrounded by food markets and the building was on the waterfront (background).

In April 1923, the company announced that it intended to build a new headquarters at a projected cost of $11.5 million. The structure was to house 6,000 employees from the company's six central offices, who would work with 120,000 telephones, as well as mechanical equipment to support the company's equipment. The initial design called for a height of 404 feet (123 m), with 680,000 square feet (63,000 m^{2}) of office space, and 38,000 square feet (3,500 m^{2}) of commercial ground-floor storefronts. In addition, the building would be erected with a steel-and-concrete frame, as well as facade trim made of limestone and buff-colored brick. The building was to be designed by Ralph Walker of Kenzie, Voorhees & Gmelin, who was then thirty-four years old and relatively inexperienced. At the time, construction was expected to be completed in July 1925.

Walker may have started planning the Barclay–Vesey Building in 1921. He wished to create a "strong corporate image" for the structure, and he sought to ensure that the proposed headquarters would comply with the 1916 Zoning Resolution while also being spacious and relatively inexpensive. According to S. F. Voorhees, an efficiently designed building on the site could not be taller than 43 stories. Consequently, Walker created designs for a structure containing 10, 16, 26, 29, 32, 36, and 42 floors. (Note: Architecture and Building 1926, p. 109, and Walker 1926b, p. 411, say that plans were made for buildings of 10, 16, 26, and 36 stories.) Voorhees's studies found that a 16-story building was most efficient in terms of "quantities of space", while a 29-story building would have the lowest construction costs per square foot. The latter calculation also allowed the architects to determine how many basement stories were required. The height of the tower was in part influenced by how many elevators were required, since elevators took up a significant part of the rentable area on upper stories.

Walker tested out different architectural styles, such as the Gothic and Italian Renaissance styles, before settling on a "modernistic" Art Deco style. The 32-story proposal was ultimately deemed the most efficient. The blueprints for the 32-story proposal, with setbacks at the 10th, 13th, 17th, and 19th floors, were submitted to the New York City Department of Buildings in June 1923. That December, New York Telephone Company officials sought permission from the New York City Board of Appeals to construct part of the building above the surrounding sidewalks.

==== Construction ====
Demolition of existing buildings on the site commenced in May 1923, but high material costs at the time prompted officials to delay construction of the building's foundation. Work on the foundation began on June 20, 1923. Because the site was mostly artificial fill with riprap buttressing, water from the Hudson River sometimes leaked through to the foundation. The building's foundation needed to descend to the level of the bedrock, and the earth was described as having a slimy consistency below water level. Since the bedrock was deeper than originally anticipated, this allowed the builders to include five basement levels rather than four. To keep out the water and slime-like earth, the builders erected a cofferdam with 22 caissons. Each caisson measured 8 feet (2.4 m) thick by 40 feet (12 m) long and was sunk to a depth of 55 to 75 feet (17 to 23 m). The builders then laid down permanent steel struts to hold back the cofferdam. Not only was this likely the first such use of steel bracing, it saved $30,000 compared to the temporary wood bracing that had been used in previous projects.

During construction, almost 700 workers were employed for the project at any given time; tradesmen, such as plumbers and electricians, worked with concrete and steel contractors in overlapping shifts, in order to reduce delays. The superstructure incorporated 20,000 short tons (18,000 long tons; 18,000 t) of steel across its above-ground and below-ground sections, and the builders used six derricks to lift the girders from the street. Four temporary stairways, each containing 351 steps, were built to facilitate the construction of the upper floors. The floor arches were built starting in October 1924; on average, one floor was completed per week. The last rivet in the building was installed in May 1925, and the last brick was laid that September. The New York Building Congress gave craftsmanship awards to several workers to celebrate the building's completion. New York Telephone's vice president James S. McCulloh placed both the first and the last rivets.

The first employees moved to the building on February 19, 1926. All construction was completed by June 1926. However, the New York City Department of Buildings did not declare the building to be completed until April 1927.

=== 20th-century use ===
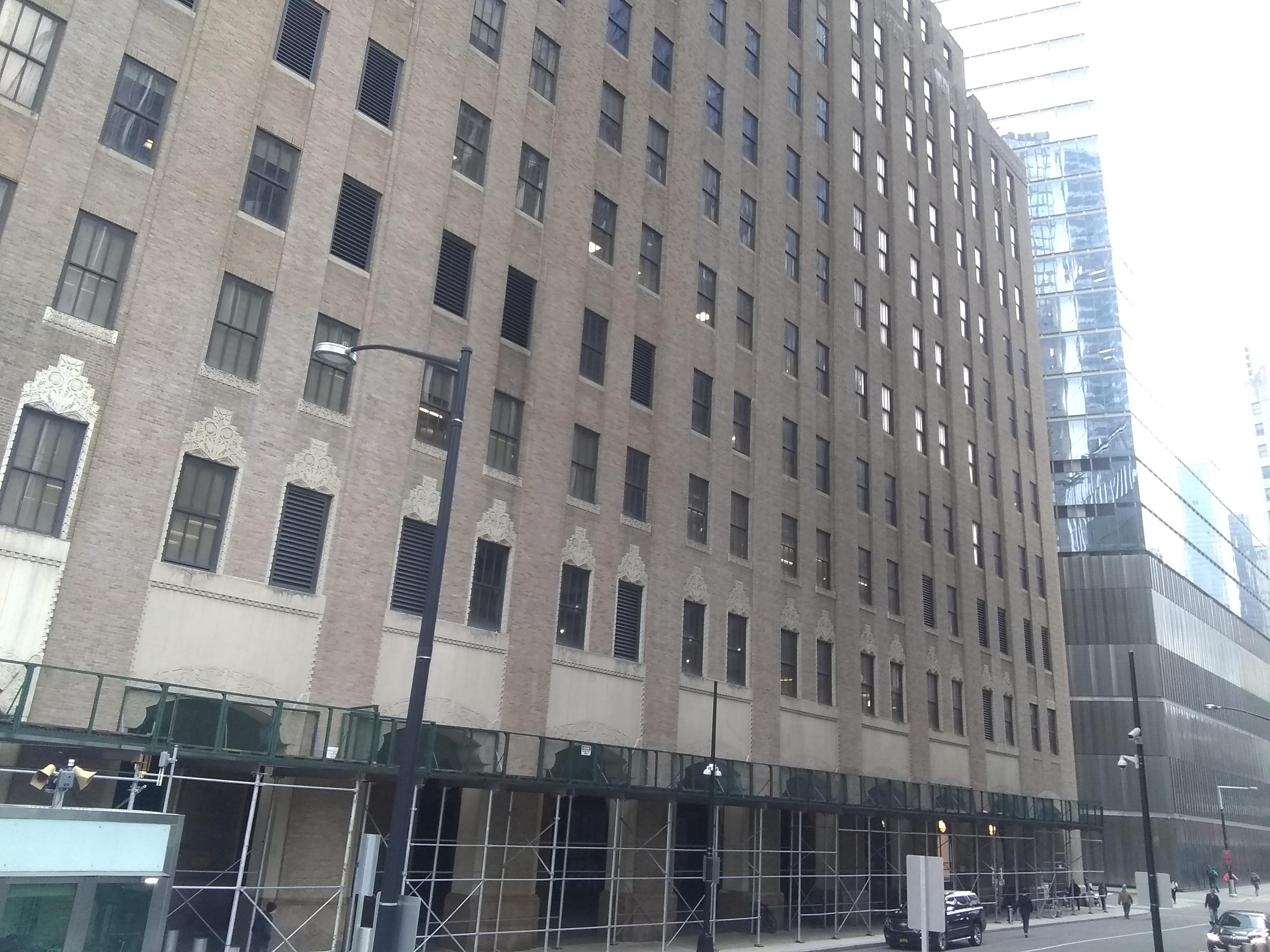
Southern facade; 7 World Trade Center is visible at right

New York Telephone originally had four dial telephone exchanges at the Barclay–Vesey Building. Two additional exchanges were activated in 1928, which would be able to serve 125,000 additional subscribers; at the time, Lower Manhattan was one of the busiest telephone districts in the world. During the mid-20th century, office space was gradually removed to make room for additional equipment.

In 1970, the company signed an agreement to move its executive offices to 1095 Avenue of the Americas, a proposed 53-story speculative development near Bryant Park in Midtown Manhattan, which would be larger than the existing West Street offices. Two years later, the New York Telephone offices had moved out of the Barclay–Vesey Building, though the switching offices remained. When NYNEX was formed as a result of the breakup of the original AT&T in 1984, the building became NYNEX's headquarters. Improvements in technology resulted in the invention of smaller telephone equipment, leading to an increase in available office space at the Barclay–Vesey Building. By the 1990s, some office workers were moving back into the Barclay–Vesey Building.

The exteriors and ground-floor lobbies of the Barclay–Vesey Building and two other telecommunications buildings were designated city landmarks by the New York City Landmarks Preservation Commission in 1991. (Note: The other buildings were the Western Union Building at 60 Hudson Street and the AT&T Long Distance Building at 32 Avenue of the Americas.) New York Telephone supported the designation, and the company's own media had previously described the building as a "landmark". The building became the headquarters of Bell Atlantic following Bell Atlantic's 1997 merger with NYNEX. Subsequently, in 2000, the building became Verizon Communications' headquarters after Verizon was formed from the merger of Bell Atlantic and GTE.

=== 21st-century use ===
==== Damage and restoration ====
At the time of the September 11 attacks, the Barclay–Vesey Building was being renovated. The structure had been adjacent to 7 World Trade Center to the east and the World Trade Center's Twin Towers to the south, and when the three buildings collapsed during the attacks, the south and east facades were severely damaged by falling steel beams. The collapse of the World Trade Center caused the partial collapses of some floor slabs near the windows, though the building as a whole was not in immediate danger of collapse. Debris also sliced water mains, flooding the basements. As a result, underground cable vaults belonging to Verizon, along with other underground utility infrastructure, were heavily damaged from water and debris. The building received only moderate damage because its thick-masonry design gave the building added strength, but two of the facades were damaged. The masonry allowed the structure to absorb much of the energy from debris hitting the building, and damage was restricted mostly to impact points. Although no fires were observed, the ground-floor murals were damaged by smoke.

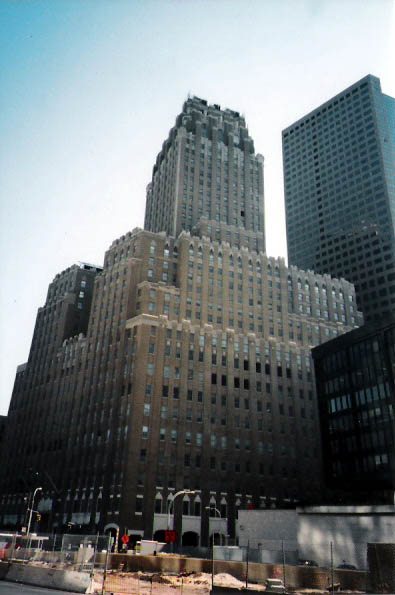
The Barclay-Vesey Building c. 1999. The original 7 World Trade Center can be seen to the right.

Tishman Realty & Construction, which had been planning work on the building prior to the attacks, did a quick assessment of the building in the days after the attack. William F. Collins AIA Architects was the lead architectural firm working on the restoration, while Tishman Interiors managed the project. The Excalibur Bronze Foundry and Petrillo Stone were hired as specialists to restore the intricate ornamental detail in the facade and in the lobby. The facade restoration involved carving motif designs in the ornamental limestone, as well as installing 5,000 ft^{3} (140 m^{3}) of Indiana limestone and 500 ft^{3} (14 m^{3}) of Stony Creek granite. For the murals in the lobby, hypodermic needles were used to inject acrylic resin to restore the paint and plaster. On the executive office floors, workers restored the barrel-vaulted ceilings, plaster friezes, and other elements. Restoration of the building also involved replacing a corner column; A+ Construction of Rye, New York was responsible for this work. The building's 23 elevators were also upgraded; new fire alarms, building command systems, and chillers were installed; and restrooms were made accessible to those with disabilities.

Restoration of the building took three years, at a cost of $1.4 billion. The New York Times stated that the project would cost "three-quarters of the Chrysler Building's estimated total value." Throughout the restoration, the building continued to serve as a telephone switching center. In 2004, the New York Landmarks Conservancy awarded Tishman Interiors the Lucy G. Moses Preservation Award for its restoration work on the building. The restoration was complete by late 2005. That December, Verizon announced it would move its offices from 1095 Avenue of the Americas to 140 West Street, where there would be space for 1,500 employees; the operations hub was relocated to Verizon's campus in Basking Ridge, New Jersey. The structure was added to the National Register of Historic Places in 2009.

==== Partial sale and residential conversion ====
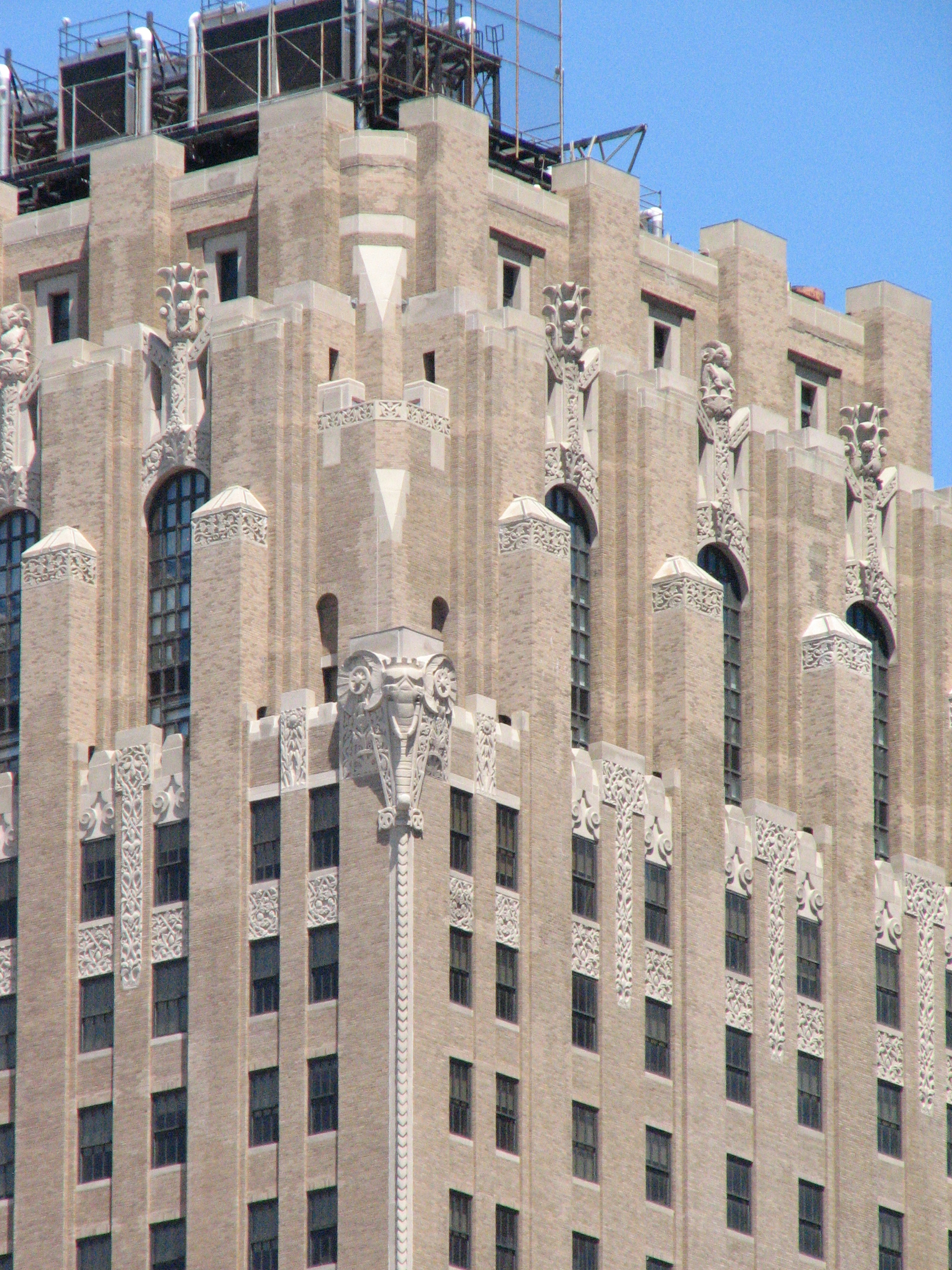
Close-up of exterior corner decoration

The building was partially flooded by storm surges from Hurricane Sandy in 2012, which seeped into the basement levels, took all except one of the elevators out of service, and damaged the lobby murals. The next year, Verizon sold off the top floors to developer Ben Shaoul, the head of Magnum Real Estate. Verizon retained the 28th and 29th floors as well as the ground through 10th stories. In conjunction with this sale, Verizon moved 1,100 employees to Downtown Brooklyn and relocated others to 1095 Avenue of the Americas. To prevent against future flood damage, Verizon installed a storm surge barrier in front of the building.

Following Verizon's sale of the top floors, it was announced that Magnum Real Estate would convert the upper floors to a condominium complex known as 100 Barclay. Shaoul and the CIM Group obtained a $390 million loan in February 2015 to help finance the project. The partners added 157 units to the Barclay–Vesey Building and placed the first condos for sale in early 2016. However, 100 Barclay's residential units remained largely unoccupied by 2019, leading Magnum Real Estate to reduce the penthouse's asking price from $59 million to $39 million. To fill up the unused units, Magnum Real Estate started advertising to renters.

== Critical reception ==
The Barclay–Vesey Building received much positive acclaim when it was completed. New York Telephone dubbed the headquarters "a symbol of service and progress", while Mumford said that the design "expresses the achievements of contemporary American architecture...better than any other skyscraper I have seen." Joseph Pennell called the building "the most impressive modern building in the world", and Talbot Hamlin predicted it would be "a monument of American progress in architecture." The New York Herald, New York Tribune wrote: "The architects deserve our thanks for their trust in the fundamental qualities of design." The building was on the frontispiece of the English version of Toward an Architecture by Le Corbusier, such was its stature. These favorable reviews have continued through the 21st century: the 2009 Guide to New York City Landmarks described the building as "one of the most significant structures in skyscraper design".

The design received awards from civic groups as well. In February 1927, the Architectural League of New York awarded Walker a gold medal of honor for the design, lauding its "quality of excellence" and saying that "A result has been achieved expressive of a high degree of skill and good taste in both general mass and in interesting detail." That October, the Broadway Association gave the New York Telephone Company an award for the Barclay–Vesey Building, calling it a "contribution to civic advancement."

Praise also focused on specific elements of the Barclay–Vesey Building. The architect Harvey Wiley Corbett said that the ornamental program was "straightforward and appropriate and eminently right". Mumford wrote that the building was "perhaps the first large structure" besides Chicago's Auditorium Building to "carry through with a significant scheme of decoration", in particular praising the lobby as "a gay efflorescence of remarkably good decoration". Similarly, Hamlin wrote that the lobby "proves that as beautiful a richness of color and form can be obtained freely and non-stylistically as in any of the historical styles". Following the September 11 attacks, Verizon's corporate-real-estate manager praised the Barclay–Vesey Building's resilience, referring to the building as a "tank".

Some parts of the design were also criticized. In 1991, New York Times architectural writer Phillip Lopate stated that "the corporate publicity aspects of the Barclay–Vesey lobby seem, by today's standards, overdone and kitschy" compared to Walker's later 60 Hudson Street commission, which was austere. Mumford, who largely liked the design, found the base–tower transition and the building's general shape to be an "annoying defect", believing that Walker could have designed the massing more creatively.

== See also ==
- 90 West Street, another nearby building damaged in the 9/11 attacks
- Art Deco architecture of New York City
- List of New York City Designated Landmarks in Manhattan below 14th Street
- National Register of Historic Places listings in Manhattan below 14th Street
