= McCulloh =

McCulloh is a surname. Notable people with the surname include:

- Douglas McCulloh (born 1959), American photographer
- James W. McCulloh (1789–1861), American politician, father of Richard Sears McCulloh
- Richard Sears McCulloh (1818–1894), American civil engineer and professor, uncle of James Sears McCulloh
- James Sears McCulloh (1868–1957), American executive, grandson of James W. McCulloh
- Thayne McCulloh (born 1964), American social psychologist

== See also ==
- McCulloh, California, unincorporated community
- McCulloh Street, state route in Maryland
