= James McCulloh =

James McCulloh may refer to:

- James Sears McCulloh (1868–1957), American business executive
- James W. McCulloh (1789–1861), American politician from Baltimore
