= Judge Lowe =

Judge Lowe may refer to:

- Charles Lowe (judge) (1880–1969), Australian judge, longest-serving judge of the Supreme Court of Victoria
- Mary Johnson Lowe (1924–1999), American judge of the United States District Court for the Southern District of New York
- Ralph P. Lowe (1805–1883), American district and Iowa state judge
- Thomas Hunter Lowe (1928–1984), American judge of the Maryland Court of Special Appeals
