= Hungerford's Tavern =

Historic tavern in Rockville, Maryland

Coordinates: 39°5′0″N 77°9′11″W

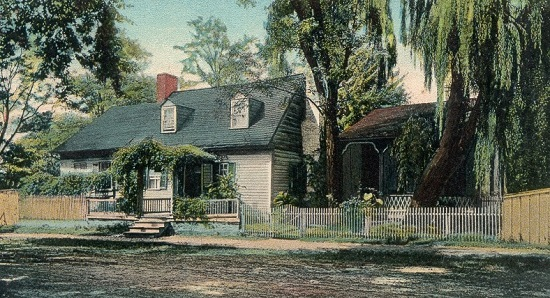
Postcard featuring the building traditionally identified as Hungerford's Tavern, c. 1910

Hungerford's Tavern was an 18th-century tavern in the settlement that developed into Rockville, Maryland. Located along the road between Georgetown and Frederick, it served travelers and became a center of political and civic activity in the surrounding area.

In 1774, local residents met at the tavern and adopted the Hungerford Resolves, one of Maryland's early organized protests against British colonial policies in the period leading to the American Revolution. The tavern also became closely associated with the establishment of Montgomery County's government and the development of Rockville as the county seat.

The building traditionally identified as the tavern was demolished in 1913. A historical marker in Rockville commemorates it, at the northwest corner of West Jefferson and South Washington streets.

== History ==
=== Early history ===
Situated on a principal route between Georgetown and Frederick, Hungerford's Tavern provided food and lodging to travelers and served as a local meeting place by at least 1774. The tavern was associated with Charles Hungerford, who is believed to have operated the establishment without owning the property.

The building traditionally identified as the tavern was a modest, story-and-a-half log structure with dormer windows. It contained four main rooms, including one with a large fireplace used for cooking, and a rear room with a dirt floor. The logs were later covered by a framed exterior, and a smaller neighboring building reportedly housed the tavern keeper and his family.

=== Hungerford Resolves ===
On June 11, 1774, local landowners gathered at the tavern in response to the British government's closure of the Port of Boston. They adopted five declarations known as the Hungerford Resolves, which condemned the blockade, supported coordinated colonial action, and called for an end to commerce with Great Britain and the West Indies until the Boston Port Act was repealed. The meeting also named representatives to communicate with committees elsewhere in Maryland and attend a general committee in Annapolis. The resolves were subsequently published in the Maryland Gazette.

=== County seat ===
When Montgomery County was formed from Frederick County in 1776, the settlement around the tavern was selected as the county seat. The presence of several taverns and ordinaries, including Hungerford's Tavern, made the area convenient for people traveling to attend court by providing food and lodging. The surrounding community was known at different times as Hungerford's Tavern, Montgomery Court House, and Williamsburgh before the Maryland General Assembly established the name Rockville in 1801.

Some sources claim that Hungerford's Tavern itself served as an early courthouse. However, a 1970 article published by the Montgomery County Historical Society notes that the identity of the building used for the county's earliest court proceedings has not been conclusively established.

=== Enslaved labor ===
The tavern relied at least partly on the labor of enslaved people. Historian James H. Johnston wrote that an enslaved woman named Hannah and her daughter Nancy worked there and argued that Hannah may have been the sister of Yarrow Mamout, an African-born Muslim who was enslaved in Maryland before obtaining his freedom. Johnston also described taverns as gathering places where enslaved workers could exchange information with enslaved attendants accompanying travelers.

=== Later history ===
By the early 20th century, the building commonly identified as Hungerford's Tavern was known as the Russell House and stood near the northwest corner of West Jefferson and South Washington streets.

In 1911, members of the Daughters of the American Revolution announced plans to acquire and preserve the historic building. Questions nevertheless remained about whether the building was the original tavern.

The Russell House was demolished in 1913 to make way for a Baptist church and parsonage. Archaeological investigations near the presumed site later recovered fragments of pottery, clay pipes, and wine bottles but did not conclusively establish the tavern's location. A historical marker near the site commemorates Hungerford's Tavern.

== See also ==
- History of Montgomery County, Maryland
- History of Rockville, Maryland
- Montgomery County Circuit Courthouses
