= Thomas Francis McNulty =

American singer and sheriff (1859–1932)

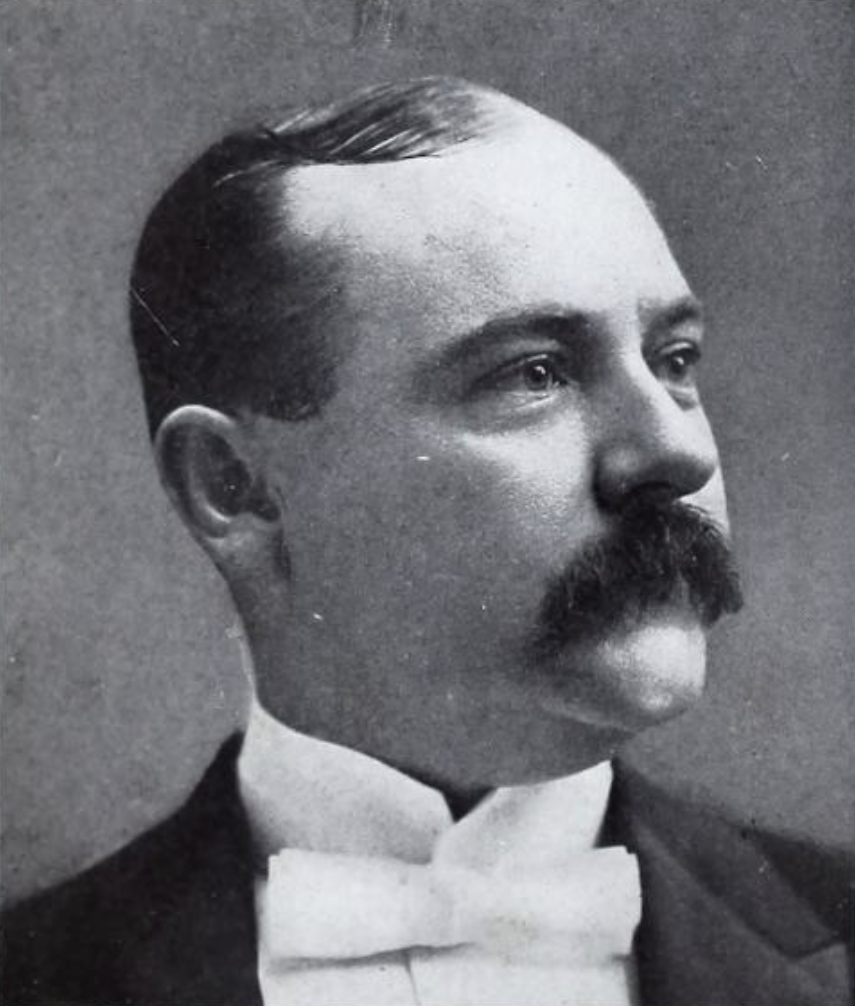
- McNulty in 1914 publication

Sheriff of Baltimore, Maryland
- In office 1913–1923

Personal details
- Born: September 10, 1859 Baltimore, Maryland, U.S.
- Died: May 25, 1932 (aged 72) Baltimore, Maryland, U.S.
- Resting place: New Cathedral Cemetery; Baltimore, Maryland, U.S.
- Party: Democratic
- Spouse: Isabella B.
- Children: 6

Thomas Francis McNulty (September 10, 1859 – May 25, 1932) was an American Democratic political operative and epithetist. He was at one-time sheriff of Baltimore, Maryland. McNulty is most remembered, however, as the composer of the children's song "The Old Grey Mare".

== Early life ==
Thomas Francis McNulty was born on September 10, 1859, in Baltimore, Maryland, to Thomas Francis McNulty. He attended St. John's Parochial School but left at the age of 12. He started work as an errand boy. He then worked as a house and sign painter. He was an organizer and singer at St. Paul's Catholic Church in Baltimore.

== Career ==
McNulty worked at the Government Printing Office in Washington, D.C., from 1884 to 1886. In 1884, McNulty sang for the campaign of William Hinson Cole. After working at the Government Printing Office, McNulty returned to Baltimore and was appointed to assist with the mayoral re-election campaign of Ferdinand Latrobe in 1887.

McNulty composed "The Old Grey Mare" during the campaign of Ferdinand Latrobe with its pun on words as a political epithet of the aging Baltimore Mayor Latrobe, who also drove about in a carriage, which was drawn by a decrepit old mare that he had kept for years. The song so endeared the Baltimore voting public to Latrobe that he was re-elected as Mayor of Baltimore against all odds. McNulty was after that recruited to work for the presidential campaigns of Stephen Grover Cleveland and William Jennings Bryan. He did a singing tour for Cleveland's 1884 campaign in Indiana, Ohio, and West Virginia with Arthur Pue Gorman. In 1887, McNulty assisted with the campaign for Maryland Governor Elihu Emory Jackson. He also sang for candidates John Walter Smith, Edwin Warfield, and Austin Lane Crothers. His "Grover Mine" campaign song for Cleveland was later adapted for the campaign of Governor Albert Ritchie. It was sung to the tune of "Baby Mine". He gained a national reputation as a campaign singer.

McNulty worked in the liquor business but withdrew from it when he ran for sheriff. He also worked as treasurer of the Riall-Jackson Company. McNulty was a candidate for the Democratic nomination for sheriff in 1895 and received the Democratic nomination for sheriff of Baltimore in 1897, but was defeated both times by political boss I. Freeman Rasin. He was defeated again in 1911. He became sheriff of Baltimore in 1913 and served until 1923. In 1923, he sought re-election, but due to ill health and another nominee, he withdrew his name, and John E. Potee was elected.

McNulty sang last publicly on St. Patrick's Day in 1927. In December 1930, McNulty was appointed deputy sheriff under Sheriff Joseph C. Deegan. He served until February 1931, when he was stricken with ill health.

He was given an honorary membership to the International Association of Funeral Directors.

== Works ==
=== "The Old Grey Mare" ===
{earliest incarnation}

The Old Grey Mare,
It ain't what it used to be,
Ain't what it used to be,
Ain't what it used to be.
The old grey mare,
It ain't what it used to be,
Many long years ago.

The Old Grey Mare,
It kicked on the whiffletree,
Kicked on the whiffletree,
Kicked on the whiffletree.
The old grey mare,
It kicked on the whiffletree,
Many long years ago.

Many long years ago,
Many long years ago,
The old grey mare,
It kicked on the whiffletree,
Many long years ago.

== Personal life ==
McNulty married Isabella B. They had one son and five daughters, Thomas F. Jr., M. Claire, Mrs. J. Carroll Watts Jr., Mrs. S. Clarence Smith, Mrs. Elmer Swearer and Mrs. Hugh J. Carroll.

McNulty was noted as an amateur cook, particularly of steak and terrapin and crab soup. He was given the nickname "Earl of Caroline Street" for his cooking.

McNulty died of a heart attack on May 25, 1932, at 1405 North Caroline Street home in Baltimore. He was buried at New Cathedral Cemetery in Baltimore.
