= Ivy Hill (disambiguation) =

Ivy Hill, Newark, New Jersey is a neighborhood in Newark, New Jersey, U.S.

Ivy Hill may also refer to:

Places in the U.S.

- Ivy Hill (Marriottsville, Maryland), a historic house and plantation
- Ivy Hill, Philadelphia, Pennsylvania, a section of the Cedarbrook neighborhood
- Ivy Hill Cemetery (Maryland), Laurel, Maryland
- Ivy Hill Cemetery (Philadelphia), Cedarbrook, Philadelphia, Pennsylvania
- Ivy Hill Cemetery (Alexandria, Virginia), Alexandria, Virginia
- Ivy Hill Cemetery (Smithfield, Virginia), listed on the National Register of Historic Places
- Ivy Hill Plantation in Mecklenburg County, Virginia; listed in the Virginia Landmarks Register
