= New Cathedral Cemetery =

Cemetery in Baltimore, Maryland

- Interactive map of New Cathedral Cemetery

Details
- Location: Baltimore, Maryland
- Country: United States of America
- Coordinates: 39.287708°N 76.687355°W
- Type: Roman Catholic
- Size: 125 acres (51 ha)
- Find a Grave: New Cathedral Cemetery

The New Cathedral Cemetery, formerly Bonnie Brae Cemetery, is a Catholic cemetery covering 125 acres on the westside of Baltimore, Maryland, at 4300 Old Frederick Road. It is the final resting place of 110,000 people, including numerous individuals who played important roles in Maryland history.

== History ==
New Cathedral Cemetery was begun in 1869. It didn't open until 1871, replacing Cathedral Cemetery (established in 1816), which moved its burials to the new cemetery. The Bonnie Brae estate was purchased from Captain Charles McBlair to establish the new cemetery. For a time, the new cemetery was called the Bonnie Brae Cemetery. Burials were transferred from the old cemetery to the new cemetery between 1877 and 1890. The cemetery was originally 40–50 acres, but, as of 2011, had expanded to 122 acres (49 ha).

As of 2018, the cemetery is 125 acres (51 ha).

== Interments ==
The cemetery is the final resting place of 100,000 people. contains several players from the Baltimore Orioles, including four members of the Baseball Hall of Fame: John McGraw, Joseph Kelley, Ned Hanlon, and Wilbert Robinson. It is believed that no other cemetery has so many Hall of Famers.

=== Other notable burials ===
- Ephraim Francis Baldwin
- Michael J. Birmingham (died 1964), Baltimore County executive
- Edward H. Burke (1886–1955), state delegate and lawyer
- John Lee Carroll
- Charles Pearce Coady
- William Hinson Cole (1837–1886), U.S. Representative from Maryland
- Miriam Cooper
- Frederick L. Dewberry (1921–1990), Baltimore County Executive, Deputy Secretary of the Maryland Department of Transportation
- Edmund Francis Dunne
- George Proctor Kane (1817–1878), Mayor of Baltimore and Marshal of Police in Baltimore
- Otis Keilholtz (1838–1883), Speaker of the Maryland House of Delegates and ex-officio mayor of Baltimore
- Ambrose Jerome Kennedy (1893-1950), Baltimore city councilman, Maryland state senator, and U.S. Congressman representing Maryland's Fourth Congressional District, 1933-1941.
- Aloysius Leo Knott (died 1918), American politician, lawyer and educator
- John Lee
- J. R. Malone
- Bobby Mathews
- Henry May (1816–1866), U.S. Representative from Maryland
- Thomas Francis McNulty (1859–1932), American sheriff and composer
- Hugh Meade (1907–1949), state delegate and U.S. congressman
- John Mullan (road builder)
- John L. V. Murphy (1878–1933), member of the Maryland House of Delegates
- Herbert O'Conor
- Eugene O'Dunne
- Vincent Luke Palmisano
- Theodore Wells Pietsch
- Wilbert Robinson
- Walt Smallwood
- John Surratt
- George J. Turner
