= James Sears McCulloh =

American business executive, former president and chairman of New York Telephone Company

President of the New York Telephone Company
- In office 1924–1933

58th President of the Saint Andrew's Society of the State of New York
- In office 1932–1934
- Preceded by: George McGeachin
- Succeeded by: Andrew Baxter

Personal details
- Born: September 5, 1868 Englewood, New Jersey
- Died: July 5, 1957 (aged 88) Rye, New York, U.S.
- Spouse(s): May White (died 1934) Eleanor Silkman Gilman (m. 1936; died 1956)
- Relations: Richard Sears McCulloh (uncle); James W. McCulloh (grandfather)
- Children: 2
- Parent(s): James William McCulloh; Isabella Steel Walker

James Sears McCulloh (September 5, 1868 – July 5, 1957) was an American business executive who served as president and chairman of the New York Telephone Company.

== Early life ==
McCulloh was born on September 5, 1868, in Englewood, New Jersey. A son of James William McCulloh (1827–1897) and the former Isabella Steel Walker (1829–1915), his two brothers were Walter McCulloh (of Niagara Falls, New York) and Charles Sears McCulloh.

He was a lineal descendant of John McCulloch, who was born in Kirkcudbright, Scotland, in April 1747 and came to America before the Revolutionary War in 1759 (and later dropped the final C from his last name). His paternal uncle was the civil engineer and professor Richard Sears McCulloh and his paternal grandfather was James W. McCulloh, Speaker of the Maryland House of Delegates.

== Career ==
In 1885, McCulloh began working as a railroad clerk with the West Shore Railroad. By 1890, he was assistant to the Superintendent of Telephone and Signals. From 1890 to 1893, he studied at the joint operating headquarters of the West Shore Railroad and the Western Union Telegraph Company in Weehawken, New Jersey.

Following his studies of telegraphy and telephony, he joined the long line departments of the American Telephone and Telegraph Company in New York in 1893, quickly being promoted to chief operator of operating work and then "special agent in charge of general traffic studies and traffic development" in 1899. After working in Chicago and New England, he became general contract agent of the New York Telephone Company in 1908. From 1919 to 1923, he served as a vice president in charge of public relations and commercial work. By 1924, he was made president of the company and became chairman of the board in 1933 before his retirement in 1938. As president, he placed the last rivet during the construction of the Barclay–Vesey Building. After his retirement from the New York Telephone Company, he served as president and chairman of the Rye National Bank. Mculloh had served as a director of the Rye National Bank since December 18, 1933.

McCulloh also served as a director of the National Surety Company, the Empire City Subway Company, the Holmes Electric Protective Company as a trustee of the Bowery Savings Bank, and served as vice-president of the New York State Chamber of Commerce. He also served as a member of the "advisory committee of the American Express branch of the Chase National Bank of New York City."

Gordon was a member of the American Yacht Club and the Apawamis Club, both in Rye (where he had been a resident since 1898 and was a governor and founder of the Manursing Island Club), and the Saint Andrew's Society of the State of New York where he served as second vice-president, first vice-president and president of the Society from 1932 to 1934.

== Personal life ==
McCulloh was married to May White (1866–1933), the daughter of the late Dr. Samuel Stockton White. They were listed in the Social Register. Together, they were the parents of:

- Gordon McCulloh (1899–1968), a Princeton University graduate who served as vice-president of the advertising agency of Cunningham & Walsh. He married Virginia Gilman in 1936.
- Amy Goodwin McCulloh (1903–1934)

On January 11, 1936, he was married to Eleanor (née Silkman) Gilman (1883–1956) at St. John's Church in Rye. She was the widow of Theodore Gilman Jr. (son of banker Theodore Gilman) and a daughter of Judge Theodore H. Silkman.

McCulloh died at Warriston, his residence, 890 Forest Avenue in Rye, on July 5, 1957. He was buried at Greenwood Union Cemetery in Rye.
