= Alfred John Lill Jr. =

President of the Amateur Athletic Union (1880–1956)

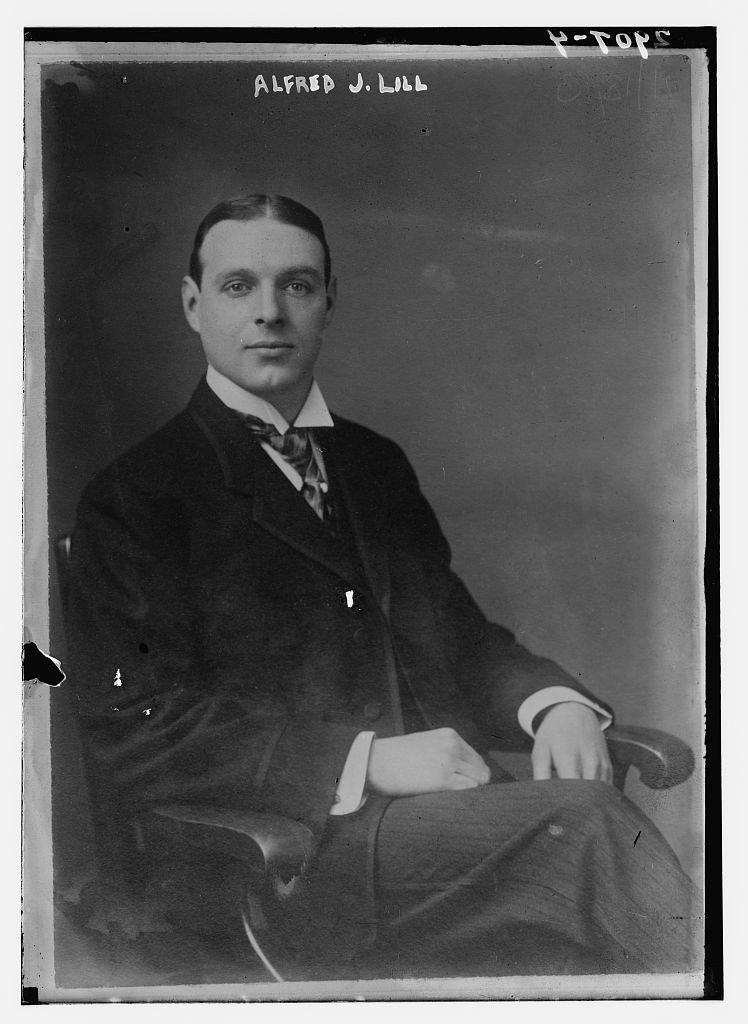
- Lill, c. 1913

President of the Amateur Athletic Union
- In office 1913–1914
- Preceded by: Gustavus Town Kirby
- Succeeded by: George J. Turner

Personal details
- Born: January 1, 1880 Boston, Massachusetts, U.S.
- Died: March 18, 1956 (aged 76) Somerset Hospital; Somerville, New Jersey, U.S.
- Spouse: Mary V. Gleason
- Parent: Alfred John Lill Sr.

Alfred John Lill Jr. (January 1, 1880 - March 18, 1956) was the president of the Amateur Athletic Union and a member of the United States Olympic Committee for the 1936 Summer Olympics in Berlin, Germany.

== Biography ==
He was born on January 1, 1880, to Alfred John Lill Sr. in Boston, Massachusetts. He married Mary V. Gleason.

In 1913 he was elected president of the Amateur Athletic Union running against George Franklin Pawling. He replaced Gustavus Town Kirby.

He was a member of the United States Olympic Committee for the 1936 Summer Olympics in Berlin, Germany. He and Governor George Howard Earle III of Pennsylvania and Mayor Fiorello La Guardia of New York City proposed an Olympic boycott.

He travelled to New Jersey to visit his daughter. He died on March 19, 1956, at the Somerset Hospital in Somerville, New Jersey.
