= Emanuel Gorfine =

American politician (1895–1984)

Member of the Maryland Senate from the Baltimore City, 4th district
- In office 1939–1943

Speaker of the Maryland House of Delegates
- In office 1935–1938

Member of the Maryland House of Delegates from the Baltimore City, 4th district
- In office 1931–1938

Personal details
- Born: November 28, 1895 Baltimore, Maryland, U.S.
- Died: September 28, 1984 (aged 88) Baltimore, Maryland, U.S.
- Party: Democratic
- Occupation: Attorney

Emanuel Gorfine (November 28, 1895 – September 28, 1984) was an American politician and lawyer.

Born and raised in Baltimore, Gorfine attended Baltimore City College and the University of Maryland School of Law, graduating from the latter in 1917. He became a partner in the law firm Silberstein & Gorfine after passing the bar exam and during World War I was attached to the Naval Intelligence Bureau.

Gorfine was a Democratic Party member of the Maryland House of Delegates from 1931 to 1938, and became the first Jewish person to serve as Speaker, a position he held between 1935 and 1938. He was subsequently elected to the Maryland Senate and acted as chair of the Judicial Proceedings Committee. After leaving the senate, Gorfine was appointed to the State Industrial Accident Commission and served as chairman for two terms.
