= Fetter Schrier Hoblitzell =

American politician (1838-1900)

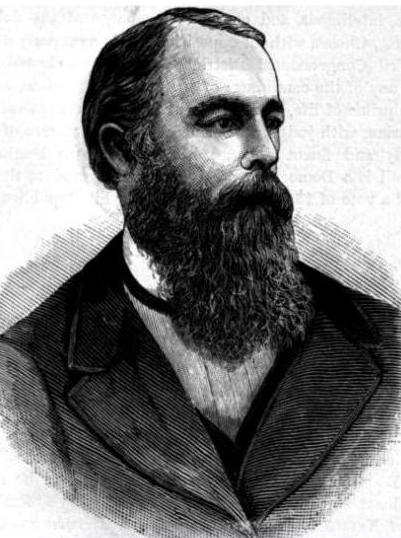
- Hoblitzell, c. 1882

Member of the U.S. House of Representatives from Maryland's 3rd congressional district
- In office March 4, 1881 – March 3, 1885

Member of the Maryland House of Delegates
- In office 1870-1872; 1876-1880

Speaker of the Maryland House of Delegates
- In office 1878

Personal details
- Born: October 7, 1838 Cumberland, Maryland, USA
- Died: May 2, 1900 (aged 61) Baltimore, Maryland, USA
- Party: Democratic Party
- Occupation: Politician, lawyer
- Military career
- Allegiance: Confederate States of America
- Branch: Confederate Army
- Rank: Private
- Unit: First Maryland Regiment of Infantry
- Conflicts: American Civil War

Fetter Schrier Hoblitzell (October 7, 1838 – May 2, 1900) was an American politician and Congressman from Maryland.

== Biography ==
Born in Cumberland, Maryland, Hoblitzell attended primary school and graduated from the Allegany Academy of Cumberland. He studied law, was admitted to the bar in 1859, and commenced practice in Baltimore, Maryland. During the American Civil War, Hoblitzell served as a private in the First Maryland Regiment of Infantry of the Confederate Army.

After the war, Hoblitzell resumed the practice of law and served as a member of the Maryland House of Delegates in 1870 and 1876. He was reelected in 1878 and served as speaker of the house. He was later elected as a Democrat to the Forty-seventh and Forty-eighth Congresses, serving from March 4, 1881, to March 3, 1885. Afterwards, he served as city counselor of Baltimore in 1888 and 1889, and resumed the practice of law. He died in Baltimore, and is interred in Loudon Park Cemetery.

Political offices
| Preceded by Lewis C. Smith | Speaker of the Maryland House of Delegates; 1878 | Succeeded by Hiram McCullough |
U.S. House of Representatives
| Preceded by William Kimmel | Member of the U.S. House of Representatives from Maryland's 3rd congressional district 1881–1885 | Succeeded by William Hinson Cole |
