= Clinton McCullough =

American politician and lawyer (1844–1895)

Member of the Maryland Senate from the Cecil County district
- In office 1886–1890
- Preceded by: Levi R. Mearns
- Succeeded by: John S. Wirt

Personal details
- Born: December 11, 1844 near Elkton, Maryland, U.S.
- Died: April 11, 1895 (aged 50) Elkton, Maryland, U.S.
- Resting place: Elkton Cemetery; Elkton, Maryland, U.S.
- Party: Democratic
- Spouse: Jeanette Pearce
- Children: 4
- Parent: Hiram McCullough (father)
- Education: Princeton College
- Occupation: Politician; lawyer

Clinton McCullough (December 11, 1844 – April 11, 1895) was an American politician and lawyer from Maryland. He served as a member of the Maryland Senate, representing Cecil County from 1886 to 1890.

== Early life ==
Clinton McCullough was born on December 11, 1844, at "Bell Hill" near Elkton, Maryland, to Hiram McCullough. His mother's maiden name was Ricketts. His father was a U.S. congressman. He was educated at Elkton Academy. He graduated from Princeton College in 1864. He read law at his father's office and was admitted to the bar in 1866.

== Career ==
McCullough was elected as state's attorney in 1871 and 1875. McCullough was a Democrat. He was a member of the Maryland Senate, representing Cecil County, from 1886 to 1890. He was appointed auditor in chancery.

McCullough had a law office at North Street in Elkton. He was an attorney for the Mutual Building Association of Cecil County.

McCullough served on the board of trustees of Elkton Academy at the time of his death. He was a member of the board of managers of the Mutual Insurance Company.

== Personal life ==
McCullough married Jeanette Pearce, daughter of Matthew C. Pierce and niece of John C. Groome. They had four sons, Clinton Jr., Matthew, Hiram and Groome.

McCullough died of heart disease on April 11, 1895, at his home in Elkton. He was buried at the family lot in Elkton Cemetery.
