= Montgomery County Circuit Courthouses =

Historic district in Maryland, United States

- Montgomery County Courthouse Historic District
- U.S. National Register of Historic Places
- U.S. Historic district
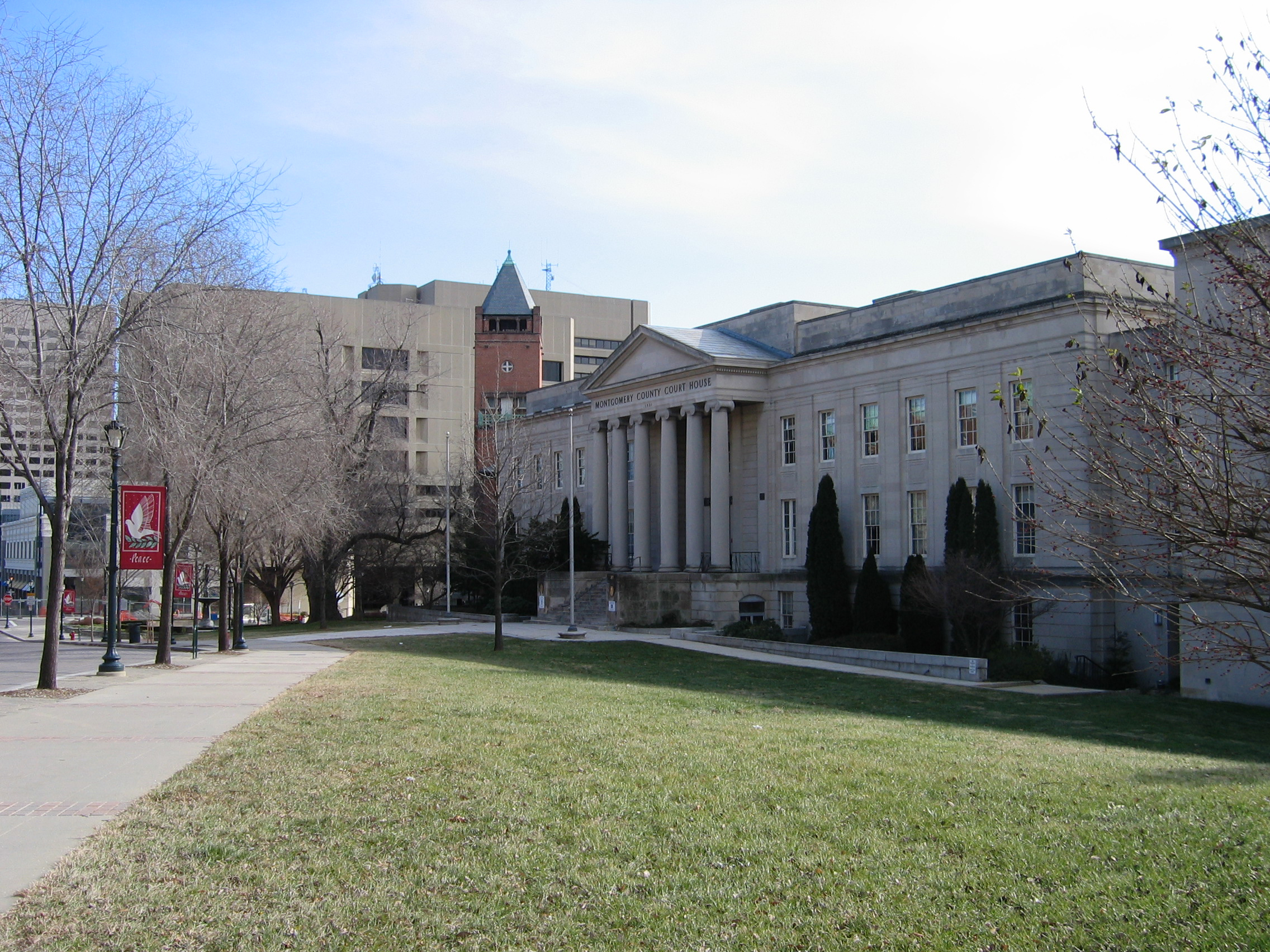
- Grey Courthouse in the foreground, Red Brick Courthouse in the middle ground, and the Judicial Center in the background

- Location within Maryland Location within the United States
- Location: Courthouse Sq. and S. Washington St., Rockville, Maryland
- Coordinates: 39°4′59″N 77°9′9″W
- Area: 7 acres (2.8 ha)
- Architect: Davis, Frank; Et al.
- Architectural style: Late 19th And 20th Century Revivals, Late Victorian
- NRHP reference No.: 86003352
- Added to NRHP: September 2, 1986

The Montgomery County Courthouse Historic District, designated in 1986, includes several buildings listed on the National Register of Historic Places in Rockville, Maryland. The two-block district is focused on what remains of Rockville's old commercial, governmental, and residential center, most of which was demolished during urban renewal in the 1960s.

The district includes the Romanesque Revival-style Red Brick Courthouse, designed by prominent Baltimore architect Frank E. Davis and built in 1891. Located at 29 Courthouse Square, it houses the refurbished Grand Courtroom, which was once used by the Montgomery County Circuit Court. The district also includes the 1931 Neoclassical-style Grey Courthouse and its 1960s addition (no longer used by the courts); the 1939 Georgian-styled post office of limestone construction; and the 1930 Art Deco stone building built for the Farmers Banking and Trust Company.

The courthouses are part of a cluster of municipal and county buildings at the corner of Maryland Avenue and Jefferson Street (Maryland Route 28) in downtown Rockville. Other buildings in the cluster include Rockville City Hall, the District Court of Maryland for Montgomery County (opened in 2011), and the Montgomery County Judicial Center, a Brutalist building opened in 1982 at 50 Maryland Avenue, which houses Montgomery County's Circuit Court, the Offices of the Sheriff, the Register of Wills, the Orphans' Court, and the State's Attorney for Montgomery County.

== History ==
There have been four courthouses in Rockville since it was established as the county seat in 1776. Court was held at the Hungerford's Tavern until a frame courthouse was erected in the 1790s. In 1835, the General Assembly funded a new brick courthouse. In 1890, the legislature approved funding for the Red Brick Courthouse.

From 1927 to 1954, the lower level of the courthouse served as the headquarters of the Montgomery County Police Department.
