= Gustavus Town Kirby =

American lawyer

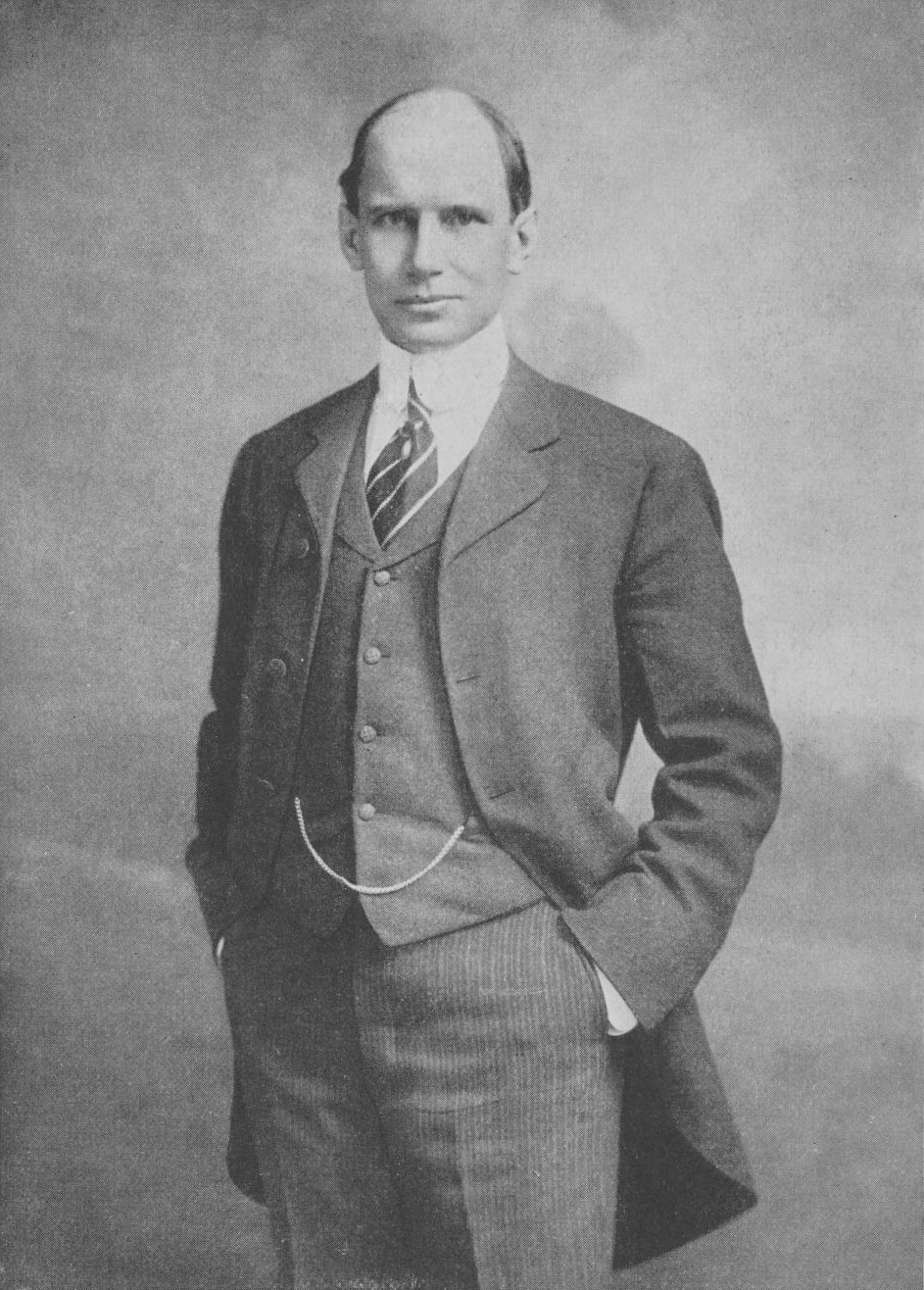
- Kirby circa 1914

President of the Amateur Athletic Union
- In office 1911–1912
- Preceded by: George Franklin Pawling
- Succeeded by: Alfred John Lill, Jr.

President of the United States Olympic Committee
- In office 1920–1924
- Preceded by: Robert Means Thompson
- Succeeded by: Robert Means Thompson

Personal details
- Born: January 22, 1874; Philadelphia, Pennsylvania
- Died: February 28, 1956 (aged 82); Bedford Hills, New York
- Spouse: Wilhelmine Stewart Claflin (1884-1941)
- Education: Columbia University; Columbia University Law School

Gustavus Town Kirby (January 22, 1874 - February 28, 1956) was the president of the Amateur Athletic Union from 1911 to 1913. He was on every United States Olympic Committee from 1896 to 1956. He was chairman of the advisory committee for the Intercollegiate Association of Amateur Athletes of America from 1896 to 1928.

== Biography ==
He was born on January 22, 1874, in Philadelphia, Pennsylvania.

He attended Columbia University, where he was on the track team from 1893 to 1895. While in college he organized a committee to send athletes to the 1896 Summer Olympics. He then attended Columbia University Law School. In 1896 he won the Intercollegiate Fencing Association championship.

Around 1912 he married Wilhelmine Stewart Dunn-Claflin (1885–1941).

He was president of the United States Olympic Committee for the 1920 Summer Olympics and the chairman for the 1924 Summer Olympics.

He became a widower in 1941 when his wife died at the LeRoy Sanitarium in New York City.

He died in Bedford Hills, New York, on February 28, 1956. He was buried in Saint Matthew's Episcopal Churchyard in Bedford, New York.
