= Ivy Hill (Marriottsville, Maryland) =

- Location within Maryland Location within the United States
- 39°20′17″N 76°53′27″W
- Location: Marriottsville, Maryland

History
- Built: 1811

Ivy Hill is a historic home and farm and plantation located in Marriottsville, Howard County, Maryland. The property was part of General William Hammond Marriott's property. Marriott would later become Speaker of the Maryland House of Delegates in 1822. During the Civil War the farm was searched as the potential hiding place of 1st Maryland Infantry, CSA General Bradley Tyler Johnson, who was in the attic at the nearby Mt. Pleasant Farm.

== See also ==
- List of Howard County properties in the Maryland Historical Trust
