= Hiram McCullough =

American politician (1813–1885)

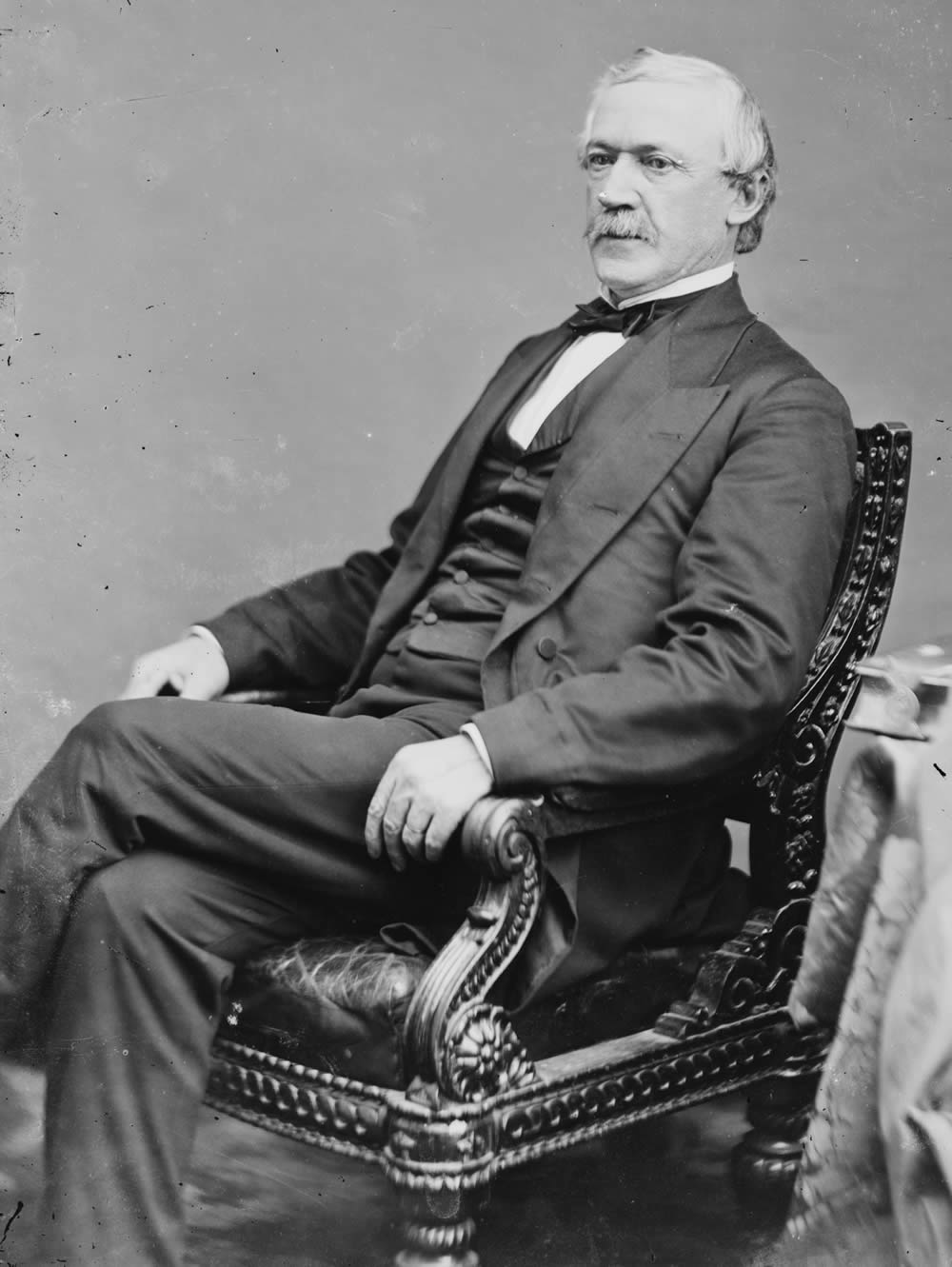

Speaker of the Maryland House of Delegates
- In office 1880
- Preceded by: Fetter Schrier Hoblitzell
- Succeeded by: Otis Keilholtz

Member of the Maryland House of Delegates
- In office 1880–1881 Serving with Joseph H. Steele and James M. Touchstone

Member of the U.S. House of Representatives
- In office March 4, 1865 – March 3, 1869

Member of the Maryland Senate from the Cecil County district
- In office 1845–1851
- Preceded by: George R. Howard
- Succeeded by: John M. Miller

Personal details
- Born: September 26, 1813 Elkton, Maryland, U.S.
- Died: March 4, 1885 (aged 71) Elkton, Maryland, U.S.
- Resting place: Presbyterian Church; Elkton, Maryland, U.S.
- Party: Democratic
- Spouse: Sarah Jane Ricketts (m. 1842)
- Children: 2, including Clinton
- Occupation: Politician; lawyer

Hiram McCullough (September 26, 1813 – March 4, 1885) was a U.S. Congressman from Maryland who served two terms from 1865 to 1869. McCullough served in the Maryland Senate from 1845 to 1851. He also served in the Maryland House of Delegates from 1880 to 1881 and served as the Speaker of the Maryland House of Delegates in 1880.

== Early life ==
Hiram McCullough was born on September 26, 1813, near Elkton, Maryland. McCullough pursued an academic course at Elkton Academy and later studied law. He was admitted to the bar in 1837, commencing practice in Elkton.

== Career ==
McCullough served in the Maryland Senate from 1845 until 1851, and was an unsuccessful candidate in 1850 for election to the Thirty-second Congress. In 1850, he was appointed one of the codifiers of the laws of Maryland.

McCullough practiced law with Henry C. Mackall.

In 1864, McCullough was elected as a Democrat to the Thirty-ninth and Fortieth Congresses, serving Maryland's 1st Congressional district from March 4, 1865, until March 3, 1869. He resumed the practice of law and was for many years counsel for the Philadelphia, Wilmington and Baltimore Railroad. He was a delegate to the Democratic National Convention in 1864 and 1868, and later served as a member of the Maryland House of Delegates in 1880 and 1881. He was elected Speaker of the House in 1880.

== Personal life ==
McCullough married Sarah Jane Ricketts in January 1842. They had two sons, state senator Clinton and Hiram Rudolph McCullough. His brother was Passmore McCullough.

McCullough died in Elkton on March 4, 1885, and was interred in the Presbyterian Church in Elkton.

U.S. House of Representatives
| Preceded by John Creswell | Member of the U.S. House of Representatives from Maryland's 1st congressional district 1865–1869 | Succeeded by Samuel Hambleton |
Political offices
| Preceded by Fetter Hoblitzell | Speaker of the Maryland House of Delegates; 1880 | Succeeded by Otis Keilholtz |
