= The American Republican and Baltimore Daily Clipper =

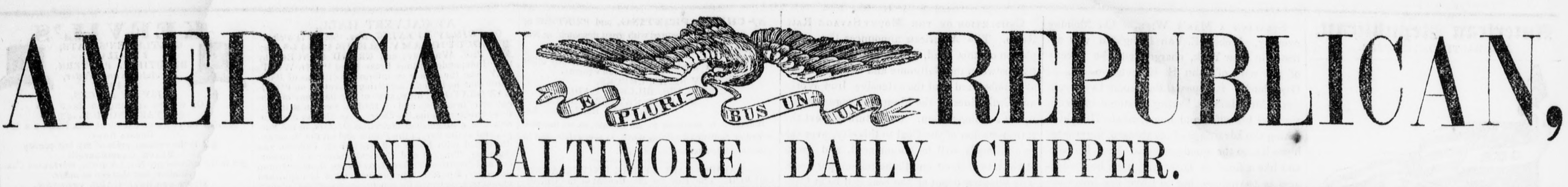

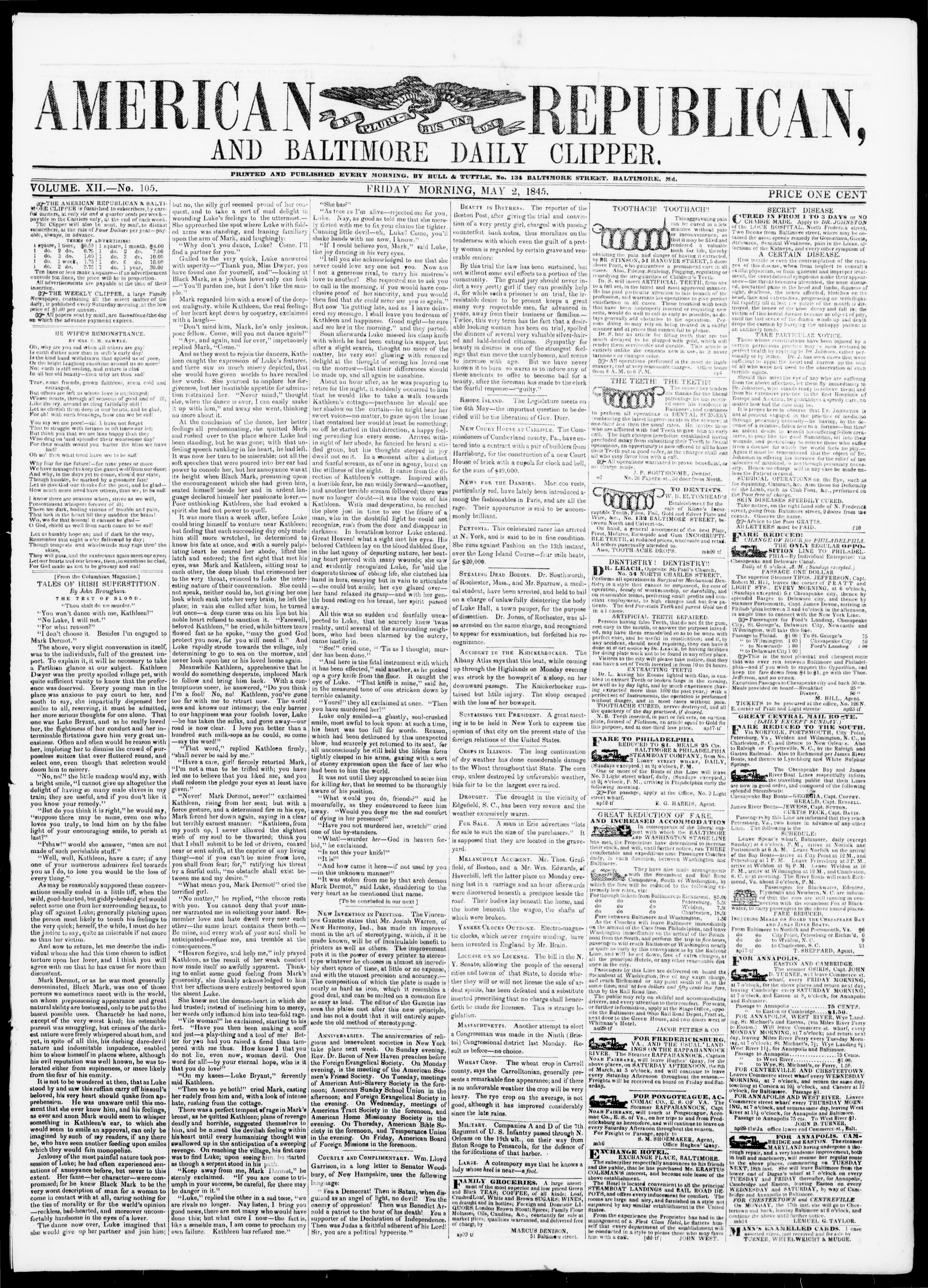
- May 2, 1845 front page
- Founded: 1839
- Ceased publication: 1875
- Political alignment: Pro-slavery, pro-union
- Language: English
- City: Baltimore, Maryland

The American Republican and Baltimore Daily Clipper was a newspaper published in Baltimore, Maryland in the mid-1800s. The paper supported slavery but opposed Confederate secession in the American Civil War, based on the premise that it would be possible to maintain slavery under the Union.

== History ==
The American Republican and Baltimore Daily Clipper began as a daily newspaper titled, the Baltimore Clipper, on September 7, 1839, by John H. Hewitt & Co., editors and proprietors. A weekly edition of the paper, The Ocean, began on June 27, 1840. The name of the paper was briefly changed to American Republican from 1844 to 1847 to reflect its stance as a voice for the newly formed Know-Nothing Party. The paper reflected a nativist perspective advocating restrictions on immigration and endorsed John Bell, the Constitutional Union Party candidate in the 1860 presidential election. Throughout the Civil War, however, the paper was Republican in politics and supported the administration and reelection of Abraham Lincoln. In addition to local news, the Clipper reported on national news such as the inauguration of President James K. Polk, the annexation of Texas, the Bear Flag revolt and military occupation of California, the signing of the Oregon Treaty, the Mexican-American War, and the Great Fire of Pittsburgh.

Upon a change of ownership, the Clipper ceased production on September 30, 1865, to become the Baltimore Daily Commercial on October 2, 1865. Publishers William Wales & Co. described the Commercial as a "mercantile and political journal... to be devoted mainly to the growing interests of Maryland, in every department of commerce and industry" and "independent of cliques or parties." This focus on Maryland interests extended to publishing national news including Reconstruction, the ratification of the Thirteenth Amendment and the abolition of slavery, and the passage of the Civil Rights Act of 1866. Looking abroad, the Daily Commercial also reported on the Fenian movement for Irish independence and the 1863-1875 European cholera pandemic.

The title of the paper changed again to The Daily Commercial in December 1867, succeeded by The Evening Commercial in March 1868. Each paper appeared six days a week, excepting Sundays. The Evening Commercial ceased publication in 1869 following the sale of publishers William Wales & Company to the Democratic Association of Baltimore. William Hinson Cole and Edward M. Yerger purchased the Commercial and began printing the Evening Journal on September 4, 1871. In 1875, the Journal was purchased by Frederick Raine of the German-language newspaper Der Deutsche Correspondent, and discontinued.
