= George J. Turner =

American amateur sports administrator

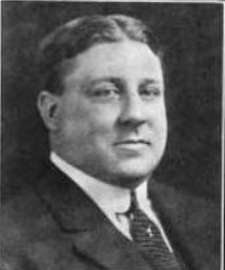

President of the Amateur Athletic Union
- In office 1915–1916
- Preceded by: Alfred John Lill Jr.

Personal details
- Born: 1873 Baltimore, Maryland
- Died: January 9, 1936 (aged 62–63)

George J. Turner (1873 – January 9, 1936) was the treasurer of the South Atlantic Association when he was elected president of the Amateur Athletic Union from 1915 to 1916. During his tenure the AAU joined with the Intercollegiate Association of Amateur Athletes of America to set the rules that defined amateur sports.

== Biography ==
He was born in Baltimore, Maryland in August 1873. He attended Mount Saint Mary's College.

He was a coach for the Baltimore Athletic Club rowing team and they were unbeaten in 1896. He was the treasurer of the South Atlantic Association when he was elected president of the Amateur Athletic Union in 1915 to replace Alfred John Lill Jr. He served as head of the AAU from 1915 to 1916.

His first duty at the Amateur Athletic Union was to suspend Abel Kiviat, who had requested excessive expense money for running in a track meet in Troy, New York.

He died January 9, 1936, and was buried in New Cathedral Cemetery, Baltimore City, Maryland.
