= George R. Howard =

American politician (died 1884)

Member of the Maryland Senate from the Cecil County district
- In office 1840–1845
- Preceded by: Levi H. Evans
- Succeeded by: Hiram McCullough

Personal details
- Born: c. 1800/1801 Lancaster County, Pennsylvania, U.S.
- Died: August 2, 1884
- Resting place: Presbyterian Church; Elkton, Maryland, U.S.
- Party: Whig
- Occupation: Politician

George R. Howard (c. 1800/1801 – August 2, 1884) was an American politician from Maryland. He served as a member of the Maryland Senate, representing Cecil County, from 1840 to 1845.

== Early life ==
George R. Howard was born in 1800 or 1801 in Lancaster County, Pennsylvania.

== Career ==
Howard was a Whig prior to the Civil War. He served as a member of the Maryland Senate, representing Cecil County, from 1840 to 1845. In 1845, he was appointed by Governor Pratt as register of wills in Cecil County. He remained in that role until the Maryland constitution of 1851.

During the war, Howard was a member of the Union Party. He was elected as colonel of the 6th Maryland Regiment. He was an active member of the service for about a year or more. After leaving the army, Howard returned to his farm at Elk Neck. He then moved to Elkton. In 1867, he was elected a member of the constitutional convention of Maryland. He was appointed deputy collector of internal revenue. He then served as justice of the peace until he left the role after becoming sick around 1880.

== Personal life ==
Around 1880, Howard suffered a stroke of paralysis. Howard died on August 2, 1884. He was buried at the Presbyterian Church in Elkton.
