= Nicholas Thomas (politician) =

American politician

2nd Speaker of the Maryland House of Delegates
- In office 1777
- In office 1777–1778
- Governor: Thomas Johnson
- Preceded by: Thomas S. Wootton
- Succeeded by: William Fitzhugh

Personal details
- Born: c. 1737
- Died: 1784

Nicholas Thomas (c. 1737–1784) was an American lawyer and politician who served as the second Speaker of the Maryland House of Delegates. A native of Talbot County, Thomas was the son of William Thomas, a prominent resident of the County and a member of the provincial legislature from 1738 to 1748, and Elizabeth Allen. Thomas had a sister, Mary, who married into the prominent Golsborough family, and three brothers, John Allen, William, and James. John Allen would go on to serve alongside Nicholas in the Annapolis Convention and as an officer in the American Revolution.

== Career ==
Nicholas was a lawyer by profession, first being admitted to the bar in Talbot and Queen Anne's Counties in 1759, and later was admitted in a number of other counties and at the provincial court.

He was elected to the lower house of the provincial assembly representing Talbot for the 1768-1770 legislative session and then again for the 1771 and the 1773-1774 sessions. These sessions were characterized by colonial opposition to the imposition of taxes by parliament and to resisting efforts by proprietary governors Horatio Sharpe and Robert Eden to proclaim new fees for civil offices.

In 1774, Thomas was elected to serve at the first Annapolis Convention, which governed Maryland during the early years of the American Revolution in opposition to Governor Eden, and he would go on to serve at the 4th through 8th conventions as well. These conventions, in addition to establishing the continuation of civil government, sent representatives to the Continental Congress, established a militia structure for the state, and established a Council of Safety which would oversee the government during recesses in the Annapolis Convention. It was not until 1776, however, that the Conventions formally rejected a call for new elections by Governor Eden, who then left the province, bringing to an end nearly 150 years of colonial rule. Thomas was not a member of the convention that wrote the new state constitution for Maryland, but he was appointed a member of the Council of Safety by that convention.

Thomas also served briefly as Quartermaster General of the 4th battalion of the Talbot County Militia. Following the adoption of the Maryland Constitution of 1776, he was again elected by Talbot County to a vacancy in the legislature, in the lower house of the new Maryland General Assembly, the House of Delegates. Following the resignation of the first Speaker of that body, Thomas S. Wootton, three days after Thomas was elected to the body, he was selected by his peers to serve as Speaker.

During his time as Speaker, he presided over the establishment of the first Court of Appeals in Maryland and the adoption of the full text of the United States Declaration of Independence into the proceedings of the House. He served as Speaker for a year until his resignation from the House of Delegates in favor of service as an Associate Judge on the General Court of Maryland. As a member of that court, Thomas helped oversee the declaration that a number of prominent Marylanders had committed high treason by staying loyal to Great Britain, and ordered the confiscation of their property.

He did not live long past the signing of the treaty concluding the American Revolutionary War, dying in late 1783 or early 1784. While he owned 73 acres of land upon his original election, by the time of his death he was no longer a landowner. Thomas never married or had children, and upon his death his remaining assets we bequeathed upon his housekeeper Esther Skinner, his brother James, and his nephew Nicholas Goldsborough.
