= History of Montgomery County, Maryland =

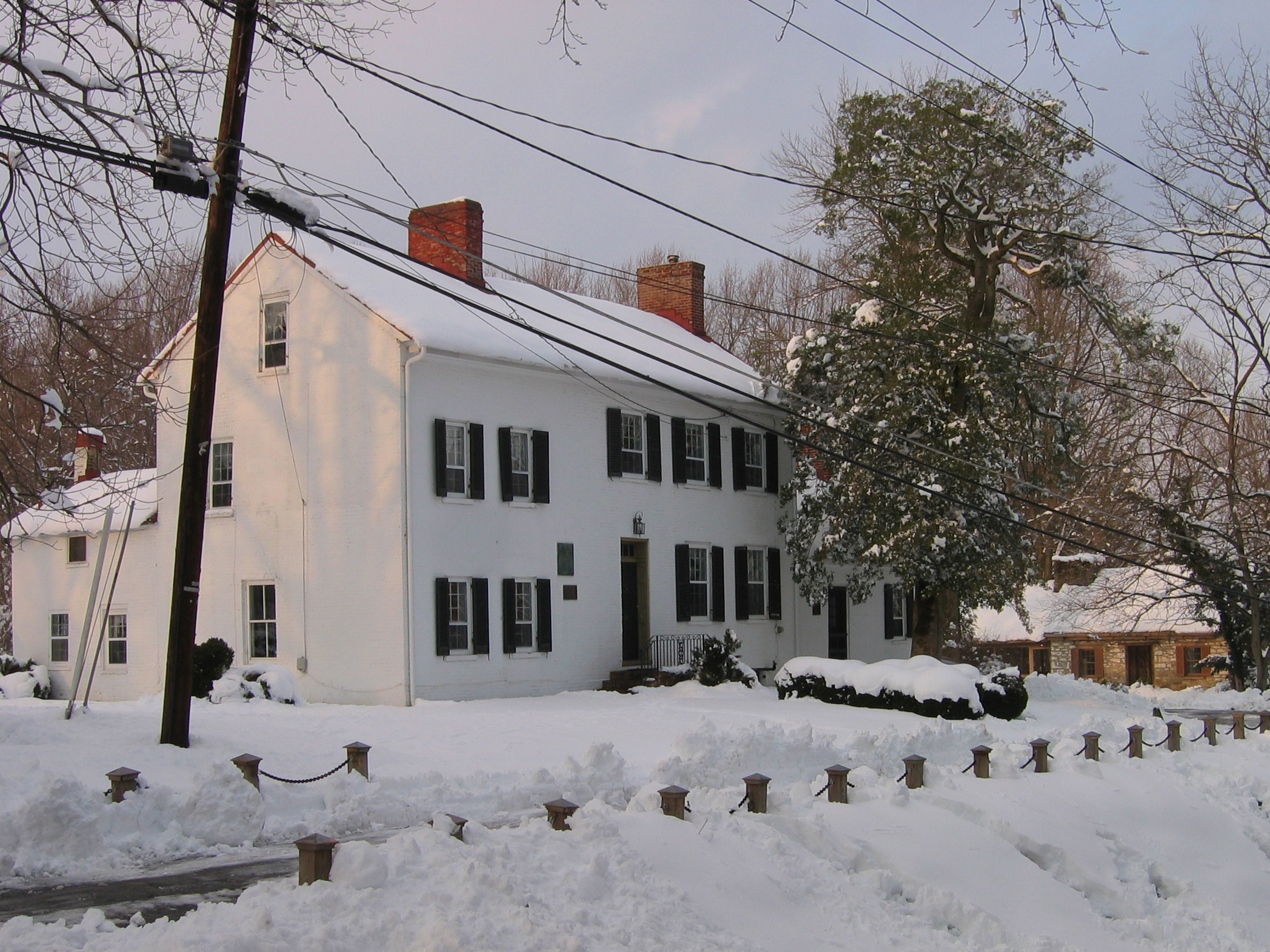
The Madison House in Brookeville, originally owned by Caleb Bentley, provided refuge for President James Madison, on August 26, 1814, after the Burning of Washington by the British during the War of 1812.

The history of Montgomery County, Maryland begins prior to 1688 when the first tract of land in what is now Montgomery County was granted by Charles I in a charter to the first Lord Baltimore (head of the Calvert family). Much later, the creation of Montegomery county became the goal of colonist, Thomas S. Wootton when, on August 31, 1776, he introduced a measure to form a new county from Frederick County, Maryland to aid area residents in simplifying their business affairs. The measure passed, thus creating the new political entity of Montegomery County in the Maryland Colony.

== Early history ==
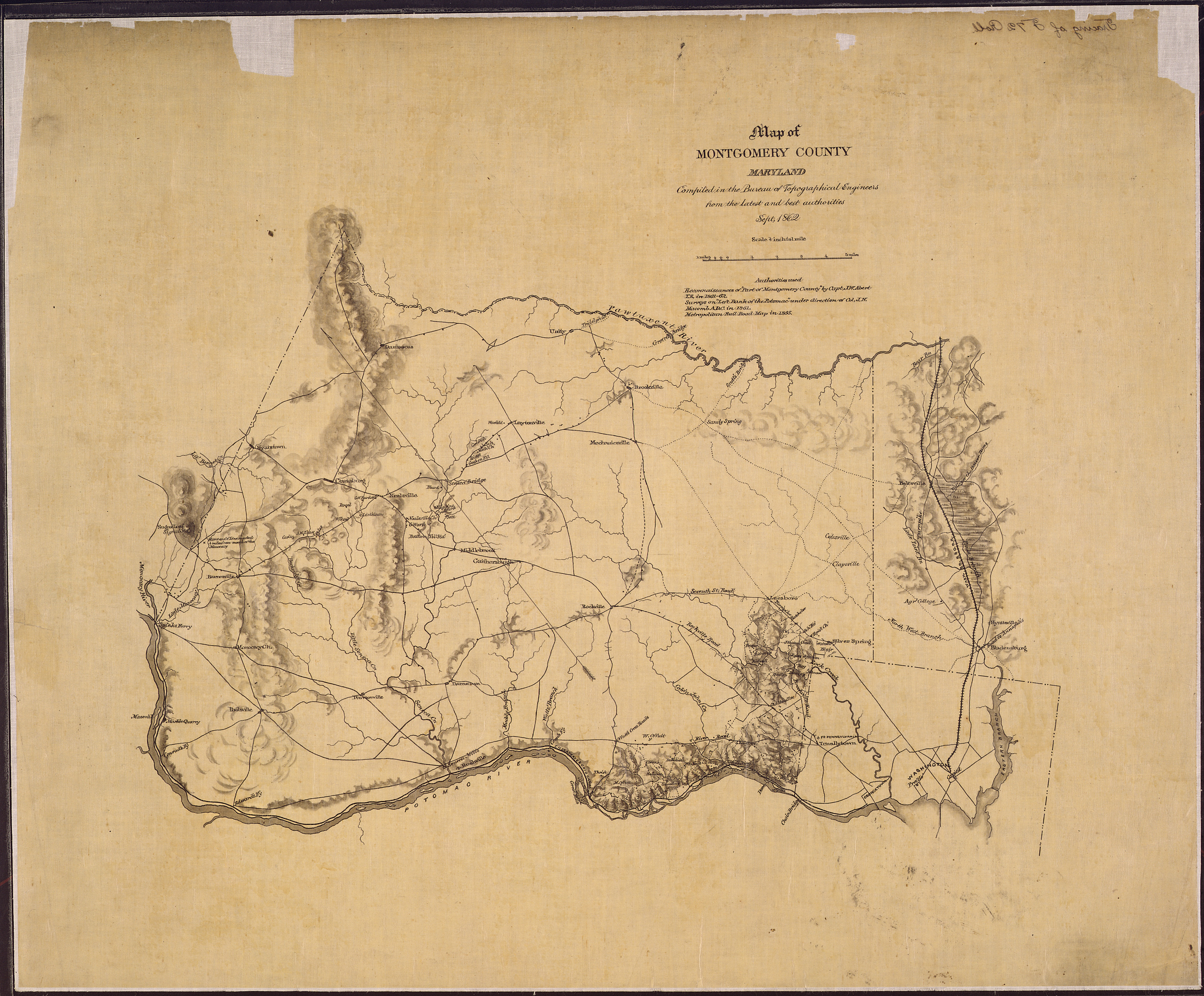
A September 1862 map of Montgomery County

Before European colonization, the land now known as Montgomery County was covered in a vast swath of forest crossed by the creeks and small streams that feed the Potomac and Patuxent rivers. A few small villages of the Piscataway, members of the Algonquian people, were scattered across the southern portions of the county. North of the Great Falls of the Potomac, there were few permanent settlements, and the Piscataway shared hunting camps and foot paths with members of rival peoples like the Susquehannocks and the Senecas.

Captain John Smith of the English settlement at Jamestown was probably the first European to explore the area, during his travels along the Potomac River and throughout the Chesapeake region.

These lands were claimed by Europeans for the first time when George Calvert, 1st Baron Baltimore was granted the charter for the colony of Maryland by Charles I of England. In 1688, the first tract of land in what is now Montgomery County was granted by the Calvert family to an individual colonist, a wealthy and prominent early Marylander named Henry Darnall. He and other early claimants had no intention of settling their families. They were little more than speculators, securing grants from the colonial leadership and then selling their lands in pieces to settlers.

== 18th century ==
Around 1715, the first British settlers began building farms and plantations in the area.

These earliest settlers were English or Scottish immigrants from other portions of Maryland, German settlers moving down from Pennsylvania, or Quakers who came to settle on land granted to a convert named James Brooke in what is now Brookeville. Most of these early settlers were small farmers, growing wheat and a variety of other subsistence crops in addition to the region's main cash crop, tobacco. Many of the farmers owned slaves. They transported the tobacco they grew to market through the Potomac River port of Georgetown. Sparsely settled, the area's farms and taverns were nonetheless of strategic importance as access to the interior. General Edward Braddock's army traveled through the county on the way to its disastrous defeat at Fort Duquesne during the French and Indian War.

Like other regions of the North American colonies, the region that is now Montgomery County saw protests against British taxation in the years before the American Revolution. In 1774, local residents met at Hungerford's Tavern and agreed to break off commerce with Great Britain. Following the signing of the Declaration of Independence, representatives of the area helped to draft the new state constitution and began to build a Maryland free of proprietary control.

=== Founding ===
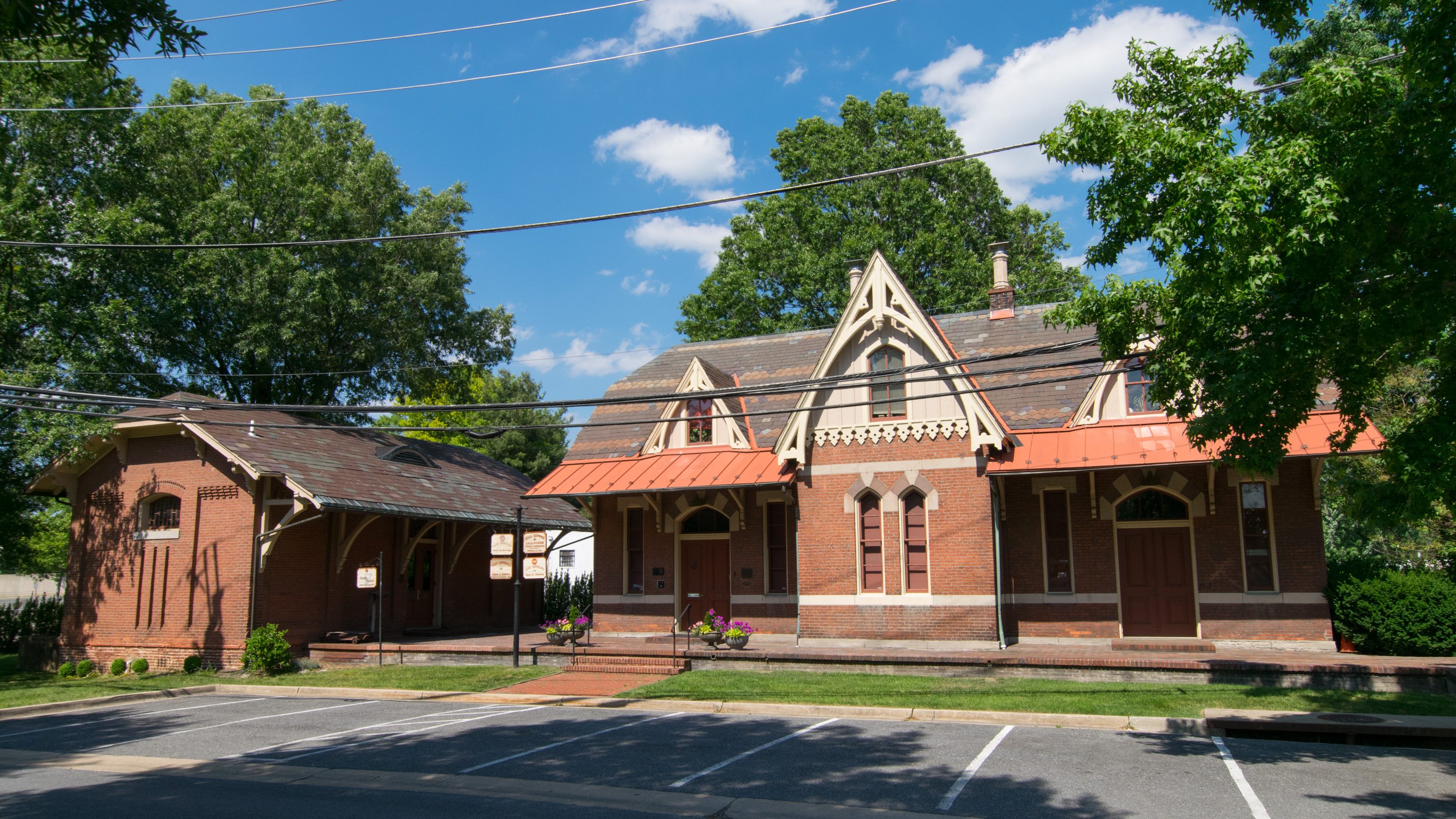
The Rockville Railroad Station in Rockville, Maryland in 2017

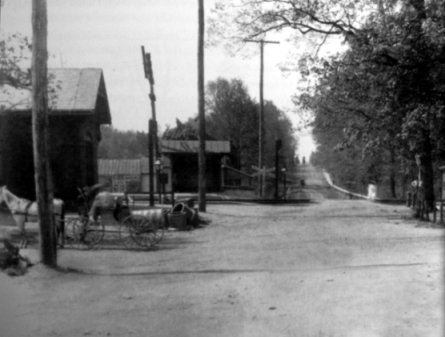
Summit Avenue in Gaithersburg, Maryland in the early 1900s

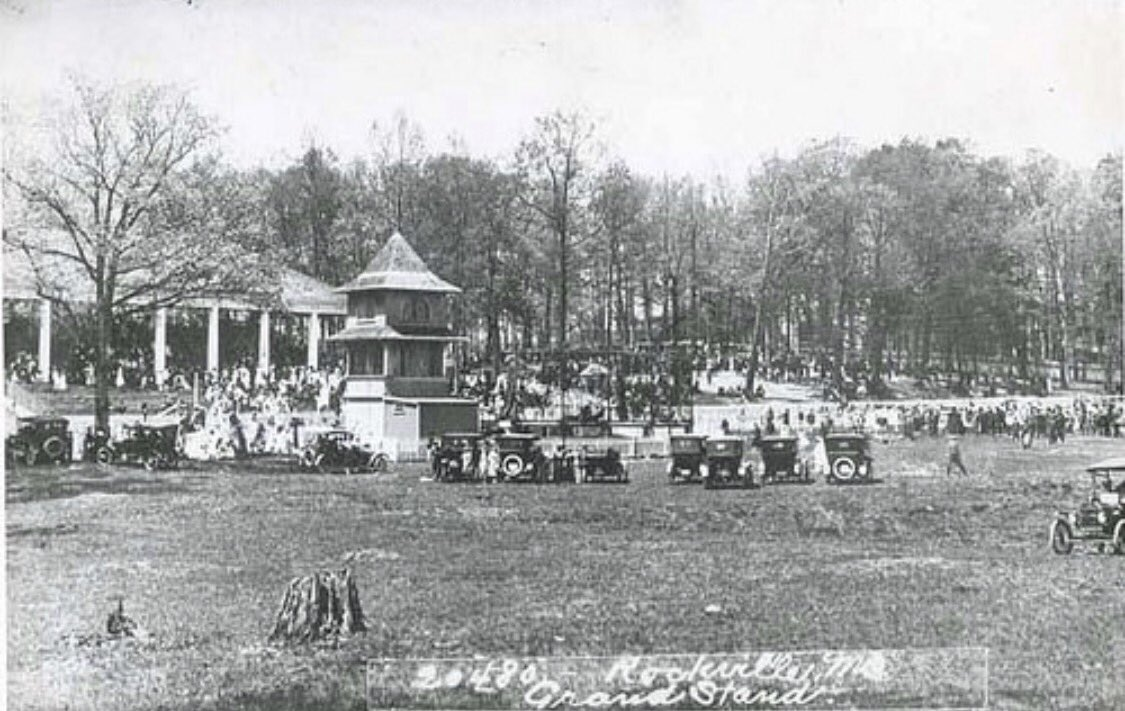
The Montgomery County Fair in Rockville, Maryland in 1917

By 1776, there was a growing movement to form a new, strong U.S. federal government, with each of the Thirteen Colonies retaining the authority to govern its local affairs. Member of the Maryland Constitutional Convention Thomas S. Wootton thought that dividing large Frederick County into three counties, each governed by elected representatives, would result in greater self-government.

When Wootton discussed his idea with the residents of southern Frederick County, the residents supported his idea for a different reason. At some point, almost everyone had needed to travel to the courthouse in Frederick Town, and the travel cost and time was prohibitive. The residents wanted a county courthouse to be located closer to them.

On August 31, 1776, Wootton introduced a measure to form a new county from the southern portion of Frederick County.

Resolved, That after the first day of October, next, such part of the said county of Frederick as is contained within the bounds and limits following, to wit: beginning at the east side of the mouth of Rock Creek, on the Potomac River, and running thence with the said river to the mouth of Monocacy, then with a straight line to Parr's Spring, from thence with the lines of the county to the beginning shall be and is hereby erected into a new county called Montgomery County.

Wootton proposed naming the new county after the well-known Major General Richard Montgomery, who had served in the Continental Army during the American Revolutionary War. Eight months earlier, Montgomery had died in Quebec City while attempting an ultimately unsuccessful invasion of the Province of Quebec. Montgomery had never actually set foot on the land that would bear his name.

Wootton also proposed forming a new county from the northwestern portion of Frederick County, named Washington County, named after another well-known leader of the Continental Army during the American Revolutionary War, General George Washington.

Several members of the Maryland Continental Convention opposed Wootton's proposal, and it was tabled. Six days later, Wootton pressed for his proposal again, and it passed by a slim majority. As a result, Montgomery County came into existence on October 1, 1776.

In 1777, the leaders of the new county chose as their county seat an area adjacent to Hungerford's Tavern near the center of the county, which became Rockville in 1801. When deciding its name, the original idea was to call it Wattsville, after Watts Branch, a stream that runs through the land. Because Watts Branch is a small stream, the idea was reconsidered, and the area was ultimately named Rockville after the nearby and larger Rock Creek.

For tax purposes, Montgomery County was divided into eleven districts, called hundreds. The names and areas of each hundred carried over from when the area was still part of Frederick County. The eleven districts were:

- Linganor Hundred (now Clarksburg, Damascus, and Hyattstown);
- Upper Newfoundland Hundred (Brookeville, Laytonsville, Olney, Sandy Spring);
- Lower Newfoundland Hundred (Ashton, Brighton, Burtonsville);
- Rock Creek Hundred (Colesville, Layhill, Norbeck);
- Northwest Hundred (Kensington, Wheaton, Silver Spring, Takoma Park);
- Lower Potomac Hundred (Bethesda, Chevy Chase, Georgetown);
- Middle Potomac Hundred (Potomac, Rockville);
- Upper Potomac Hundred (Darnestown, Dawsonville, Seneca);
- Seneca Hundred (Gaithersburg);
- Sugar Loaf Hundred (Barnesville, Beallsville, Germantown);
- Sugarland Hundred (Poolesville).

The first court was held at Hungerford's Tavern on May 20, 1777. Court was held by Charles Jones, Samuel W. Magruder, Elisha Williams, William Deakins, Richard Thompson, James Offutt, and Edward Burgess, with Brook Beall as clerk. Clement Beall served as the county's first sheriff. The county's first courthouse was built soon thereafter, and the court was held at the new courthouse beginning in 1779.

According to the 1790 census, the county's first, 18,000 people lived in the county, of which about 35 percent were black.

Montgomery County supplied arms, food, and forage for the Continental Army during the Revolution, in addition to soldiers.

In 1791, portions of Montgomery County, including Georgetown, were ceded to form the new District of Columbia, along with portions of Prince George's County, Maryland, as well as parts of Virginia that were later returned to Virginia.

== 19th century ==
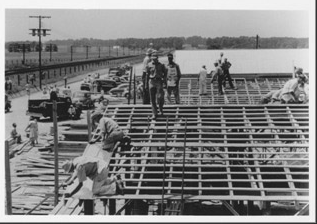
Volunteers build livestock exhibit pens at the new Montgomery County Fair site in Gaithersburg, Maryland on June 4, 1949.

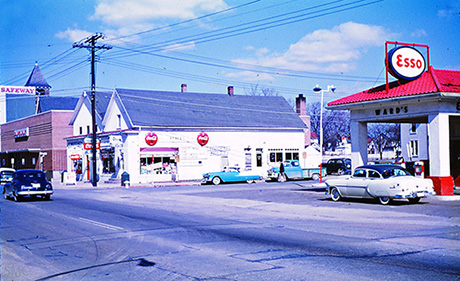
Downtown Gaithersburg, Maryland in February 1956

In 1828, construction on the Chesapeake and Ohio Canal commenced and was completed in 1850. Laborers were primarily Irish immigrants. Throughout the 19th century, agriculture dominated the economy in Montgomery County, with slaves playing a significant role, though the vast majority of farmers owned ten slaves or fewer rather than large plantations. In the first half of the 19th century, low tobacco prices and worn-out soil caused many tobacco farms to be abandoned. Crop production gradually shifted away from tobacco and toward wheat and corn. Prior to the Civil War, Montgomery County allied itself with other slaveholding counties in southern Maryland and the Eastern Shore. Montgomery County was important in the abolitionist movement, especially among the Quakers in the northern part of the county near Sandy Spring. Josiah Henson grew up as a slave on the Riley farm south of Rockville. He wrote about his experiences in a memoir which became the basis for Harriet Beecher Stowe's Uncle Tom's Cabin (1852). A slave cabin where he is believed to have spent time still stands at the end of a driveway off Old Georgetown Road.

Until 1860, only private schools existed in Montgomery County. Initially, schools for European-American students were built. A school in Rockville for free African Americans existed until 1866. Another school for African Americans was opened by 1877 in Rockville.

Montgomery County's proximity to the nation's capital and split sympathies to North and South resulted in it being occupied by Union forces during the Civil War. The county was "invaded" on multiple occasions by Confederate and Union forces.

In 1855, work on the Metropolitan Branch of the Baltimore and Ohio Railroad began, in order to provide a route between Washington, D.C., and Point of Rocks, Maryland. In 1873, the railroad opened. The railroad spurred development at Takoma Park, Silver Spring, Kensington, Garrett Park and Chevy Chase. By providing a much-needed transportation link, it also greatly increased the value of farmland and spurred the development of a dairy industry in the county.

Formerly enslaved African Americans formed the community of Emory Grove in 1864.

During the Jim Crow era, masked mobs of local white men carried out two separate lynchings of African-American men in Montgomery County on Rockville's courthouse lawn. John Diggs was violently lynched in 1880 and Sydney Randolph similarly murdered in 1896. Neither man was found guilty in a court of law, nor was anyone punished for the lynchings. No memorial exists for victims of Montgomery County's lynchings.

== 20th century ==
In 1913, the United Daughters of the Confederacy donated a statue of a Confederate soldier to the county, part of the group's effort to promote the pseudohistorical Lost Cause ideology and corresponding white supremacy. County officials erected the statue on the courthouse lawn where the 1890 and 1896 lynchings took place, declaring that it was appropriate to display a monument to people who took up arms against the United States because Montgomery County, like the rest of Maryland, was divided over the issue of secession. (One vocal sociologist has disputed this claim, arguing that the county's residents were not, by and large, welcoming of the Confederates during the Civil War.) The statue was maintained by the Maryland Historical Society as a monument to the Confederate army as "heroes of the thin grey line".

Law enforcement duties rested in the Montgomery County Sheriff and designated constables until on July 1, 1922, when the Montgomery County Police Department was established with three to six officers appointed to two-year terms by the Board of County Commissioners, one of whom would be appointed as Chief. In 1927, the police department was enlarged to 20 officers.

The remains of F. Scott Fitzgerald, author of the novel The Great Gatsby, are interred at St. Mary's Catholic Church Cemetery in Rockville.

=== Home rule ===
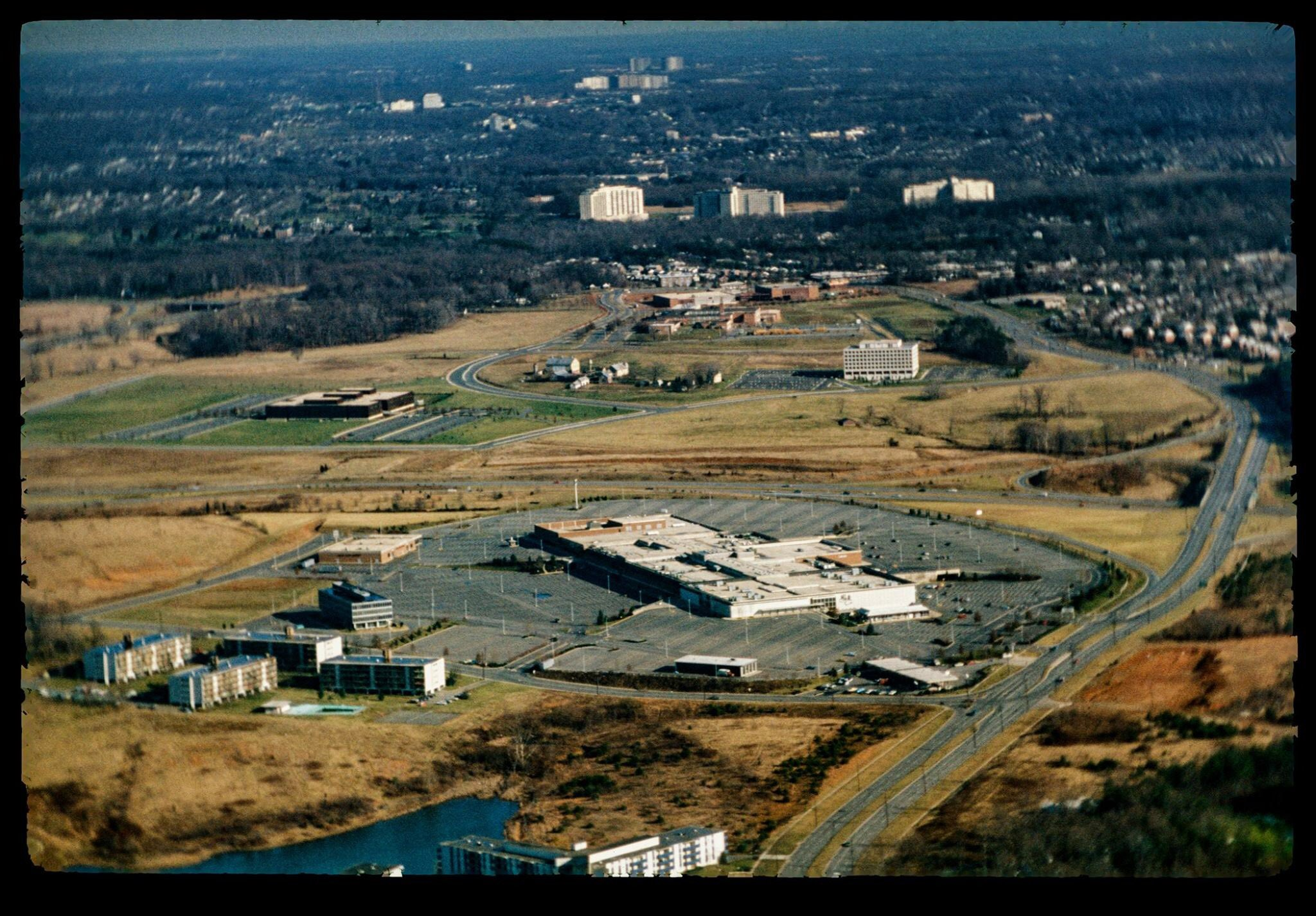
Westfield Montgomery Montgomery Mall in Bethesda, Maryland in 1973

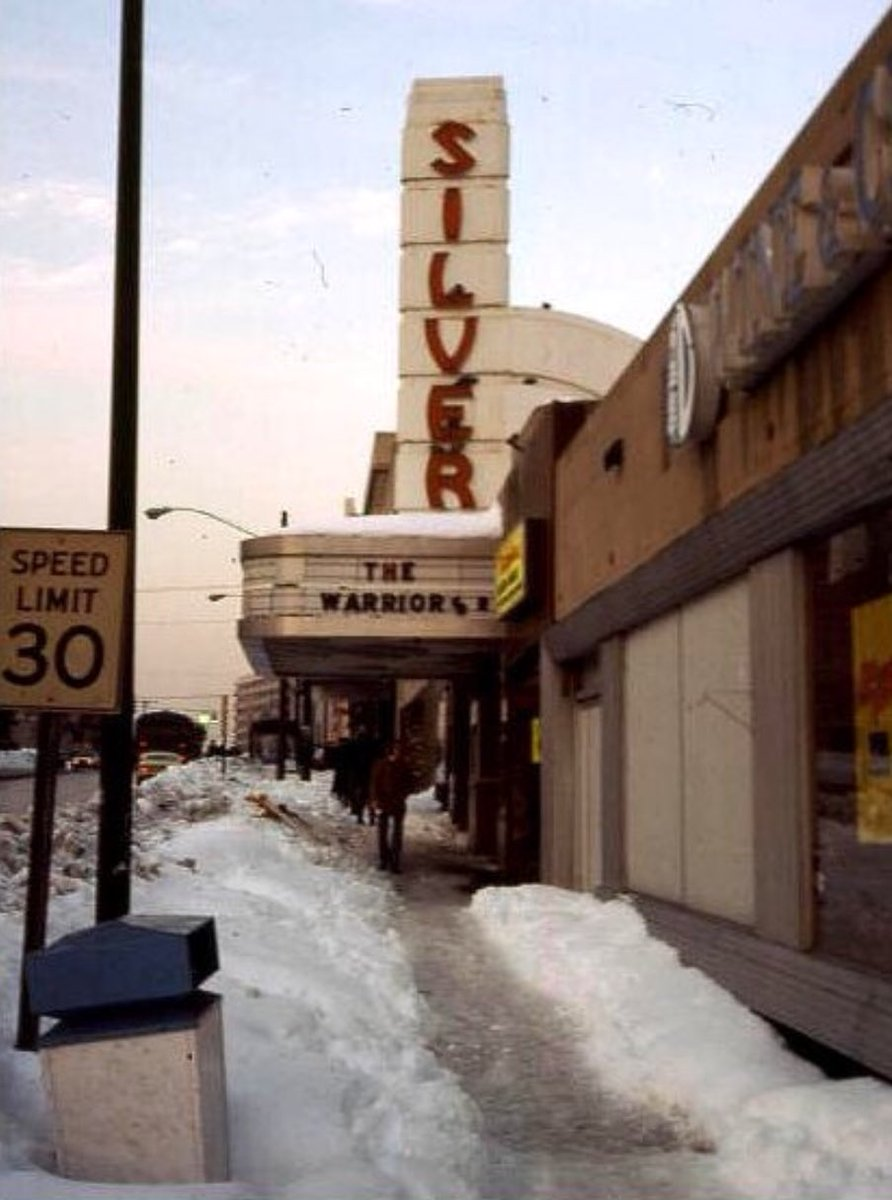
Silver Theater in Silver Spring, Maryland in 1979

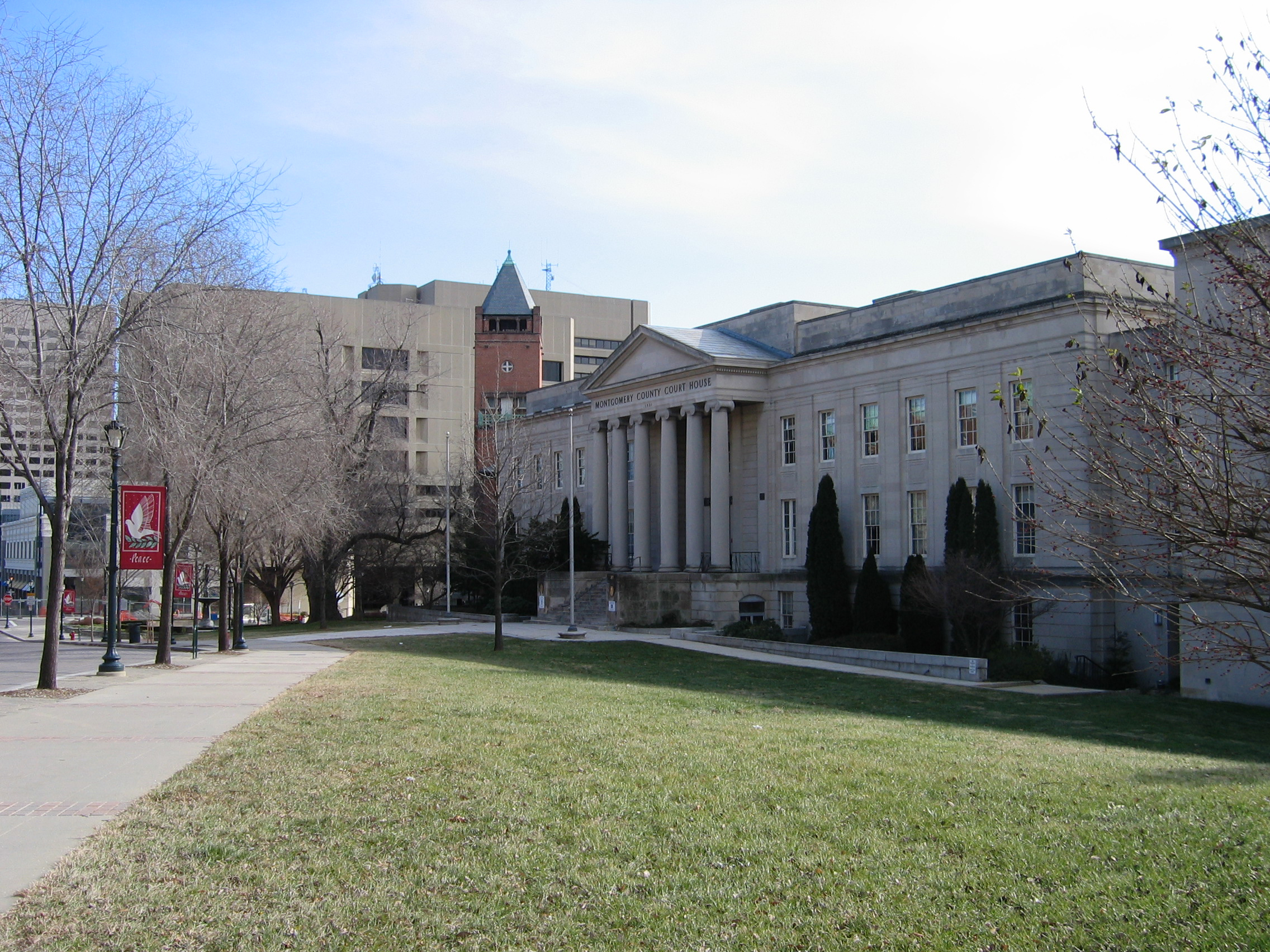
The former Montgomery County Courthouse in Rockville, Maryland, which served as the county courthouse from 1931 to 1982; the building now houses a state district court after the county court was moved to the Montgomery County Judicial Center.

The county began with most legislative power in the hands of the Maryland state government, with a five-person Montgomery County Board of Commissioners who oversaw the administration of the county but could neither pass county laws nor enact policies.

In 1915, Maryland amended its constitution. According to the constitutional amendment, a county's residents may propose a petition to create a nonpartisan Charter Board. If the petition receives signatures from at least twenty percent of the county's registered voters, all county residents would vote to select the members of the Charter Board during the next general election. The Charter Board would be authorized to draft a new system of county government, which could include a county council with the power to enact legislation and policies. The Charter Board's proposal would then be voted upon by registered voters during the following general election, and it would be enacted if approved by the voters.

In 1930, two-thirds of Arlington County, Virginia residents voted to appoint a county manager, inspiring activists in Montgomery County to advocate for the same. In 1935, a group of farmers meeting in Sandy Spring decided that Montgomery County needed a new form of governance. The farmers were in favor of a professional county manager and a home-rule charter for Montgomery County.

In 1936, the Montgomery County Civic Federation announced its support for a home-rule charter, a merit system for Montgomery County's employees, and a comptroller to administer the county's finances. The following year, the Montgomery County Civic Federation appointed Woodside Park resident Allen H. Gardener to head a committee to study the reorganization of the Montgomery County's government. The committee recommended massive changes and, in February 1938, the Montgomery County Civic Federation passed a resolution urging the Montgomery County commissioners to engage a professional group to study the county's government.

In October 1938, the Montgomery County Commissioners held a public hearing on the proposal. The Commissioners decided to authorize a study of the existing county government structure with the goal of suggesting recommendations. In November 1938, the Commissioners selected the Brookings Institution for Government Research to conduct the study. The 720-page report opined that the county had outgrown its form of government.

The Brookings Institution's study recommended the creation of a nonpartisan county council consisting of nine members representing defined districts of the county who could pass legislation, determine policy, and control over the administration of the county. The county should hire a county administrator, create an independent comptroller in charge of county finances, consolidate welfare services, and establish a three-member non-political civil service commission. Black children deserved better schools, and all children should receive military training and learn about democracy. The Liquor Control Board should be abolished, and the county should hire a full-time attorney rather than retain multiple part-time legal advisers. A professional consultant should reassess taxes, and the tax rate should be increased enough to retire the county's debt. The Montgomery County Civic Federation praised the study for its comprehensiveness.

The county commissioners appointed a citizen's committee to determine how to enact the study's recommendations. The county commissioners strongly criticized the recommendation to create a county council, both because the council would be nonpartisan and because each county resident would be able to vote for only one representative rather than for all nine. Implementing some of the recommendations weeks later, the county commissioners appointed a permanent Board of Assessors, reorganized the Welfare Board, hired the a County Attorney and a purchasing agent, and hired sixteen police officers.

In 1942, Montgomery County Charter Committee was organized, which was formed primarily to circulate petitions to form a Charter Board. The Charter Board petitioned to form a county council with the power to pass laws without the consent of the Maryland General Assembly and with authority over the administration the county. While the Democratic Party did not explicitly denounce the charter, it issued a statement calling out the ostensibly nonpartisan movement for hidden partisan goals and claimed that backers of the charter petition for their alleged personal and political attacks on the Democratic Party and its officials. The newly formed Independent Party endorsed the charter, praising county residents' goal of improving their form of government. In the November 1942 election, county residents voted in favor of forming a Charter Board.

In 1943, the Charter Board released its draft charter. The council would have nine unpaid members, of which five would represent each of five single-member districts and four would represent the county at-large. Council seats would be nonpartisan, each seat would be held for four years, and elections would occur every two years. The council would have the power to enact legislation and hire a county manager, to whom all governmental department heads would report. All sessions of the council would be open to the public. The office of county treasurer would be abolished and replaced by a director of finance, who would be responsible for assessment and collection of taxes, assessments, and licenses, custody and disbursement of public funds and property, and preparation of monthly financial statements. A department of public works, department of education, department of safety, department of welfare, and department of health would also be created.

The Montgomery County Charter Board opened its campaign headquarters in Bethesda, to serve as an information center regarding the draft charter. The Charter Board emphasized that the draft charter would allow for county affairs to be decided by local representatives rather than by a vote of members of the Maryland General Assembly who represent citizens of all parts of the state. Another group opposing the draft charter opened its headquarters in Bethesda. The group said there was no good reason to abolish the functional state-level system already in place, and that the draft charter would increase taxes and establish heads of governmental agencies with indefinite terms who are not directly accountable to the public. The group also said that making the council seats nonpartisan would go against the country's political history. The editorial board of The Washington Post supported the draft charter. The Montgomery County League of Women Voters also endorsed the draft charter.

In a near-record turnout, a 1946 vote to enact a home-rule charter failed by a vote of 14,471 to 13,270. Following the vote, proponents of the charter said they would not give up the fight.

Several months later, Montgomery County Democratic Party leader Col. E. Brooke Lee said he would support Montgomery County home rule by way of an act of the Maryland state legislature. Lee proposed a bill to create a position of county supervisor, who would be in charge of routine county business, would appoint county employees subject to civil service rules and regulations, would supervise expenditures, and would prepare the operating and capital budgets. The bill did not disband the county commissioners or create a county council. The bill passed the state legislature and was signed by Governor Herbert R. O'Conor in 1945. The county commissioners appointed Willard F. Day to the position.

In 1948, by a vote of 17,809 in favor and 13,752 against, voters approved a charter for a "Council-Manager" form of government, making Montgomery County the first home-rule county in Maryland. The charter created an elected seven-member County Council with the power to pass local laws. All seven Council Members would be elected at-large by all county residents. Five would have to live in five different residence districts, while the other two could live anywhere within the county. The Council would serve as both the legislative and executive functions of the county. Council members would elect one of their own to serve as president of the Council. The charter also authorized the hiring of a county manager, the top administrative official, who could be dismissed by the Council after a public hearing. The charter created a department of public works, department of finance, and office of the county attorney, while it abolished the positions of county treasurer and police commissioner. The first County Council was elected in 1949.

In 1958, the county enacted an urban renewal ordinance requiring all homes to have water and sewage lines. The policy displaced at least 112 households in the historically Black community of Emory Grove.

=== Adoption of county executive system ===
In 1962, a county civic group advocated for the election of a county executive. The group's report said that the new position would give citizens another place to go if their concerns were refused by the Montgomery County Council. The group said that the fact that the county had four appointed county managers in thirteen years demonstrates that establishing the position in 1948 had not been a stunning success. The group also advocated for nonpartisan elections for council members. Among the reasons for the suggested changes in governance is the fact that the county's population had more than doubled since the governmental system had been established in 1948.

In 1966, the Montgomery County Council adopted a proposed charter amendment to create a new elected position of County Executive. Elected to a four-year term, the County Executive could veto legislation passed by the County Council, although five members of the County Council could vote to overrule the veto. All Council Members would continue to be at-large, but they would need to live in seven different residence districts. Republicans favored a referendum on the proposed charter amendment, while Democrats favored it in principle but urged the specific amendment's defeat because the duties of the County Executive were not specific enough. In the referendum held in September 1966, the referendum was defeated, with 57 percent of voters opposed.

In February 1967, the Montgomery County Council formed a commission to draft a charter amendment to elect a county executive. The commission's plan was to separate the legislative and executive functions of government. The county council would continue to be the legislative branch of county government, and an elected full-time County Executive who could veto legislation passed by the Council; it would take five votes by the Council to override a veto. The County Executive would hire a chief administrative officer to supervise the daily operations of the government. All Council Members would be elected at-large by all county residents, but five of the seven would need to live in each of five different residential districts of substantially equal population. In November 1968, the charter amendment was approved, with 53 percent of votes in favor.

In the first election for County Executive, held in 1970, Republican James P. Gleason defeated Democrat William W. Greenhalgh by a margin of 420 votes.

In November 1986, voters amended the Charter to increase the number of Council seats in the 1990 election from seven to nine. Now, five members are elected by the voters of their council district and four are elected at-large. Each voter may vote for five council members; four at-large and one from the district in which they reside.

=== Annexation ===
In November 1995, the City of Takoma Park held a state-sponsored referendum asking whether the portions of the city in Prince George's County should be annexed to Montgomery County or vice versa. The majority of votes in the referendum were in favor of unification of the entire city in Montgomery County. Following subsequent approval by both counties' councils and the Maryland General Assembly, the county line was moved to include the entire city into Montgomery County (including territory in Prince George's County newly annexed by the city) on July 1, 1997. This added about 800 residents to Montgomery County's population.

== 21st century ==
In November 2020, voters amended the Charter to increase the total number of Council seats in the 2022 election from nine to eleven. Now, seven members are elected by the voters of their council district. The amount of at-large seats did not change. Each voter may vote for five council members; four at-large and one from the district in which they reside.

In 2015, Montgomery County Executive Isiah Leggett ordered that the Confederate statue be removed from Rockville's courthouse lawn. In February 2017, Montgomery County officials made a deal to move the statue to land owned by the operator of White's Ferry. The statue was moved to its new location in July 2017.

== See also ==
- National Register of Historic Places listings in Montgomery County, Maryland
