= William Hammond Marriott =

American politician

- Born: 1790
- Died: 1851 (aged 60–61)
- Education: St. John's College class of 1810
- Spouse: Jane McKim
- Children: John McKim, Richard McKim, Telfair/Telbair, William H. (-5 December 1830), Emily Grace, Margaret McKim, and William H. ( -May 13, 1851)
- Parent(s): Richard Davis Marriott, Sarah Hammond

William Hammond Marriott (1790 – 1851) was Speaker of the Maryland House of Delegates.

== Early life ==
Marriott was a grandson of John Marriott, an early Maryland pioneer on the Severn River. Shortly after graduating St. John's College in 1810, Marriott was elected to the Maryland House of Delegates where he served on the Grievances and Courts of Justice Committee through the opening of the War of 1812. During this time, Marriott built a log home on his plantation at Ivy Hill in Anne Arundel County. The location would later become Howard County, in the town of Marriottsville. Marriott formed the 8th Brigade of the Maryland Militia serving as a Brigade Major and Inspector. He served in the positions from 1812 to 7 January 1820.

From 1818 to 1822, Marriott was reelected to the House of Delegates, later becoming Speaker in the 1822 and 1824 sessions.

Marriott received a large undisclosed sum of money as an inheritance from his grandfather William Hammond including a slave named Hess Badger who was supposed to be manumitted, but remained a slave until Marriott's death. In an 1854 case appealing his will, Hess' son Sam Badger appealed for his freedom from Marriott's heirs, since he was born into slavery while Marriott owned his mother, who was supposed to have her freedom before his birth.

Marriott's law records are held at the New York Public Library archives.

== See also ==
- A History of the Adjutants General of Maryland - Fellow 8th Brigade members.
