= Otis Keilholtz =

American politician (1838–1883)

Speaker of the Maryland House of Delegates
- In office 1882
- Preceded by: Hiram McCullough
- Succeeded by: Joseph Pembroke Thom

Member of the Maryland House of Delegates
- In office 1882

Mayor of Baltimore (ex-officio)
- In office January 1878, June 1878
- Preceded by: George P. Kane
- Succeeded by: Ferdinand C. Latrobe

Personal details
- Born: February 8, 1838 Baltimore, Maryland, U.S.
- Died: September 13, 1883 (aged 45) Baltimore, Maryland, U.S.
- Resting place: New Cathedral Cemetery; Baltimore, Maryland, U.S.
- Party: Democratic
- Spouse: Emily
- Children: 5
- Education: Georgetown University; St. Mary's Seminary
- Occupation: Politician

Otis Keilholtz (February 8, 1838 – September 13, 1883) was an American politician. He served in the Baltimore City Council in the 1870s and served as ex-officio Mayor of Baltimore when Mayor George P. Kane was sick and after he died in office in 1878. Keilholtz served in the Maryland House of Delegates and as Speaker of the Maryland House of Delegates in 1882.

== Early life ==
Otis Keilholtz was born on February 8, 1838, at 92 North Greene Street in Baltimore. Keilholtz attended Baltimore City High School. He attended Georgetown University, but did not graduate. He then attended St. Mary's Seminary for two years.

== Career ==
Keilholtz served in the Fifth Regiment, Company H, of the Maryland National Guard.

Keilholtz was a Democrat. Keilholtz served in the Baltimore City Council, representing the thirteenth ward, from 1874 to 1875 and 1877 to 1879. He also served as president of the first branch of Baltimore City Council in 1877 and 1878. Keilholtz served as ex-officio Mayor of Baltimore in 1878 when Mayor George P. Kane was sick in January 1878 and after his death in June 1878. In 1882, Keilholtz served in the Maryland House of Delegates, representing Baltimore, and as Speaker of the Maryland House of Delegates. He also served as president of the board of visitors to the Baltimore City Jail.

== Personal life ==
Keilholtz married Emily. She was the first cousin of Louisiana Governor Samuel D. McEnery. She died in 1885. They had two sons and three daughters: Pierre, Otis, Adele, Claudia and Lydia.

Keilholtz was lifelong friends with Reverend Edward McColgan.

Keilholtz died of Bright's disease on September 13, 1883, at his house in Baltimore. He was buried at New Cathedral Cemetery (formerly Bonnie Brae Cemetery) in Baltimore.
