= John Hanson Briscoe =

Politician and judge

102 Speaker of the Maryland House of Delegates
- In office 1973–1979
- Preceded by: Thomas Hunter Lowe
- Succeeded by: Ben Cardin

Member of the Maryland House of Delegates
- In office 1962–1979

Personal details
- Born: April 10, 1934 Leonardtown, St. Mary's County, Maryland, U.S.
- Died: January 1, 2014 (aged 79) Hollywood, St. Mary's County, Maryland, U.S.
- Party: Democratic

John Hanson Briscoe (April 10, 1934 – January 1, 2014) was a Maryland politician and judge. A lifelong resident of St. Mary's County, he served as a member of the Maryland House of Delegates from 1962 to 1979, and served as Speaker of the House from 1973 to 1979. He then served as County Administrative Judge for St. Mary's County Circuit Court, from 1986 until his retirement in 2002.

Briscoe was born in Leonardtown, Maryland and attended St. Mary's Academy, in Leonardtown. After completing his A.B. at Mt. St. Mary's College in 1956 And LL.B at the University of Baltimore School of Law, 1960, he was admitted to the Maryland Bar in 1960 and returned to St. Mary's County to engage in the private practice of law.

Briscoe served on many commissions and boards, championing environmental and historical causes, including the historical St. Mary's City Commission, the St. Mary's County Historical Society, and the Historic Sotterley Foundation. Briscoe died in Hollywood, Maryland on January 1, 2014.

Briscoe's great-grandfather, Walter Hanson Stone Briscoe, owned the Sotterley Plantation from 1826 to 1910, afterwards selling it to Herbert Livingston Satterlee.
