= John G. Chapman =

American politician

Member of the U.S. House of Representatives from Maryland's 1st district
- In office March 4, 1845 – March 3, 1849
- Preceded by: John Causin
- Succeeded by: Richard Bowie

37th President of the Maryland Senate
- In office 1833–1836
- Preceded by: Thomas Sappington
- Succeeded by: Richard Thomas

Member of the Maryland Senate
- In office 1832–1836

31st, 33rd, and 46th Speaker of the Maryland House of Representatives
- In office 1844
- Preceded by: William H. Watson
- Succeeded by: William S. Waters
- In office December 1827 – December 1828
- Preceded by: James W. McCulloh
- Succeeded by: Francis Thomas
- In office 1826
- Preceded by: Benedict Joseph Semmes
- Succeeded by: James W. McCulloh

Member of the Maryland House of Delegates
- In office 1843–1844
- In office 1824–1832

Personal details
- Born: John Grant Chapman; July 5, 1798 La Plata, Maryland, U.S.
- Died: December 10, 1856 (aged 58) Charles County, Maryland, U.S.
- Children: Andrew G. Chapman
- Education: Yale College

John Grant Chapman (July 5, 1798 – December 10, 1856) was an American politician.

Chapman was born in La Plata, Maryland, and was tutored at home. He attended a college in Pennsylvania in 1812 and 1813, and graduated from Yale College in 1817. He studied law, was admitted to the bar in 1819, and commenced practice at Port Tobacco, Maryland. He also held an interest in agricultural pursuits.

Chapman served as a member of the Maryland House of Delegates from 1824 to 1832 and from 1843 to 1844, serving as Speaker of the House from 1826 to 1829 and again in 1844. He served as a member of the Maryland State Senate from 1832 to 1836, and served as President of the Senate from 1833 to 1836. He also served in the State militia, and was an unsuccessful candidate for Governor of Maryland in 1844.

In 1844 and 1846, Chapman was elected as a Whig to the Twenty-ninth and Thirtieth Congresses, serving from March 4, 1845 to March 3, 1849. During the Thirtieth Congress, he served as chairman of the Committee on the District of Columbia.

After his tenure in Congress, Chapman resumed the practice of law at Port Tobacco, and served as president of the State constitutional convention in 1851. Chapman died at his sister’s estate, "Waverly", on the Wicomico River in Charles County, Maryland, and was initially interred at St. Johns, a family estate. He was re-interred later in Mount Rest Cemetery of La Plata, Maryland.

Chapman was father of Andrew Grant Chapman, another Maryland Congressman.

Political offices
Preceded by Benedict J. Semmes	Speaker of the Maryland House of Delegates; 1826	Succeeded by James W. McCulloh
Preceded by James W. McCulloh	Speaker of the Maryland House of Delegates; 1827–1829	Succeeded by Francis Thomas
Preceded by Thomas Sappington	President of the Maryland State Senate; 1833–1836	Succeeded by Richard Thomas
Preceded by William H. Watson	Speaker of the Maryland House of Delegates; 1844	Succeeded by William S. Waters
U.S. House of Representatives
Preceded by John Causin	Member of the U.S. House of Representatives from Maryland's 1st congressional district March 4, 1845 – March 3, 1849	Succeeded by Richard Bowie
