= George Franklin Pawling =

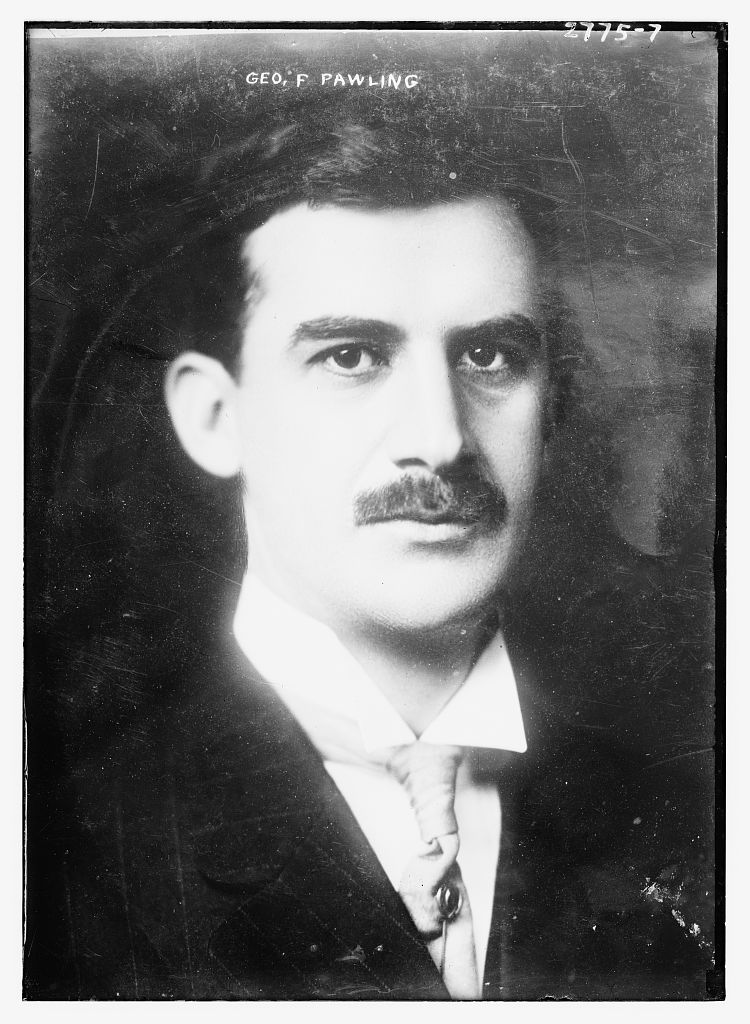

President of the Amateur Athletic Union
- In office 1910–1911
- Succeeded by: Gustavus Town Kirby

Personal details
- Born: April 16, 1879 Lewistown, Pennsylvania
- Died: December 2, 1954 (aged 75) Philadelphia, Pennsylvania

George Franklin Pawling (April 16, 1879 - December 2, 1954), was President of the Amateur Athletic Union in the 1910s and the builder of the Philadelphia Arena in the 1920s.

== Biography ==
Pawling was born on April 16, 1879, in Lewistown, Pennsylvania. He attended the Central Manual Training School of Philadelphia and graduated in 1896. He went to work for the Pencoyd Iron Works from 1896 to 1900, taking courses in their School of Instruction in Engineering. He studied engineering in Temple College in Philadelphia. He then worked for the New York Shipbuilding in 1901 to 1902 in charge of the detailing of hulls. From 1903 to 1905 he was the assistant engineer at the Philadelphia Rapid Transit Company where he designed the Market Street Elevated Railway.

From 1906 to 1907, he was a contracting engineer for the Belmont Iron Works.

== Death ==
He died on December 2, 1954, at Thomas Jefferson University Hospital in Philadelphia.
