= Thomas S. Wootton =

American politician (c. 1740 – 1789)

1st Speaker of the Maryland House of Delegates
- In office 1777
- Governor: Thomas Johnson
- Succeeded by: Nicholas Thomas

Personal details
- Born: Thomas Sprigg Wootton c. 1740
- Died: 1789
- Party: None

Dr. Thomas Sprigg Wootton (c. 1740 – 1789) was an American planter, physician, politician, and founding father who served as one of members of the Annapolis Convention, which governed Maryland in the early days of the American Revolution. Following the ratification of the Maryland Constitution of 1776, Wootton served as the first Speaker of the Maryland House of Delegates. Wootton is credited as the founder of Montgomery County and Washington County, Maryland, as he introduced a bill in the Maryland General Assembly on September 6, 1776, to split these now jurisdictions off from Frederick County. These were the first counties in America to be established by elected representatives rather than agents of the crown. The names of the new counties also broke with tradition in that they were named for the revolutionary leaders Richard Montgomery and George Washington, rather than for old world figures or place names. Wootton was a slave owner, originally inheriting enslaved persons from his father and later purchasing more. He also participated in the selling of enslaved people to the South. The Thomas S. Wootton High School in Rockville, Maryland is named after him.

== Personal life ==
Wootton's exact date of birth is unknown, though his place of birth was likely in Prince George's County, Maryland and he was of age by 1765. His father, Turner Wootton, was married twice prior to marrying Thomas' mother Elizabeth Sprigg, a not uncommon occurrence in colonial Maryland. He had at least four brothers, a sister, and a half-sister, though there may have been more siblings unaccounted for in the historical record. His father died around 1760, before Thomas came of age, and one of the few records of Turner's life is a deposition printed in the Maryland Gazette wherein he swore that no person had tried to persuade him to send Thomas to the European Catholic school St. Omer's.

He was literate, although it is not clear how he obtained his education, and by the time of his first accession to office he was a resident of an estate called "Discontent" in what is now Montgomery County. Records suggest that he married a woman named Mary Offut, who may have been murdered, and that he died without any surviving children. Upon his death, all of his assets including land and enslaved persons were bequeathed on his nephew, who like Wootton's father was named Turner.

== Political career ==
Wootton was first elected to office in 1769 as a member of the lower house of colonial government representing Frederick County, which at the time constituted much of western Maryland, including the modern Montgomery, Frederick, Washington, Allegany, and Garrett Counties. He would serve in that role for the 1769-1770 legislative session, then be re-elected for the 1771 and 1773-1774 sessions. In 1774, he was selected to participate in the first Annapolis Convention, representing Frederick County, and he went on to serve in a number of subsequent conventions. The last of these authored the Maryland Constitution of 1776 establishing a formal state government structure for the new state. Under that Constitution, Wootton was elected to the first House of Delegates of Maryland and was selected as the first Speaker of that body, though he resigned his speakership during that first session. He went on to serve in the same body, which at the time was elected annually, in 1779, 1780, 1783, 1784, and 1785.

His most prominent act as a member of the conventions and the House of Delegates was the successful effort to split Frederick County into three counties, pealing off Montgomery County where Wootton himself lived as well as Washington County, which included much of western Maryland and the modern-day Allegany and Garrett Counties. These were the first new counties created by an elected body in what became the United States, and the first to be named after revolutionary war heroes, in this case Richard Montgomery and George Washington. In addition, he worked to build a new market house in Frederick Town, a new church in Prince George's, and to expand poor relief.
