= Thomas Hunter Lowe =

American judge and politician

101 Speaker of the Maryland House of Delegates
- In office 1969–1973
- Preceded by: Marvin Mandel
- Succeeded by: John Hanson Briscoe

Member of the Maryland House of Delegates
- In office 1959–1973

Personal details
- Born: January 8, 1928 McDaniel, Talbot County, Maryland, U.S.
- Died: June 13, 1984 (aged 56) Easton, Talbot County, Maryland, U.S.
- Party: Democratic
- Education: Baltimore City College; Towson State Teachers College; Washington College; University of Maryland Law School

Thomas Hunter Lowe (January 8, 1928 – June 13, 1984) was Judge of the Maryland Court of Special Appeals (1973–1984), Speaker of the Maryland House of Delegates (1969–1973), and Delegate to the Maryland General Assembly (1958–1973). The Delegates' Office Building was named for him in 1973.

== Biography ==
Lowe was born in McDaniel, Maryland in 1928 to Louise Price and Denton Scott Lowe. He attended Baltimore City College, though his term there was interrupted by World War II. Lowe received special permission to enlist in the Marine Corps to fight in the war, joining his brother, John Vincent Lowe as a U.S. Marine. Thomas served as a phone operator in Pearl Harbor before being discharged following the end of fighting in the Pacific Theater. He returned to City College as a star football player, and despite being offered several athletic scholarships, he chose to attend Washington College in Chestertown, Maryland, where he majored in Political Science.

He married fellow student Jane D. Bradley on January 30 of their senior year. The couple moved to Easton, Maryland shortly after graduating and Lowe set up a law practice in Easton, while wife Jane became an elementary school teacher at Mt. Pleasant Elementary. In 1958, Lowe ran for office as a delegate to the General Assembly and won.

== Political career ==
Lowe served as Chairman of the Judiciary Committee in the General Assembly, where he was known as a conservative, before winning the position of Speaker of the House. In 1973, rather than running for national office, Lowe chose instead a position on the Court of Special Appeals—the state's second highest court—offered to him by then governor Marvin Mandel.

Lowe remained on the court until his death on June 13, 1984, of an aortic rupture during a heart attack.
