= William Hinson Cole =

American politician (1837–1886)

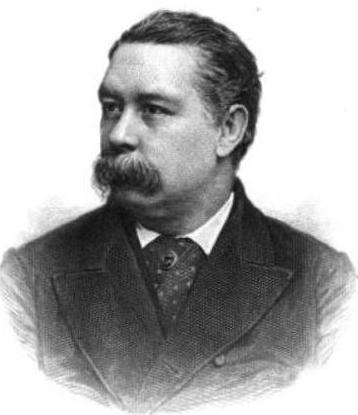
William Hinson Cole

William Hinson Cole (January 11, 1837 – July 8, 1886) was an American politician and congressman from Maryland.

== Biography ==
Born in Baltimore, Maryland, Cole attended private school and studied medicine and law. He was admitted to the bar and commenced practice in Baltimore in 1857. He later moved to Kansas City, Kansas, to practice law, and also served as a member of the Kansas Territorial House of Representatives. He graduated from the University of Louisiana (present day Tulane University) in 1860.

During the American Civil War, Cole enlisted in the Confederate States Army as a surgeon of Francis S. Bartow's Eighth Georgia Regiment. He served in the Battle of Gettysburg, then took charge of the wounded in General James Longstreet's corps. He was captured and held as prisoner at Fort McHenry in Baltimore for six months, until he was returned South and acted as surgeon on the staff of Gen. Bradley Johnson of Maryland until the close of the war.

After the war, Cole was appointed deputy register of Baltimore in 1870, but resigned when he was elected chief clerk of the first branch of the Baltimore City council. He served as a reading clerk of the Maryland House of Delegates from 1874 to 1878, and later became a reporter on the Baltimore Evening Commercial, and later its proprietor. He connected with the Baltimore Gazette, and afterward with its successor, The Baltimore Day, continuing with the press until 1885. It was at this point he was elected as a Democrat to the Forty-ninth Congress, and served from March 4, 1885 until his death in Washington, D.C. He is interred in Bonnie Brae Cemetery of Baltimore.

== See also ==
- List of members of the United States Congress who died in office (1790–1899)

U.S. House of Representatives
Preceded by Fetter Schrier Hoblitzell	Member of the U.S. House of Representatives from Maryland's 3rd congressional district March 4, 1885 – July 8, 1886	Succeeded by Harry Welles Rusk
