= James W. McCulloh =

American politician

32nd Speaker of the Maryland House of Delegates
- In office December 1826 – 1827
- Preceded by: John G. Chapman
- Succeeded by: John G. Chapman

Personal details
- Born: James William McCulloh; February 5, 1789 Philadelphia, Pennsylvania, U.S.
- Died: June 17, 1861 (aged 72) New Jersey, U.S.
- Children: Richard Sears McCulloh
- Occupation: Cashier
- Known for: McCulloch v. Maryland

James William McCulloh (February 5, 1789 – June 17, 1861) was an American politician and cashier from Baltimore. He is known for being a party in the landmark U.S. Supreme Court case McCulloch v. Maryland (1819), which held that Congress has implied powers under the Necessary and Proper Clause, and its valid exercise of those powers are supreme over the states. The case refers to him as "McCulloch" because the court clerk misspelled his name.

== Early life ==
McCulloh and partner Soloman Birkhead were in business in Baltimore as early as 1799 operating McCulloh & Birkhead. McCulloh later worked for the George Williams Counting House, part of the Second Bank of the United States, as a cashier who was twice indicted for conspiracy.

James W. McCulloh bought land that was part of the 5000-acre "Taylor's Forest" surveyed in 1678. He built a stone farmhouse on his 511-acre site between 1818 and 1825 for himself. After defending several charges of conspiracy, the property was sold to John Lewis Buchanan in 1825 and again in 1825 to his partner's son Dr. Lennox Birkhead. The estate named Hilton is now in use by Community College of Baltimore County.

McCulloh served as Comptroller of the US Treasury from 1842 to 1849.

Political offices
Preceded by John Grant Chapman	Speaker of the Maryland House of Delegates; 1827	Succeeded by John Grant Chapman
