= List of speakers of the Maryland House of Delegates =

Speaker of the Maryland House of Delegates
- Seal of Maryland

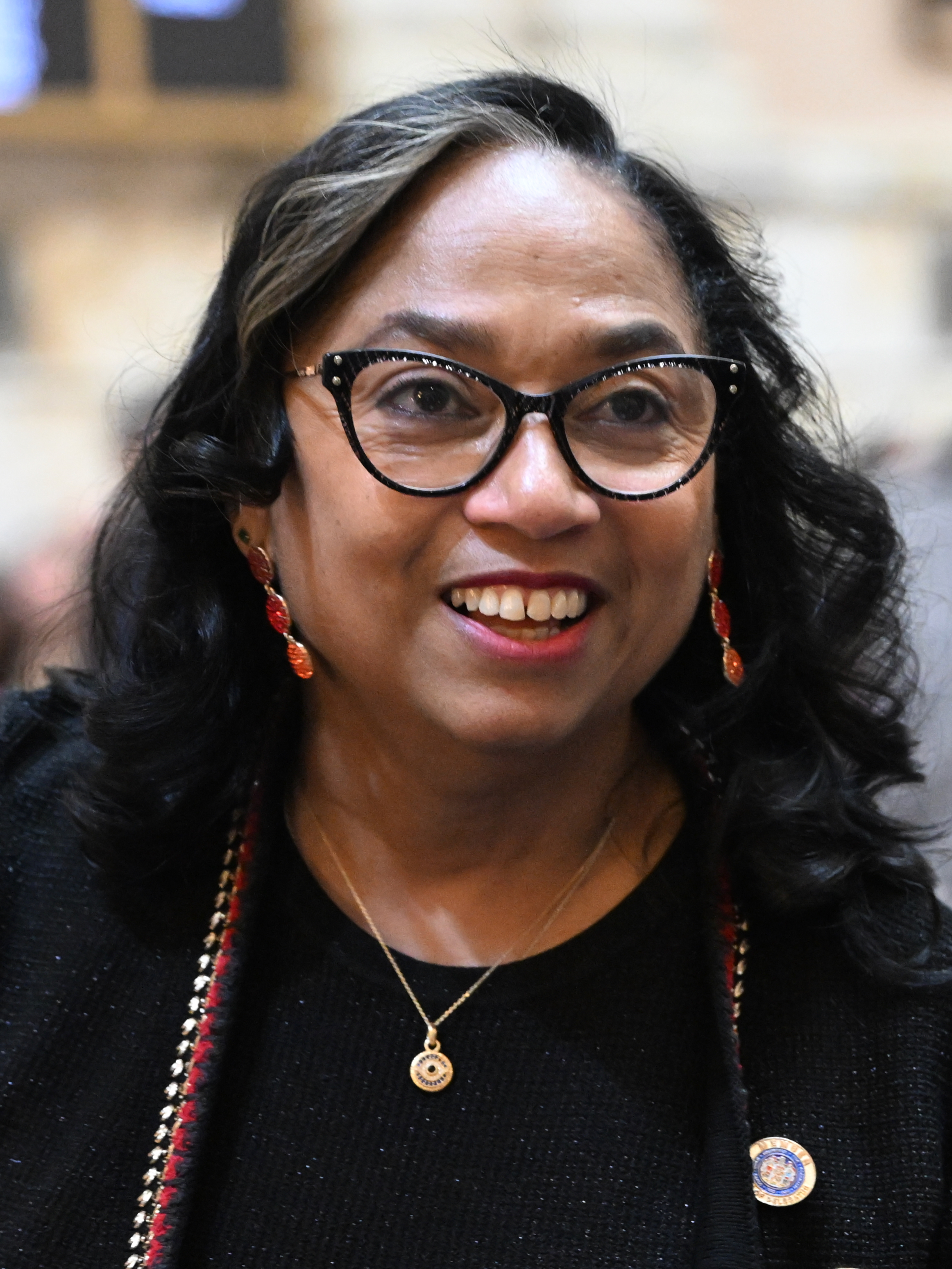
- Incumbent; Joseline Peña-Melnyk since December 16, 2025
- Style: The Honorable (diplomatic); Madam Speaker (within the assembly)
- Inaugural holder: Thomas Wootton; 1777
- Formation: Maryland State Constitution
- Website: Maryland General Assembly

The speaker of the Maryland House of Delegates presides as speaker over the House of Delegates in the state of Maryland in the United States.

== List of speakers ==
Order	Name	District	Session(s)
1	Thomas Wootton	Montgomery	February 1777
2	Nicholas Thomas	Talbot	March 1777 to March 1778
3	William Fitzhugh	Calvert	March 1778 to July 1779
4	Josias Beall	Prince George's	November 1779 to June 1780
5	William Bruff	Queen Anne's	October 1780 to May 1781
6	Turbutt Wright	Queen Anne's	June 11, 1781 to June 14, 1781
6	Thomas Cockey Deye	Baltimore	November 1781 to November 1788
7	George Dent	Charles	November 1789 to November 1790
8	Levin Winder (F)	Somerset	November 1791 to November 1793
9	John Parnham	Charles	November 1794
10	Matthew Tilghman	Kent	November 1794
11	Philip Key	St. Mary's	November 1795 to November 1796
12	James Carroll	Baltimore	November 1797
13	William Thomas	St. Mary's	November 1797
14	Henry Henley Chapman	Charles	November 1798 to November 1799
15	Edward Hall	Anne Arundel	November 1800
16	Charles Frazier	Queen Anne's	November 1801 to November 1802
17	Tobias E. Stansbury (D-R)	Baltimore	November 1803
18	Charles Frazier	Queen Anne's	November 1804
19	Tobias E. Stansbury (D-R)	Baltimore	November 1805 to November 1807
20	Levin Winder (F)	Somerset	November 1808 to June 1809
21	Tobias E. Stansbury (D-R)	Baltimore	November 1809 to June 1812
22	John Carlyle Herbert (F)	Prince George's	November 1812 to December 1813
23	Henry Henley Chapman	Charles	December 1814 to December 1815
24	Nicholas Stonestreet	Charles	December 1816 to December 1817
25	James Brown	Queen Anne's	December 1818
26	Tobias E. Stansbury (D-R)	Baltimore	December 1819 to December 1821
27	William Hammond Marriott	Anne Arundel	December 1822
28	Tobias E. Stansbury (D-R)	Baltimore	December 1823
29	William Hammond Marriott	Anne Arundel	December 1824
30	Benedict Joseph Semmes (D)	Prince George's	December 1825
31	John Grant Chapman (W)	Charles	December 1826
32	James W. McCulloh	Baltimore	December 1826
33	John Grant Chapman (W)	Charles	December 1827 to December 1828
34	Francis Thomas (D)	Frederick	December 1829
35	Richard Thomas	St. Mary's	December 1830 to December 1832
36	Thomas Wright III	Queen Anne's	December 1833
37	William J. Blakistone	St. Mary's	December 1834
38	Benjamin L. Gantt	Prince George's	December 1835 to December 1836
39	William Hallam Tuck	Prince George's	December 1837
40	Charles Sterrett Ridgely	Anne Arundel	December 1838
41	James Wray Williams (D)	Harford	December 1839
41	Charles Sterrett Ridgely	Anne Arundel	December 1840 to March 1841
42	Daniel S. Biser (D)	Frederick	December 1841
43	John Carroll LeGrand (D)	Baltimore City	December 1841
44	Daniel S. Biser (D)	Frederick	December 1842
45	William H. Watson	Baltimore City	December 1843
46	John Grant Chapman	Charles	December 1844
47	William S. Waters	Somerset	December 1845
48	John P. Kennedy (W)	Baltimore City	December 1846
49	William J. Blakistone	St. Mary's	December 1847
50	John Rankin Franklin (W)	Worcester	December 1849
51	Elias Ware	Baltimore City	January 1852 to January 1853
52	John F. Dent	St. Mary's	January 1854
53	William H. Travers	Baltimore City	January 1856
54	John Summerfield Berry	Baltimore	January 1858
55	Elbridge George Kilbourn	Anne Arundel	January 1860 to July 1861
56	John Summerfield Berry	Baltimore	December 1861 to January 1862
57	Thomas H. Kemp	Calvert	January 1864
58	John M. Frazier (Natl Union)	Baltimore City, District 2	January 1865 to January 1866
59	Oliver Miller (D)	Anne Arundel	January 1867
60	William A. Stewart (D)	Baltimore City, District 1	January 1868
61	Ferdinand Claiborne Latrobe (D)	Baltimore City, District 2	January 1870
62	Arthur Pue Gorman (D)	Howard	January 1872
63	Jesse K. Hines (D)	Kent	January 1874
64	Lewis C. Smith (D)	Washington	January 1876
65	Fetter S. Hoblitzell (D)	Baltimore City, District 1	January 1878
66	Hiram McCullough (D)	Cecil	January 1880
67	Otis Keilholtz (D)	Baltimore City, District 3	January 1882
68	Joseph Pembroke Thom (D)	Baltimore City, District 2	January 1884
69	Joseph B. Seth (D)	Talbot	January 1886
70	George M. Upshur (D)	Worcester	January 1888
71	John Hubner (D)	Baltimore	January 1890
72	Murray Vandiver (D)	Harford	January 1892
73	James H. Preston (D)	Baltimore City, District 2	January 1894
74	Sydney Emanuel Mudd I (R)	Charles	January 1896
75	Louis Schaefer (R)	Baltimore City, District 3	January 1898
76	Lloyd Wilkinson (D)	Worcester	January 1900
77	Ferdinand Claiborne Latrobe (D)	Baltimore City, District 2	March 1901
78	Noble L. Mitchell (D)	Harford	January 1902 to April 1902
79	George Y. Everhart (D)	Baltimore	January 1904
80	Carville D. Benson (D)	Baltimore	January 1906
81	James Enos Ray, Jr. (D)	Prince George's	January 1908
82	Adam Peeples (D)	Cecil	January 1910
83	James Trippe (D)	Baltimore City, District 3	January 1912 to January 1914
84	Philip D. Laird (D)	Montgomery	January 1916
85	David G. McIntosh Jr. (D)	Baltimore	June 1917
86	Herbert R. Wooden (R)	Carroll	January 1918
87	Millard Tydings (D)	Harford	January 1920 to September 1920
88	John L. G. Lee (D)	Harford	January 1922
89	Francis P. Curtis (D)	Baltimore City, District 2	January 1924
90	E. Brooke Lee (D)	Montgomery	January 1927 to July 1930
91	Francis A. Michel (D)	Baltimore City, District 2	January 1931
92	T. Barton Harrington (D)	Baltimore City, District 3	January 1933 to November 1933
93	Emanuel Gorfine (D)	Baltimore City, District 4	January 1935 to April 1937
94	Thomas E. Conlon (D)	Baltimore City, District 5	January 1939 to January 1943
95	John S. White (D)	Prince George's	March 1944 to December 1946
96	C. Ferdinand Sybert (D)	Howard	January 1947 to November 1950
97	John C. Luber (D)	Baltimore City, District 5	January 1951 to June 1958
98	Perry O. Wilkinson (D)	Prince George's	January 1959 to May 1962
99	A. Gordon Boone (D)	Baltimore	January 1963
100	Marvin Mandel (D)	Baltimore City, District 5	February 1964 to January 1969
101	Thomas Hunter Lowe (D)	Talbot	January 1969 to July 1973
102	John Hanson Briscoe (D)	St. Mary's, later District 29	November 1973 to January 1978
103	Benjamin L. Cardin (D)	Baltimore City, District 42	January 1979 to January 1987
104	R. Clayton Mitchell, Jr. (D)	Kent, District 36	January 1987 to January 1993
105	Casper R. Taylor, Jr. (D)	Allegany, District 1c	January 8, 1994 to January 8, 2003
106	Michael E. Busch (D)	Anne Arundel, District 30	January 8, 2003 to April 7, 2019
107	Adrienne A. Jones (D)	Baltimore, District 10	April 7, 2019 to May 1, 2019 (acting) May 1, 2019 to December 4, 2025
108	Dana Stein (D)	Baltimore, District 11B	December 4, 2025 to December 16, 2025 (acting)
109	Joseline Peña-Melnyk (D)	Anne Arundel and Prince George's, District 21	December 16, 2025–present

== See also ==
- List of Maryland General Assemblies
