= Richard Sears McCulloh =

Richard Sears McCulloh (18 March 1818 – 1894) was an American civil engineer and professor of mechanics and thermodynamics at the Washington and Lee University, Lexington, Virginia.

== Career ==
McCulloh was born on 18 March 1818 in Baltimore, Maryland, United States. He graduated from the College of New Jersey in 1836, then studied chemistry in Philadelphia with James Curtis Booth from 1838 to 1839. From 1846 to 1849 he worked for the U.S. Mint in Philadelphia. He was elected to the American Philosophical Society in 1846. McCulloh was appointed professor of natural philosophy at Princeton University on 24 October 1849, and then professor of natural and experimental philosophy at Columbia College on 3 April 1854.

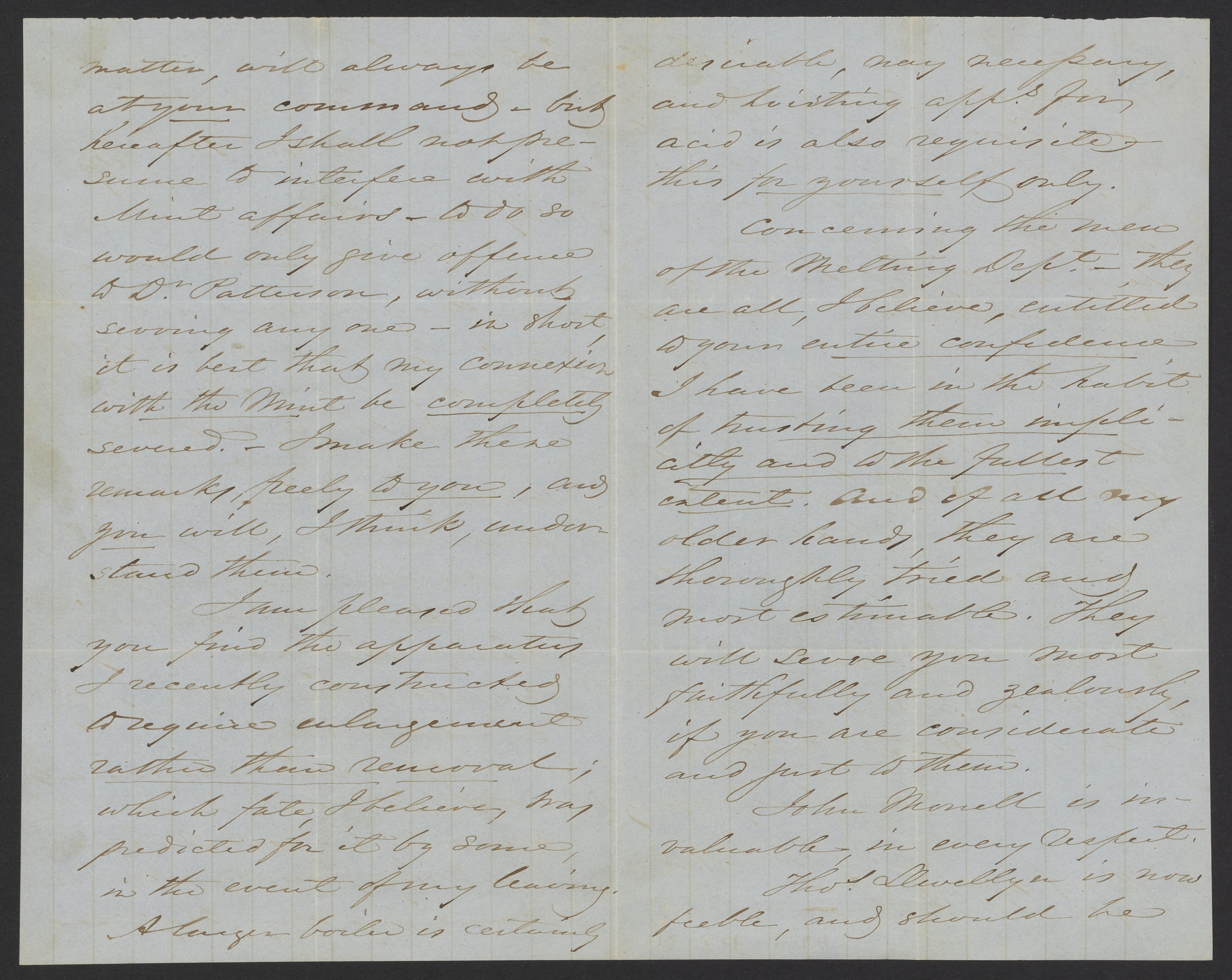
December 12, 1849 letter from McCulloh to James C. Booth

During the American Civil War, McCulloh disappeared from New York after the draft riots and in October 1863 McCulloh went to Richmond, Virginia to become the consulting chemist of the Confederate Nitre and Mining Bureau. In response, Columbia College expelled him from his professorship. While in Richmond, he helped "the Confederacy in making a chemical weapon". His experiments in creating a lethal gas were proved successful in February 1865, but before the weapon could be used in practice Richmond fell in April 1865. McCulloh fled the city but was captured two months later off the coast of Florida, and for almost two years was imprisoned in the Virginia State Penitentiary.

After being released, in 1866 McCulloh was appointed to the new "McCormick Professorship of Experimental Philosophy & Applied Mathematics" at Washington and Lee College. He resigned later during financial retrenchment. In 1869 he was a member of a faculty committee that created an expensive plan for expanding the Washington College curriculum dramatically. In January 1870 he was a Professor of Natural Philosophy at Washington College. In 1878, McCulloh received an honorary doctorate of law degree from Washington and Lee University.

== Work ==
McCulloh was interested in a range of practical and scientific subjects. He prepared a plan for organizing the naval observatory. He wrote on the use of hydrometers to measure sugar and alcohol content of liquids, and wrote a treatise on electricity. He invented a method of refining California gold that involved combining the ore with zinc. This invention was similar to an independent invention by his former teacher James Curtis Booth, and the two men agreed to combine their inventions into a single patent, which they sold to an interested industrialist.

In 1876, a collection of McCulloh's lecture notes were published in a book entitled Treatise on the Mechanical Theory of Heat and its Application to the Steam Engine, Etc. McCulloh acknowledged the pioneering work of James Prescott Joule and Nicolas Léonard Sadi Carnot in establishing the laws of thermodynamics. He went on to say of this discipline that "there are few, if any, branches of natural science which are not more or less dependent upon the great truths under consideration". He gave as an example the view that the body of an animal was essentially a heat engine, fueled by the food consumed.

== Bibliography ==
- Richard Sears McCulloh (1844). Plan of organization for the Naval Observatory: submitted by request to the Secretary of the Navy, November 17th, 1843. J. & G.S. Gideon.
- Richard Sears McCulloh, United States. National Bureau of Standards, United States. Congress Senate (1848). Reports from the Secretary of the Treasury: of scientific investigations in relation to sugar and hydrometers, made under the superintendence of Professor R. S. McCulloh. Wendell and Van Benthuysen, Printers.
- Richard Sears McCulloh (1849). A manual containing tables to be used by the revenue officers of the United States: with glass hydrometers, indicating the per cents by volume of alcohol in spirituous liquors, for determining their relative values, & c. L. Johnson & Co.
- Richard Sears McCulloh (1851). Memorial of the Congress of the United States: requesting an investigation and legislation in relation to the new method for refining gold. John T. Robinson, printer.
- Richard Sears McCulloh (1852). Report made to the Hon. Thomas Corwin, Secretary of the Treasury: by Professor R. S. McCulloh, of his operations at the mint of the United States, in refining California gold by his zinc method. Gideon & Co., Printers.
- Richard Sears McCulloh (1853). The proceedings of the late director of the mint, in relation to the official misconduct of Franklin Peale, Esq., chief coiner, and other abuses in the mint. YA Pamphlet Collection (Library of Congress).
- Richard Sears McCulloh. On the present state of knowledge of the chemistry and physiology of the sugar cane, and of saccharine substances.
- Richard Sears McCulloh (1872). Lectures on the mechanical theory of heat, and the steam engine ..., Part 1.
- R.S. McCulloh (1876). Treatise on the mechanical theory of heat and its applications to the steam-engine, etc. New York: D. Van Nostrand.
