= Harold C. Smith =

American politician (born 1894)

- Born: Harold Calmes Smith; January 14, 1894; Rockville, Maryland
- Died: February 9, 1972 (aged 78); Bethesda, Maryland
- Education: Rockville Academy; University of Texas
- Political party: Republican
- Spouses: Anne Smith (m. 1917) Ruth McGuffey (m. 1965)
- Children: 3
- Parents: Edwin Smith; Lucy Scott Smith

Harold Calmes Smith, Sr. (January 14, 1894 - February 9, 1972) was an American politician, and attorney. He was integral to the establishment to the Rockville, Maryland Chamber of Commerce, and was a co-founder of the Montgomery County Bus Company which became part of DC Transit, and of Olney Theatre Center.

== Early life and education ==
Harold Calmes Smith was born on January 14, 1894. He was the fifth son of six children born to astronomer Edwin Smith and Lucy Scott Smith (née Black). He five siblings survive to adulthood; Edwin III (1886), Lucy (1888), Theron (1890), and twins Duncan and Ralph (1892).

As a young child, in 1907, when he was 13-years old, he volunteered as the timekeeper for school sporting events at Rockville Academy. When he attended Rockville Academy, he continued his involvement in the athletic program. At 16-years old, he served as the baseball team manager, in addition to playing shortstop. The following year, in 1911, Smith organized a track and field team, and served as team manager.

When Smith was 19-years old, his father passed away after a prolonged illness.

After the end of the first World War, Harold attended George Washington University.

== Career ==
=== World War I ===
In August 1918, Harold was drafted to the United States Army to fight in World War I.

Smith served in the United States Army during World War I.

=== Politics ===
On August 2, 1925, forty men, including Smith, met at the Rockville Court House to start the formation of a Rockville Chamber of Commerce. Smith was chosen as chairman of the proposal committee, and a follow up meeting was held on August 21, at Montgomery County Club. At the meeting, it was decided who the officers of the Rockville Chamber of Commerce would be: president, W. Valentine Wilson; vice-president, George H. Lamar; secretary, Harold C. Smith; treasurer, William F. Prettyman. In 1926, Smith served as secretary for the Rockville Chamber of Commerce, he continued to do so until 1931.

In 1928, he co-founded the Montgomery County Bus Company, which became part of DC Transit.

Later, in August 1928, he was elected State Commander for the American Legion.

In 1932, and 1934, Harold ran for Maryland's 6th congressional district, though his congressional bids were unsuccessful.

In February 1935, Smith was indorsed by the Republican State Central Committee for the post of judge of the police court to succeed Judge Donald A. DeLashmutt He was later appointed the Police Justice of Montgomery County by Governor of Maryland Harry Nice. Later that year in November, Harold announced he candidacy for the United States House of Representatives for 1936, to unseat David John Lewis.

In 1936, Thomas L. Dawson, the Secretary of State of Maryland, drove drunk resulting in a triple car accident that left the other drivers permanently disfigured. Dawson was served the warrant for his arrest while he was in bed, with Smith overseeing the case. Smith fined him for reckless driving, but dismissed the charges of driving under the influence.

In 1942, Smith was appointed president of the organization Montgomery County Dairy Herd Improvement Association.

=== Later career ===
Starting in 1953, Smith began practicing law with his son, Harold C. Smith Jr.

== Personal life ==
Harold married Anne Flora Smith on October 5, 1917, in Denison, Texas. They welcomed their first child Anne Louise Smith in 1919.

In April 1949, a farm granary and machine shed belonging to Smith were destroyed in a fire.

In June, his mother Lucy Scott Smith passed away.

Smith suffered a series of strokes later in life, and passed away as a result on February 9, 1972. He died at his home at 10213 Farnham Drive, Bethesda, Maryland.

== See also ==
- William V. Bouic
