= F. Scott Fitzgerald Theatre =

- Interactive map of F. Scott Fitzgerald Theatre
- Former names: Civic Center Auditorium
- Address: 603 Edmonston Dr. Rockville, Maryland; United States
- Coordinates: 39.0848°N 77.1290°W
- Capacity: 406

Construction
- Opened: September 1960; 65 years ago

Website
- www.rockvillemd.gov/places/f-scott-fitzgerald-theatre/

F. Scott Fitzgerald Theatre is a theatre in Rockville, Maryland. It opened in September 1960, and has a seating capacity of 406. It is owned and operated by the City of Rockville. It is the second community venue after the Rockville Opera House.

== History ==
The Rockville City Council accepted a proposal for the Civic Center Auditorium by the firm Satterlee and Smith, but terminated the contract in March 1959. In November 1959, the city awarded the new contract to Stanley H. Arthur. He had the contract to design and supervise construction of the auditorium's gross structure, the interior lobby, control booth for electrical devices, the front canopy for the building, the stage and house lights, and the air-conditioning. The City Council planned for the auditorium to be completed by Fall 1960.

Construction on the theatre began in 1960, for what was at that time called the Rockville Civic Center Auditorium.

Edward Mack, chairman of the dedication subcommittee of the Civic Center Commission, reported to the Rockville City Council that the dedication ceremony would be on August 28. The auditorium was dedicated by Mayor Alexander J. Green, with additional speakers, and a concert by the Rockville Band.

The first production staged at the theatre was Howie, by Rockville Little Theatre in November 1960.

The Maryland State Opera Company debuted their first production at the theatre in 1988.

In August 2024, it was announced the theatre would close for nine months for renovations focused on improving accessibility and sound, including upgrades to comply with Americans with Disabilities Act. It reopened in August 2025, after closing in December of the previous year.
