= Rockville Opera House =

Former theatre in Rockville, Maryland, United States

- Interactive map of Rockville Opera House
- Address: Rockville, Maryland; United States
- Coordinates: 39.0839°N 77.1506°W
- Operator: Spencer Cone Jones (president)

The Rockville Opera House was a small-town opera house in Rockville, Maryland. The theatre was used to host various events, including democratic congressional campaigns, lectures, concerts, and balls.

== History ==
The Rockville Assembly held an extravagant ball at the Opera House in December 1893. The hall was decorated with a profusion of bunting, evergreens, and flowers. An orchestra from Washington, D.C. performed, and guests attended from all over the state.

In June 1894, the commencement ceremony for Rockville Academy was held at the Rockville Opera House. The large hall was decorated with Evergreens and the stage was loaded with potted plants and flowers.

In October 1894, Vaudeville performances were held at the theatre, and were produced by the Washington Armature Dramatic Company.

Janet H. Young and Alice Kraft from the New England Conservatory of Music in Boston performed at the Rockville Opera House in 1896.

The commencement ceremony for Rockville High School was held at the Opera House in June 1899. That September, a protest was held at the Opera House against the removal of Rockville High School teacher Miss Lucy Garrett. 300 people attended the protest, and Rockville Mayor Spencer Jones presided over the meeting.

In February 1900, the stockholders of the Rockville Opera House elected a new board of directors. The shareholders appointed Spencer Cone Jones as President.

A minstrel show, Mixed Minstrels, which featured the "latest ragtime, old Southern melodies, and a special dancing number" was produced at the Opera House in May 1914.

The three-act comedy Stop Thief, by permission of the George M. Cohan Publishing Company, was presented at the Opera House in 1915. The production starred John M. Kline from the Poli Stock Company.

In May 1922, the musical Howdy, Honey was presented at the Opera House under the direction of Mrs. Berry E. Clark. Ticket sales went to the benefit of the Rockville Baseball team. The show was described as the, "...the most elaborate production this company of players has yet attempted."

The Rockville Assembly held another Christmas Dance at the Rockville Opera House in December 1924. The Washington Orchestra performed, and refreshments were served at midnight.

== Known productions ==
Notable productions at the theater
Opening year	Name	Refs.
1914	Mixed Minstrels!	
1915	Stop Thief!	
1922	Howdy, Honey	
