= Glenview Mansion (Rockville) =

Historic house in Maryland, United States

- U.S. National Register of Historic Places
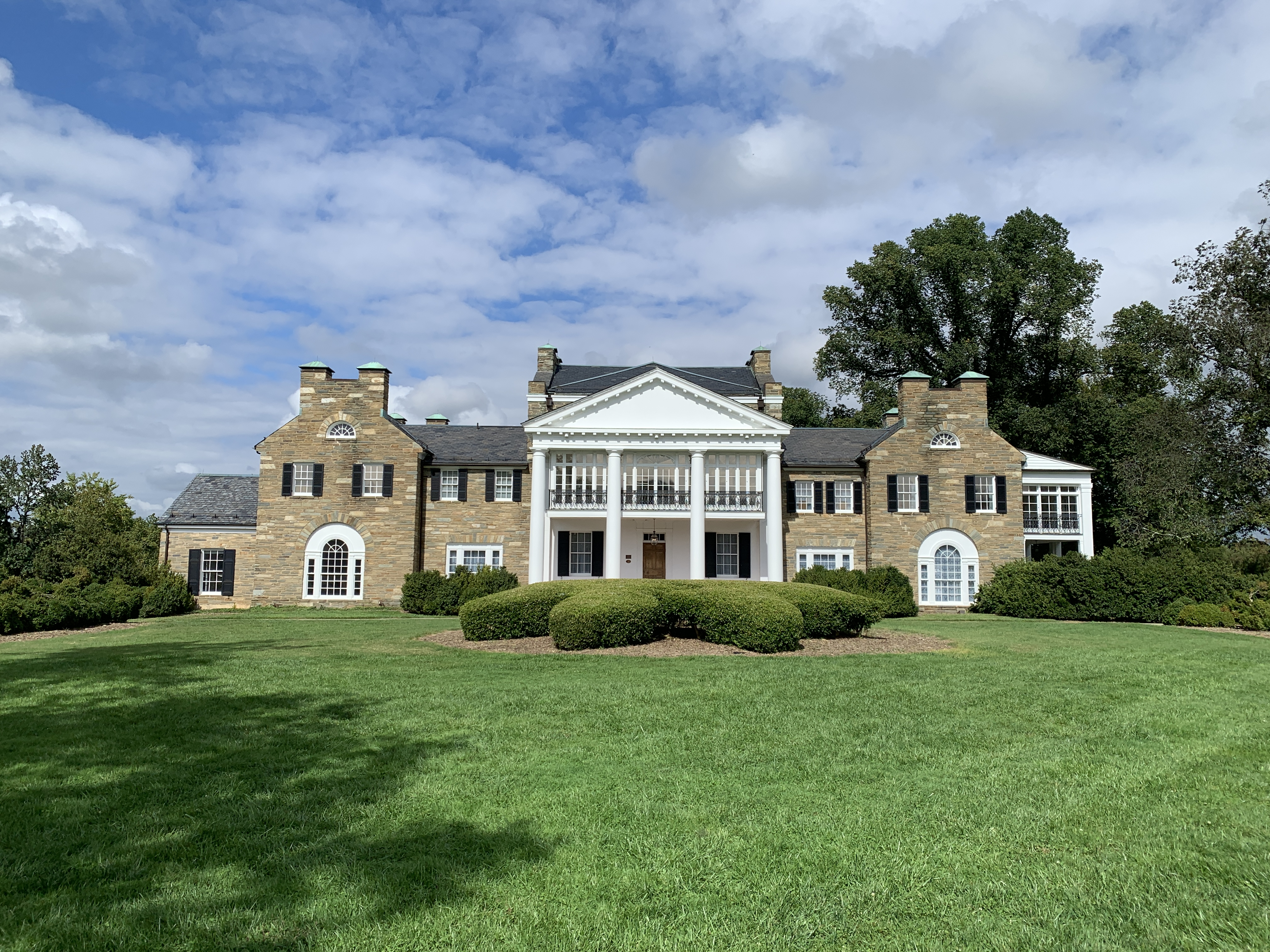
- Glenview Mansion, September 2020

- Location within Maryland Location within the United States
- Location: 603 Edmonston Dr., Rockville, Maryland
- Coordinates: 39°05′11″N 77°07′45″W
- Area: 65 acres (26 ha)
- Built: 1926
- Architect: Porter, Irwin S.; Lockie, Joseph A.; James H. Small III (Landscape Architect)
- Architectural style: Classical Revival
- NRHP reference No.: 07001073
- Added to NRHP: October 10, 2007

Glenview Mansion is a historic home and surrounding property located at Rockville, Montgomery County, Maryland. The house is a 1926 Neo-Classical Revival style house on 65 acres (260,000 m^{2}) of landscaped ground. The five-part mansion incorporates the remnants of the 1838 house called "Glenview." Since 1957, the house and grounds have been owned by the City of Rockville, and are used for various civic, cultural and social events, and is known as Rockville Civic Center Park. The house also includes the Glenview Mansion Art Gallery.

== History ==
Catharine and Richard Johns Bowie, the original owners of the property, purchased 500 acres of land that the mansion now stands on and had their slaves clear its forests to grow corn, wheat, rye, potatoes, and hay as well as raise cattle, horses, sheep, and pigs. In 1838, their slaves built a two-story house on the highest point of their property and named it Glenview. The Glenview house and farm were built by around two dozen enslaved Black people. The enslaved Black people who worked at Glenview were freed between 1862 and 1864, due to the abolition of slavery.

Richard Bowie was an attorney practicing in the courts of Montgomery and Prince George's counties since 1826; was admitted as an attorney to the Maryland Court of Appeals in 1827; elected to the Senate of Maryland in 1836; and served on the board of Rockville Academy and the Rockville Female Seminary. In 1839, he was appointed as the Delegate representing the Fifth Congressional District of Maryland to the National Whig Convention, which supported Henry Clay for the presidency, and in 1849, he was elected as a Representative (Whig) in the U.S. Congress. Despite being pro-Union, Bowie was a slave owner and an anti-abolitionist.

Glenview remained in the Bowie family until 1904, then changed hands several times until Irene Moore Smith purchased a portion of the Bowie farm with its house in 1917. Five years later, she married former Army surgeon James Alexander Lyon of Washington, DC. In 1923, the Lyons hired the newly formed architectural firm of Porter and Lockie to transform Glenview from a farm to a fashionable country estate designed for entertaining. The original house the Bowies built still survives in the center of the much larger Neoclassical mansion.

After Irene Lyon's death in 1950, her husband James Alexander Lyon began selling off parcels of the estate for housing developments, including one hundred acres to develop housing in what would become the Burgundy Estates and Burgundy Knolls neighborhoods. In 1954, the Montgomery County Historical Society purchased the house and twenty-eight acres. The organization struggled to maintain the property, resorting to the sale of plants from the garden and leasing classroom for overcrowded Twinbrook Elementary School. By fall 1956, the board of the historical society decided to sell the property.

In response to growing interest in a community center, the City of Rockville explored the potential reuse of Glenview versus the cost of constructing a new structure. Despite concerns over the functional limitations of the house and constraints of the formal gardens on future expansion, the Mayor and Council unanimously approved the purchase for $125,000 in late 1956 (~$1.06 million in 2024) as its future civic center.

Glenview Mansion quickly became a popular location for recreational programs as well as cultural and social organizations, including the Rockville Art League, Civil Defense, and Young in Heart (a senior citizen group). In 1960, the City of Rockville added the Civic Auditorium (now called the F. Scott Fitzgerald Theatre) and by 1963, it included tennis courts, a public works building, and an animal shelter.

It was listed on the National Register of Historic Places in 2007.
