= Edwin Smith (astronomer) =

American astronomer

- Born: April 13, 1851; New York City
- Died: December 1, 1912 (aged 61); Rockville, Maryland
- Education: City College of New York
- Occupation: Astronomer
- Employer: United States Coast and Geodetic Survey
- Spouse: Lucy Scott Smith
- Children: 6, including Harold C. Smith

Edwin Smith (April 13, 1851 - December 1, 1912) was an American astronomer, and a founding member of the Cosmos Club and National Geographic Society.

== Early life ==
Edwin Smith was born in New York City on Sunday, April 13, 1851, and was raised during the Gilded Age. He was the fourth son of six children born to Edwin, a city surveyor, and Adelia Olivia Smith (née McIntyre). His paternal grandfather George B. Smith, brother of Theophilus W. Smith, was the long time agent for John Jacob Astor. George B., his grandfather, and his father Edwin were witnesses for the publication of John Jacob Astor's will on December 30, 1836.

He attended the College of the City of New York.

== Career ==
=== Transit of Venus ===
On April 8, 1874, it was announced that Edwin was chosen as "chief of party" to lead an expedition to Chatham Island, New Zealand, to study the Transit of Venus.

On January 10, 1875, Edwin and his party returned to Otago aboard the steam ship USS Swatara Letters by Edwin, dated January 15, were received in Washington, D.C., and were reprinted in newspapers.

In April 1882, Edwin, attended a meeting of the National Academy of Sciences.

In July 1882, he was in New Zealand.

=== Alaskan expedition ===
On March 31, 1905, Edwin left Washington, D.C., bound for Seattle, Washington, on route to Alaska. He arrived in Skagway, Alaska on June 24, after passing through Juneau.

Edwin returned home in April 1906.

On July 30, 1906, Edwin arrived in Spokane on his way to Alaska. The goal of the trip was to identify the exact boundary between the United States and Canada.

== Personal life ==
Edwin and his wife Lucy had six children, Edwin (born in 1886), Lucy (born in 1888). They moved to Rockville, Maryland in 1890, and had Theron (born in 1890), twins Duncan and Ralph (born in 1892), and Harold (born in 1894).

In 1896, Edwin left to visit New York for a month.

In August 1906, Edwin attended a "baby party," where everyone present wore "genuine baby pattern garments."

Edwin was acquainted with James Veirs, and attended a dinner he hosted at Montgomery Country Club. Edwin would also play euchre at the country club.

He was a co-founder of the Cosmos Club and served on its "House committee".

Edwin died December 1, 1912.

== Bibliography ==
- Smith, Edwin (May 1, 1884). Determinations of Gravity With The Kater Pendulums at Auckland, New Zealand; Sydney, New South Wales; Singapore, British India; Tokio, Japan; San Francisco, Cal. And Washington, D.C. (Report). Washington, D.C.: US Government Printing Office. pp. 439–473.
- Smith, Edwin (October 7, 1904). Determination of Longitude (Report). Vol. 20. Science. pp. 466–471.
- Smith, Edwin (May 22, 1909). "William Eimbeck, 1841-1909". Science. 30 (758). Washington, D.C.: American Association for the Advancement of Science: 48–50. (Note: Memorial address before the Philosophical Society of Washington, May 22, 1909.)

== Legacy ==
The 1964 film Lilith, starring Warren Beatty utilized the home Edwin built in Rockville, Maryland. His daughter Lucy, portrayed the grandmother of Beatty's character Vincent.

== See also ==
- Edward S. Holden
