= Rockville Little Theatre =

Coordinates: 39.0848°N 77.1289°W

Rockville Little Theatre is a community theatre organization in Rockville, Maryland. Founded in the late 1940s, it was described by The Washington Post in 1982 as among the oldest continuously operating amateur theatre groups in the Washington area.

== History ==
Rockville Little Theatre was formed in 1947 and presented its first production on November 26, 1948. According to the theatre's own history, its early productions were staged at Christ Episcopal Parish Hall and Broome Junior High School. In 1960, the company moved into the Rockville Civic Center Auditorium, later known as the F. Scott Fitzgerald Theatre, where it has continued to perform.

In 1982, The Washington Post reported that Rockville Little Theatre was in its 35th season.

== Productions and activities ==
The City of Rockville stated in 2017 that the company's first 70 years included 291 productions involving thousands of actors and behind-the-scenes volunteers. In 2024, Rockville Little Theatre's production of Funeral for the Cat won first place for Outstanding Production at the Maryland Community Theatre Festival.
