= Soul In Motion Players =

Non-profit performing arts organization

Soul In Motion Players is a non-profit performing arts organization, founded in 1984 by Percussionist Michael Friend, specializes in African Dance, African Drumming, Theatre, and Spoken Word. The ensemble is based in Rockville, MD.

The group performs in and around the Washington DC area at various festivals including the Washington Folk Festival, The Takoma Park Folk Festival, Dance Africa, Juneteenth Celebration in St. Mary's County, and Rockville's MLK Celebration.

In 2011, Soul In Motion received the prestigious Montgomery County Executive Community Award for Excellence in the Arts. Earlier that same year, the ensemble received a $4,000 grant from the Arts & Humanities Council of Montgomery County to provide free dance and drum classes in the historically Black community of Lincoln Park in Rockville, MD.

The group includes dancers: Pam Lassiter Rhone, Nikki Childress, Patina Strother, Monique Walker, Jennifer Jones, Re'Vonte Bradley, Charla Lewis, Amber Golden. The drum battery includes Michael Friend, Papa Aziz Ahmed, Abdou Muhammad, and Michelle Hutton.
