= William V. Bouic =

American lawyer and politician

President of The Farmers Banking and Trust Company
- In office 1900–1906

Member of the Maryland State Senate
- In office 1898–1901
- Governor: Lloyd Lowndes Jr. (1898–1900); John Walter Smith (1900–1901)

Mayor of Rockville, Maryland
- In office October 28, 1890 – June 23, 1891
- Preceded by: Daniel F. Owens
- Succeeded by: Hattersley W. Talbott
- In office 1888–1890
- Preceded by: Hattersley W. Talbott (as Commissioner of Rockville)
- Succeeded by: Daniel F. Owens

Commissioner of Rockville, Maryland
- In office 1872–1881
- Preceded by: Matthew Fields
- Succeeded by: N. D. Offutt
- In office 1867–1868
- Preceded by: Melchisdec Green
- Succeeded by: John R. Miller
- In office 1864–1866
- Preceded by: Office established
- Succeeded by: Melchisdec Green

Personal details
- Born: July 20, 1846 Montgomery County, Maryland, U.S.
- Died: October 12, 1906 (aged 60) Rockville, Maryland, U.S.
- Party: Democratic
- Education: Columbian College
- Profession: Lawyer

William Veirs Bouic (July 20, 1846 – October 12, 1906) was an American lawyer and politician, a member of the Maryland State Senate. He was a Democrat and the first mayor of Rockville, Maryland.

== Early life and education ==
Bouic was born near Rockville, Maryland, the only son of William Veirs Bouic, a long-time judge of the Maryland Sixth Judicial Circuit. Bouic studied law with his father, attended Rockville Academy and graduated from Columbian College (now, George Washington University) in 1868 with an A.B. degree and received his A.M. in 1871.

== Career ==
=== Legal practice ===
Bouic was admitted to the Maryland bar in 1870, generally representing the B & O Railroad locally until 1906, and was in a legal partnership with lawyer Thomas Anderson from 1870 to 1900. Bouic was a charter member and served as vice-president of the Maryland State Bar Association in 1896, and he also held the position of secretary for the Montgomery County Bar Association. He was also on the Rockville town council for 17 years.

=== Federal politics ===
Politically, Bouic was a Democrat. He was a presidential elector in the 1892 U.S. presidential election, during which he supported Democrat Grover Cleveland.

=== Local politics ===
Bouic was the commissioner and then mayor of Rockville for 17 years, the inaugural holder of both offices. He was also on the town council for 17 years.

=== State politics ===
In 1897, Bouic was elected to the Maryland Senate, which he served in as a Democrat until 1901. He served as president of The Farmers Banking and Trust Company from 1900 until his death at Rockville in 1906.

=== Private practice ===
Bouic was a member of the Board of Trustees for the Rockville Academy and held positions as secretary and treasurer of the Montgomery Agricultural Society. Bouic was also involved with fraternal organizations, notably as a member of the Knights of Pythias.
