= Rockville Academy =

Location
- 103 South Adams Street; Rockville, Montgomery County, Maryland 20850; United States; 39°04′57″N 77°09′18″W

Information
- Type: Private; college-preparatory; day; boarding
- Established: October 12, 1812 (213 years ago)
- Grades: 9–12
- Gender: Boys
- Campus type: Large suburban

Rockville Academy was an state funded academy in Rockville, Maryland, founded in the 1800s. It operated for over a hundred years, until after World War I.

== History ==
Rockville Academy was proposed by act of the Maryland Senate on December 30, 1809, and on January 10, 1810, the Maryland General Assembly passed an ACT incorporating the academy. It wasn't until that December, that they began advertising for teachers, searching for people qualified to teach Latin and Greek languages, in addition to mathematics. "The professor in the classical department for the Latin and Greek languages is to be considered as the Rector or principal of the institution," said Secretary J. Elgar, "whose duty it shall be to superintend the general management of the several schools, with authority to insist upon a due observance and execution of the rules, to aid and assist the other teachers by his counsel and advice, and to enforce good order and proper discipline throughout the institution."

To finance the school, Maryland permitted the sale of lottery tickets to raise funds.

Rockville Academy opened for a reception of students in Latin, Greek, and Mathematics, on October 12, 1812, under the care of reverend Samuel Martin. The cost of tuition was £10 (Note: The Coinage Act of 1792 created United States currency, but pre-revolutionary terminology like Pound sterling were still used, and were accepted as legal tender until 1857.) annually, and to be paid in installments quarterly, for room and board the cost was £30. The Academy utilized the original 1790s Montgomery County Courthouse, as the school building.

By 1917, the cost of yearly tuition was $50. When the school reopened on September 10, 1917, it opened as a military school under the direction of Major George M. Thomas, who relocated from Charlotte Hall Military Academy. At the time, the school uniform were "natty gray suits" produced by New York Clothing House in Baltimore. Enrollment continued to grow that year. That December, the students debated whether the, "government should require military training for all boys over twelve years of age." The resolution was decided in the negative. The first commencement ceremony as a military school was held on June 12, 1918.

=== Legacy ===
In 1937, the Rockville Library moved into the former Academy building. By the 1950s, it was still being used for the Library.

== Athletics ==
Rockville Academy featured a number of athletics programs including football. In 1911, a track and field team was established.

== Notable alumni ==
- Cleland K. Nelsen - Dean of convocation of Episcopal Diocese of Maryland
- Harold C. Smith - Co-founder of the Rockville Chamber of Commerce
