= Rockville, Maryland =

- City
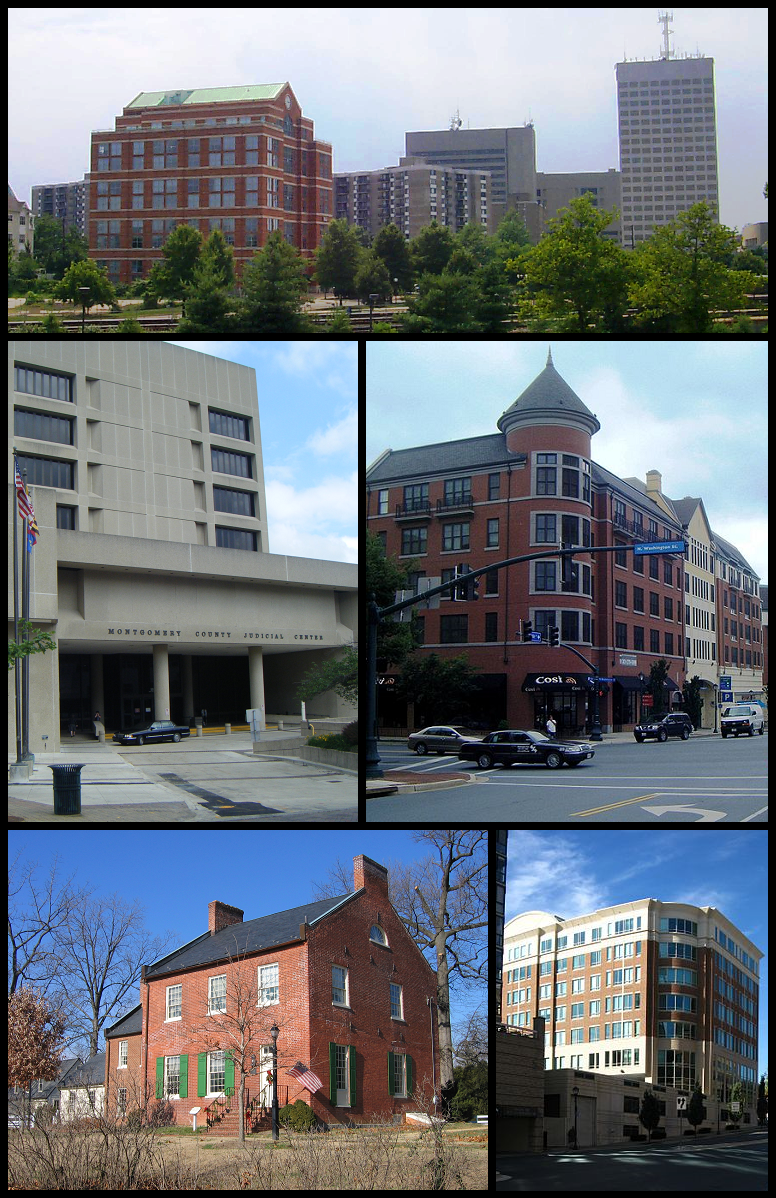
- Downtown Rockville in 2001, the Montgomery County Judicial Center in 2010, the Rockville Town Square in 2010, the Beall-Dawson House in 2005, and downtown Rockville in 2008

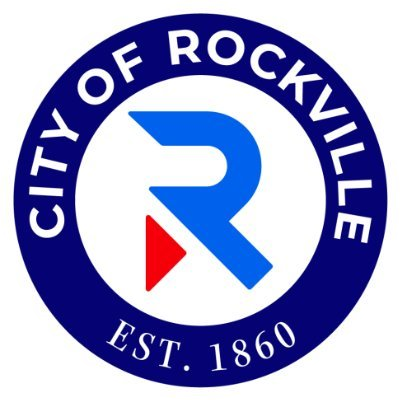
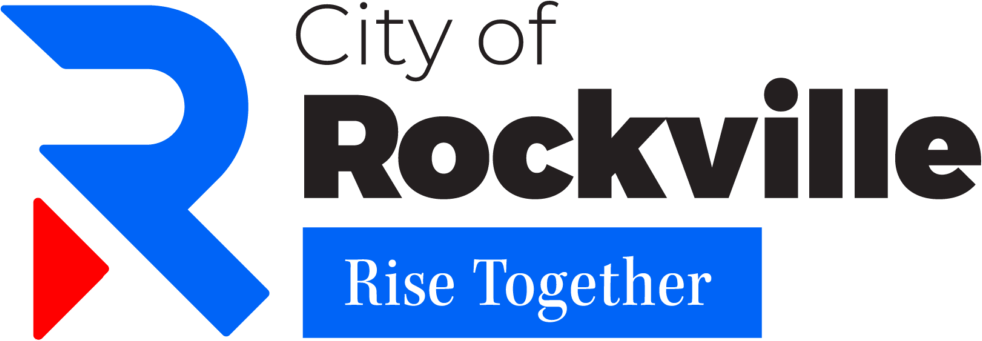
- Flag Seal Coat of arms Wordmark
- Motto: "Rise together!"
- Location in Montgomery County and Maryland

- Location in Maryland Rockville (the United States)
- Coordinates: 39°04′48″N 77°08′34″W
- Country: United States
- State: Maryland
- County: Montgomery
- Settled: 1717
- Founded: 1803
- Incorporated: 1860

Government
  - Type: Council–manager
  - Mayor: Monique Ashton (D)

Area
  - Total: 13.64 sq mi (35.33 km^{2})
  - Land: 13.60 sq mi (35.23 km^{2})
  - Water: 0.035 sq mi (0.09 km^{2})
- Elevation: 449 ft (137 m)

Population (2020)
  - Total: 67,117
  - Density: 4,933.7/sq mi (1,904.92/km^{2})
- Time zone: UTC−5 (EST)
  - Summer (DST): UTC−4 (EDT)
- ZIP Codes: 20847–20853 & 20857
- Area codes: 301, 240
- FIPS code: 24-67675
- GNIS feature ID: 2390645
- Website: www.rockvillemd.gov

Rockville is a city in and the county seat of Montgomery County, Maryland, United States, and is part of the Washington metropolitan area. The 2020 census tabulated Rockville's population at 67,117, making it the fourth most populous incorporated city in Maryland.

Rockville, along with neighboring Gaithersburg and Bethesda, is at the core of the Interstate 270 Technology Corridor which is home to numerous software and biotechnology companies as well as several federal government institutions. The city, one of the major retail hubs in Montgomery County, has several upscale regional shopping centers.

== History ==
=== Early history ===
Situated in the Piedmont region and crossed by three creeks (Rock Creek, Cabin John Creek, and Watts Branch), the area that became Rockville provided a favorable environment for seasonally mobile Native American communities as early as 8000 BC. The waterways were used for travel and hunting and provided refuge for the people associated with the Piscataway Confederacy.

By the first millennium BC, some groups had established year-round agricultural villages in the region. These communities cultivated native flora, including sunflowers and marsh elder. During the Late Woodland period, communities associated by archaeologists with the Montgomery Complex inhabited the central Potomac region. By around AD 1200, these early groups (dubbed Montgomery Indians by later archaeologists) were increasingly drawn into conflict with the Seneca and Susquehannock peoples who had migrated south from Pennsylvania and New York. Within the present-day boundaries of the city, six prehistoric sites have been uncovered and documented, along with numerous artifacts several thousand years old. By 1700, pressure from European colonists had displaced the majority of these original inhabitants.

Indigenous peoples established a trail along the high ground, known as Sinequa Trail, which is now downtown Rockville. The Maryland Assembly later established a standard width of 20 feet (6.1 m) for major thoroughfares, and the route developed into the Rock Creek Main Road, also known as the Great Road. In the mid-18th century, Lawrence Owen opened a small inn on the road. The place, known as Owen's Ordinary, took on greater prominence when, on April 14, 1755, Major General Edward Braddock stopped at Owen's Ordinary on a start of a mission from George Town (now Washington, D.C.) to press British claims of the western frontier. The location of the road, near the present Rockville Pike, was strategically located on higher ground, making it dry year-round.

=== 18th century ===
The first land patents in the Rockville area were obtained by Arthur Nelson between 1717 and 1735. Within three decades, the first permanent buildings in what would become the center of Rockville were established on this land. Still a part of Prince George's County at this time, the growth of Daniel Dulaney's Frederick Town prompted the separation of the western portion of the county, including Rockville, into Frederick County in 1748.

Being a small, unincorporated town, early Rockville was known by a variety of names, including Owen's Ordinary, Hungerford's Tavern, and Daley's Tavern. The first recorded mention of the settlement later known as Rockville dates to the Braddock Expedition in 1755. On April 14, one of the approximately 2,000 men who were accompanying General Braddock through wrote the following: "we marched to larance Owings or Owings Oardianary, a Single House, it being 18 miles and very dirty." Owen's Ordinary was a small rest stop on Rock Creek Main Road (later the Rockville Pike), which stretched from George Town to Frederick Town, and was then one of the largest thoroughfares in the colony of Maryland.

On September 6, 1776, the Maryland Constitutional Convention agreed to a proposal introduced by Thomas Sprigg Wootton wherein Frederick County, the largest and most populous county in Maryland, would be divided into three smaller subdivisions. The southern portion of the county, of which Rockville was a part, was named Montgomery County. The most populous and prosperous urban center in this new county was George Town, but its location at the far southern edge rendered it worthless as a seat of local government. Rockville, a small but centrally located and well-traveled town, was chosen as the seat. At the time, Rockville did not have a name; it was generally called Hungerford's Tavern, after the well-known tavern in it. After being named the county seat, the village was referred to by all as Montgomery Court House. The tavern served as the county courthouse, and it held its first such proceedings on May 20, 1777.

In 1784, William Prather Williams, a local landowner, hired a surveyor to lay out much of the town. In his honor, many took to calling the town Williamsburg. In practice, however, Williamsburg and Montgomery Court House were used interchangeably. Rockville came to greater prominence when Montgomery County was created and later when George Town was ceded to the federal government to create the District of Columbia.

The first post office opened on August 19, 1794, with Thomas P. Wilson serving as postmaster.

=== 19th century ===
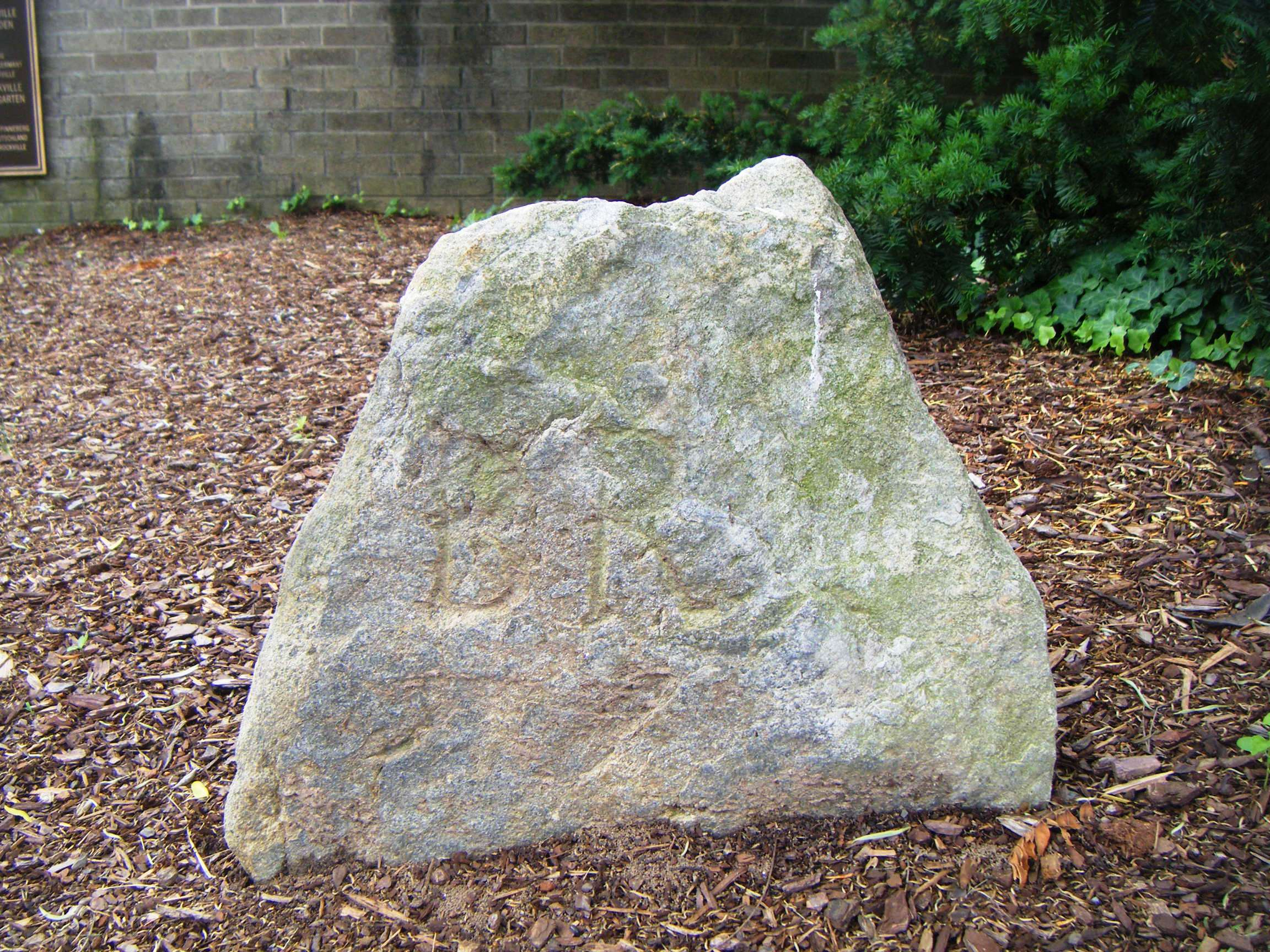
Stone marker on corner of Vinson Street and Maryland Avenue, placed there in 1803 when Rockville's streets were laid out. "BR" stands for "Beginning of Rockville".

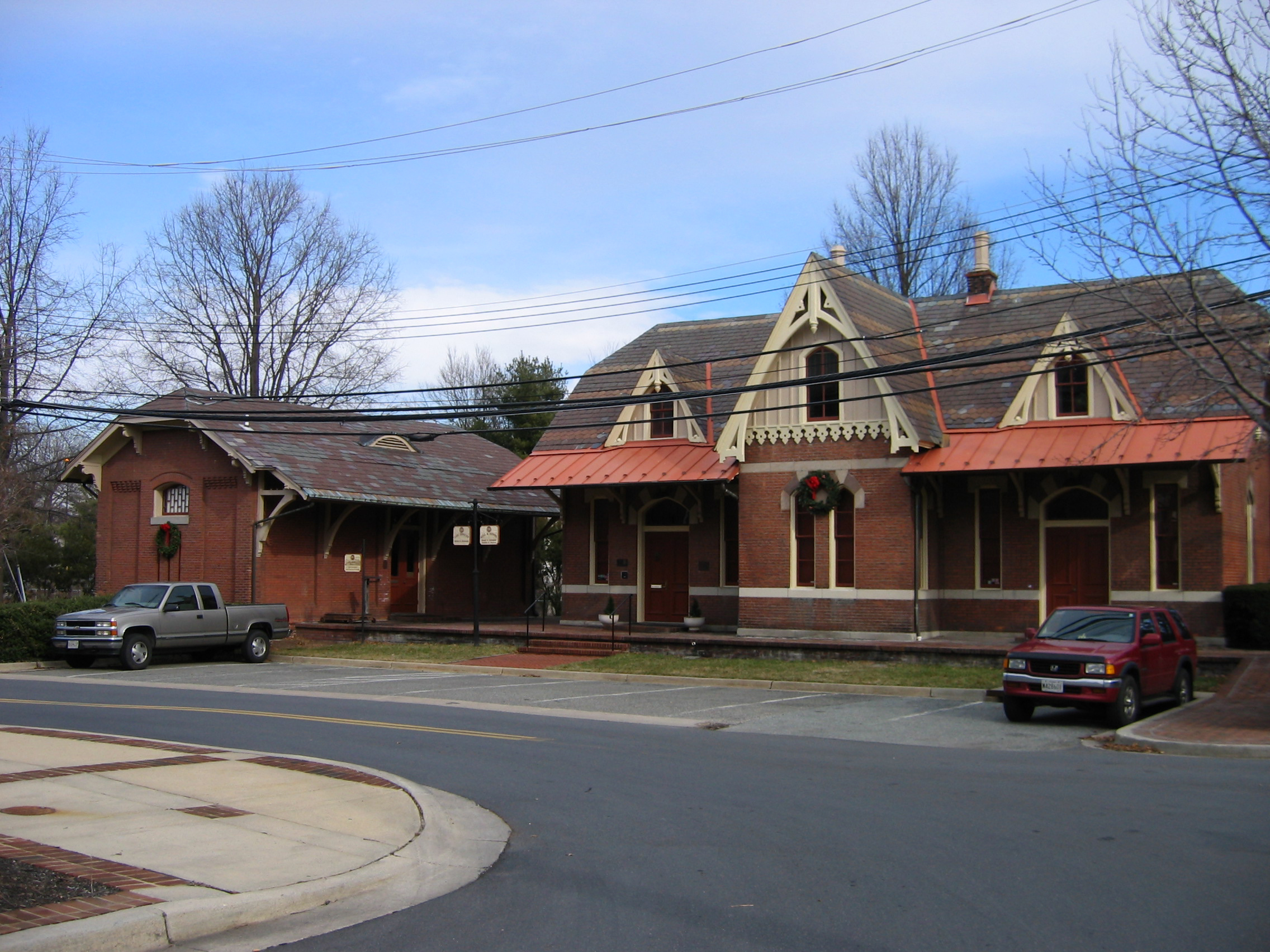
Rockville Railroad Station, built in 1873

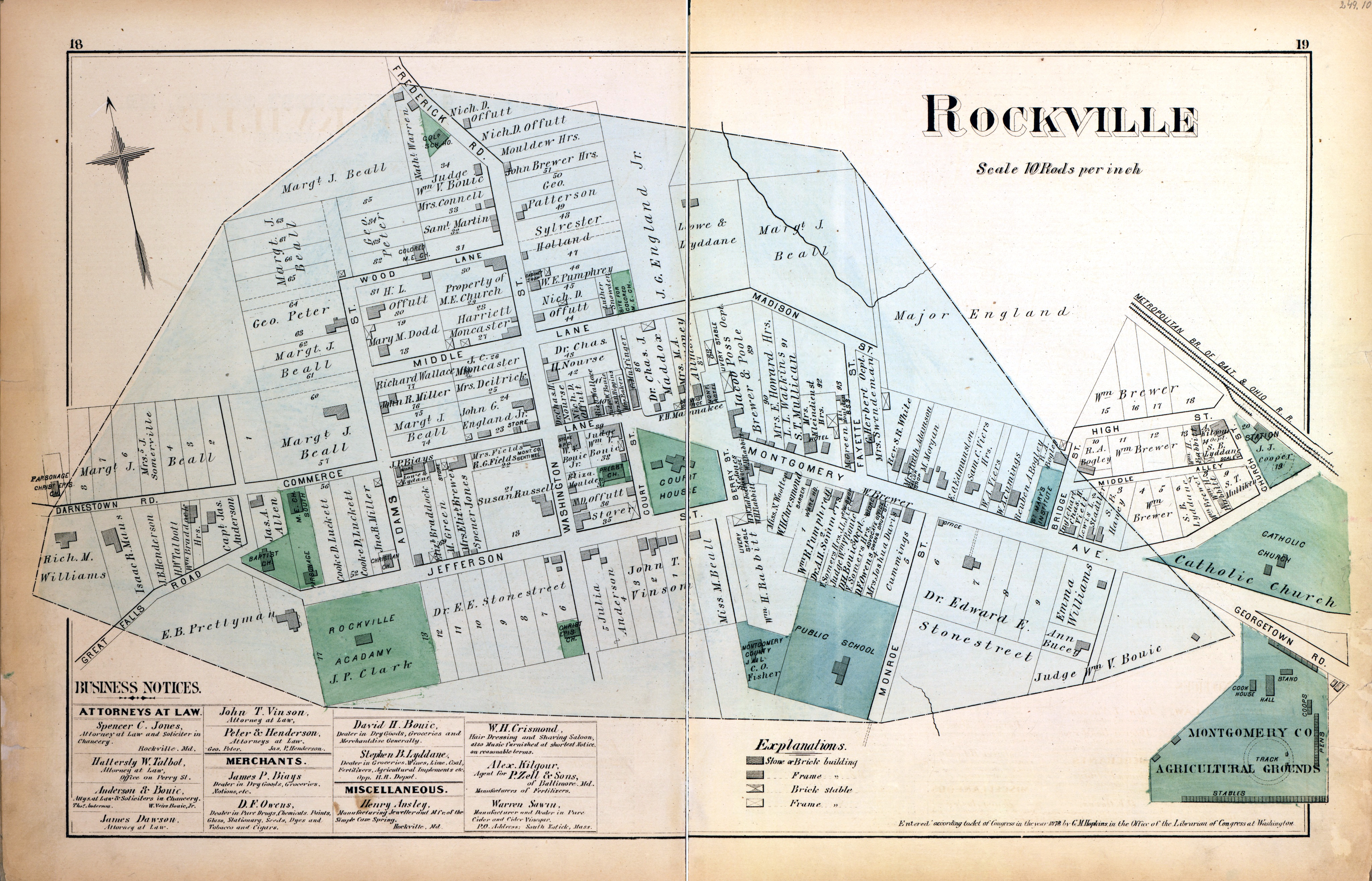
Rockville in 1879

A proposal to name the town Wattsville, after the nearby Watts Branch, failed because the stream was later considered too small to give its name to the town. On July 16, 1803, the area was officially entered into the county land records with the name "Rockville", derived from Rock Creek. Nevertheless, the name Montgomery Court House continued to appear on maps and other documents through the 1820s.

By petition of Rockville's citizens, the Maryland General Assembly incorporated the town of Rockville on March 10, 1860. During the American Civil War, General George B. McClellan stayed at the Beall Dawson house in 1862. In addition, General J.E.B. Stuart and an army of 8,000 Confederate cavalrymen marched through and occupied Rockville on June 28, 1863, while on their way to Gettysburg and stayed at the Prettyman house. Jubal Anderson Early also crossed through Rockville on his way to and from his 1864 attack on Washington.

In 1913, on the birthday of Jefferson Davis, the United Daughters of the Confederacy erected a statue near the Rockville courthouse dedicated to Confederate soldiers from Montgomery County. The monument was removed in 2017 as part of a wave of removals of Confederate monuments and memorials in response to the 2015 Charleston church shooting; its base now stands by White's Ferry.

In 1873, the Baltimore and Ohio Railroad extended its Metropolitan Branch to Rockville, connecting the city by rail to Washington, D.C.

In July 1891, the Tennallytown and Rockville Railway brought trolley service to the city. The line connected to the Georgetown and Tennallytown Railway terminus at Western Avenue and Wisconsin Avenue, and thence to downtown Washington, D.C.

=== 20th century ===
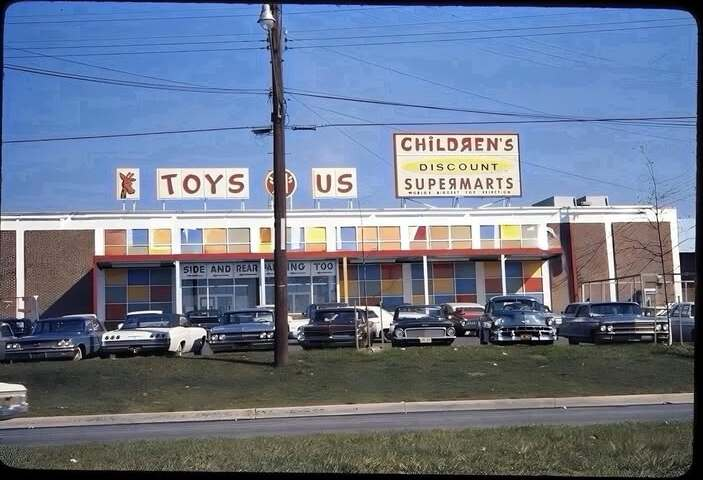
Rockville Pike in 1966

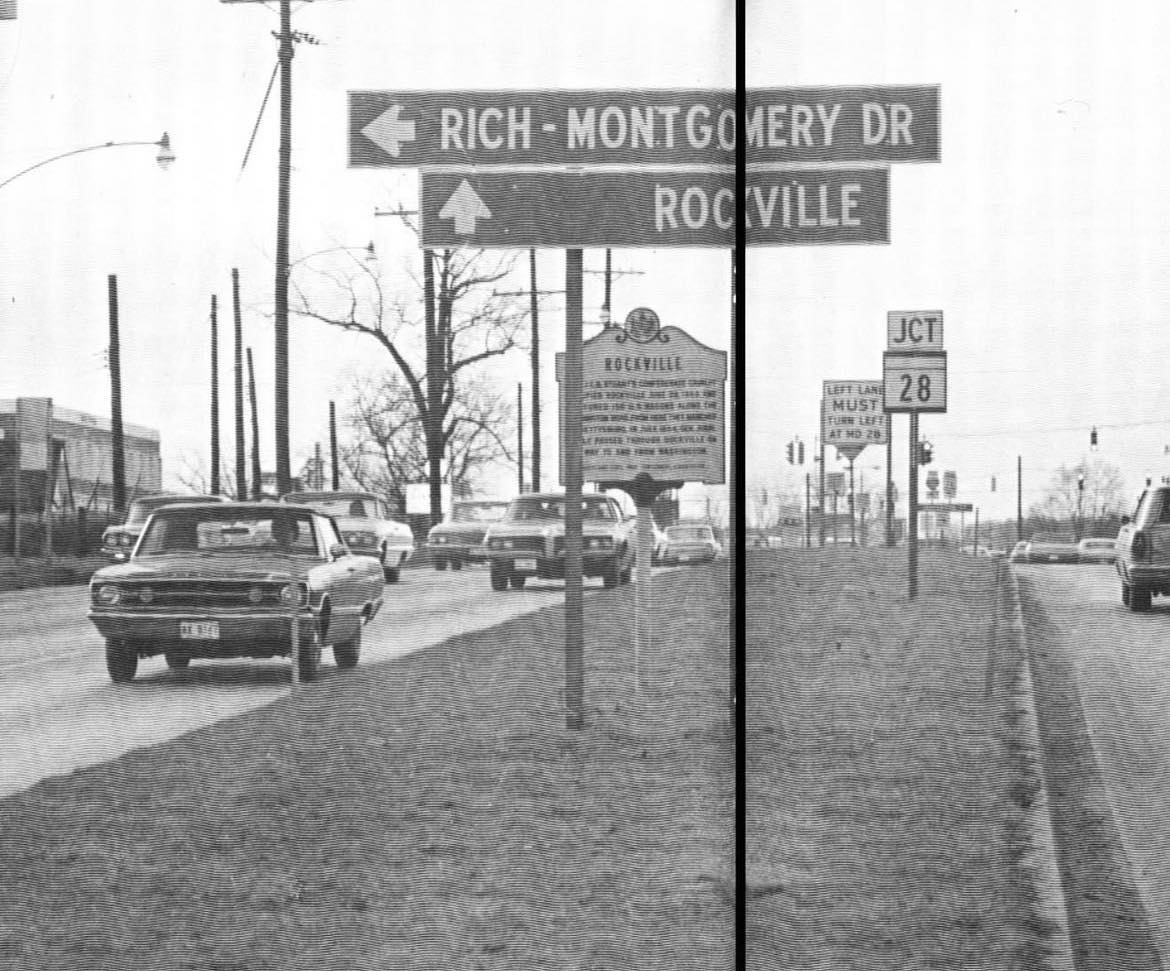
Downtown Rockville in 1970

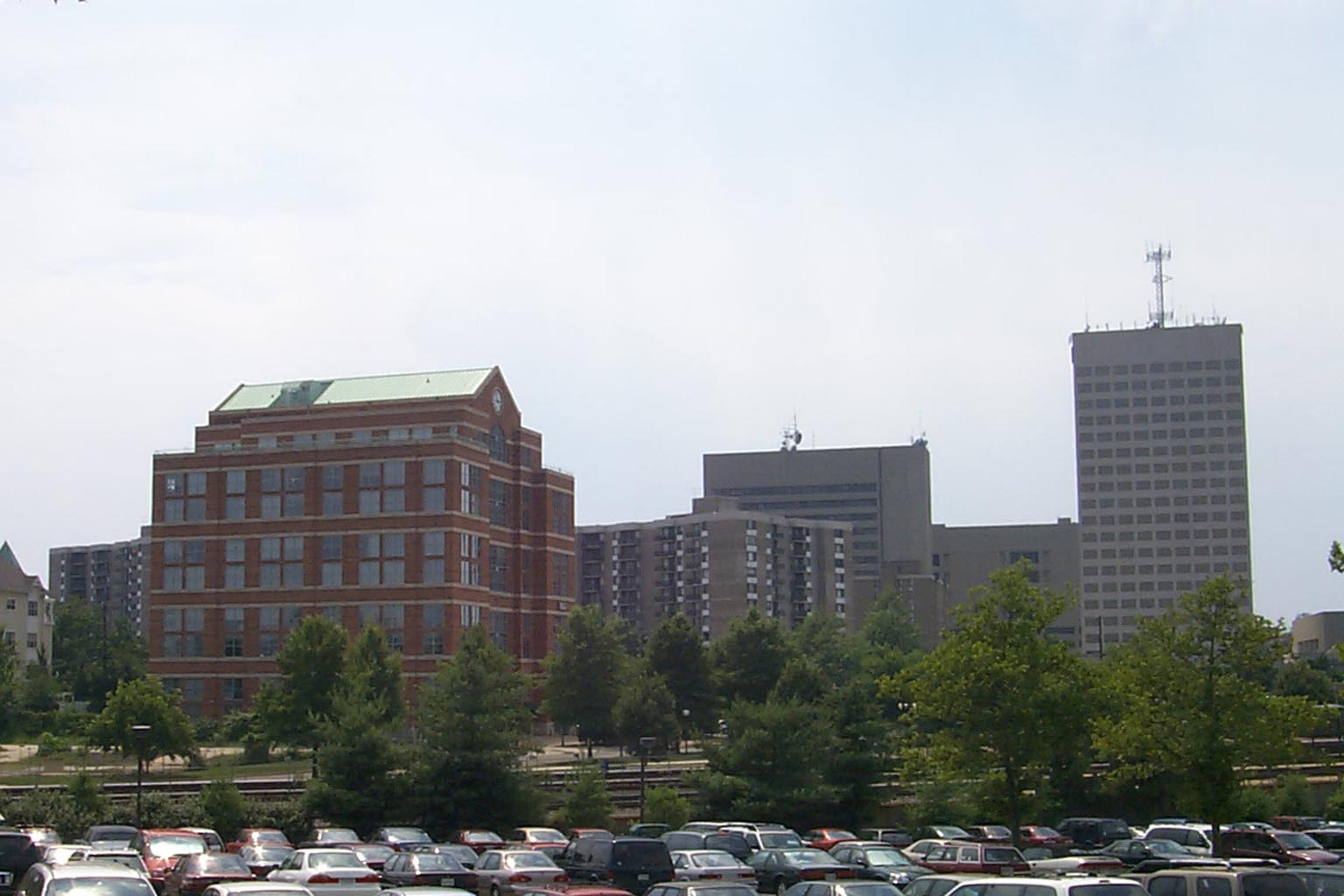
Downtown Rockville in 2001

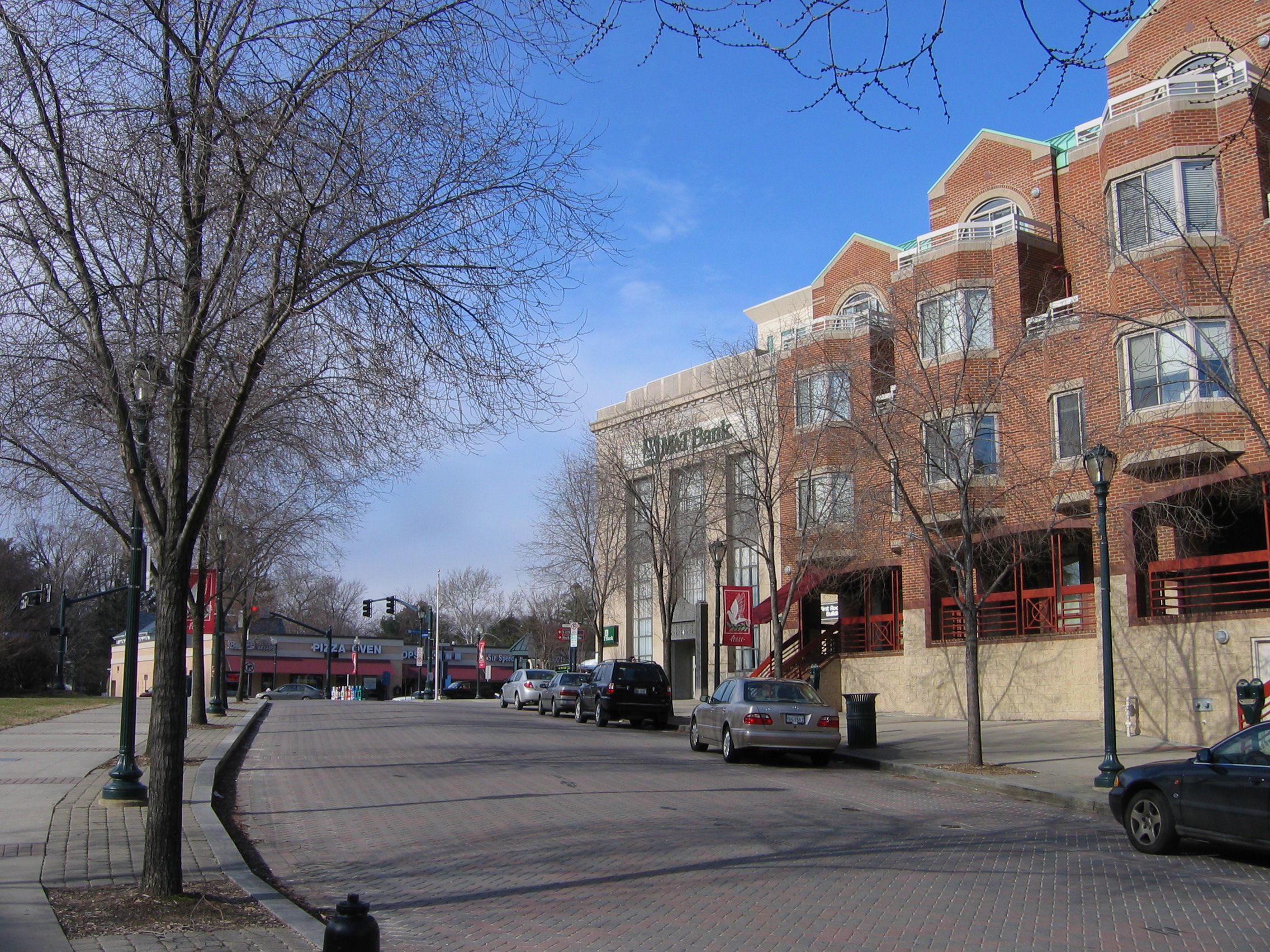
Rockville Town Center in 2006

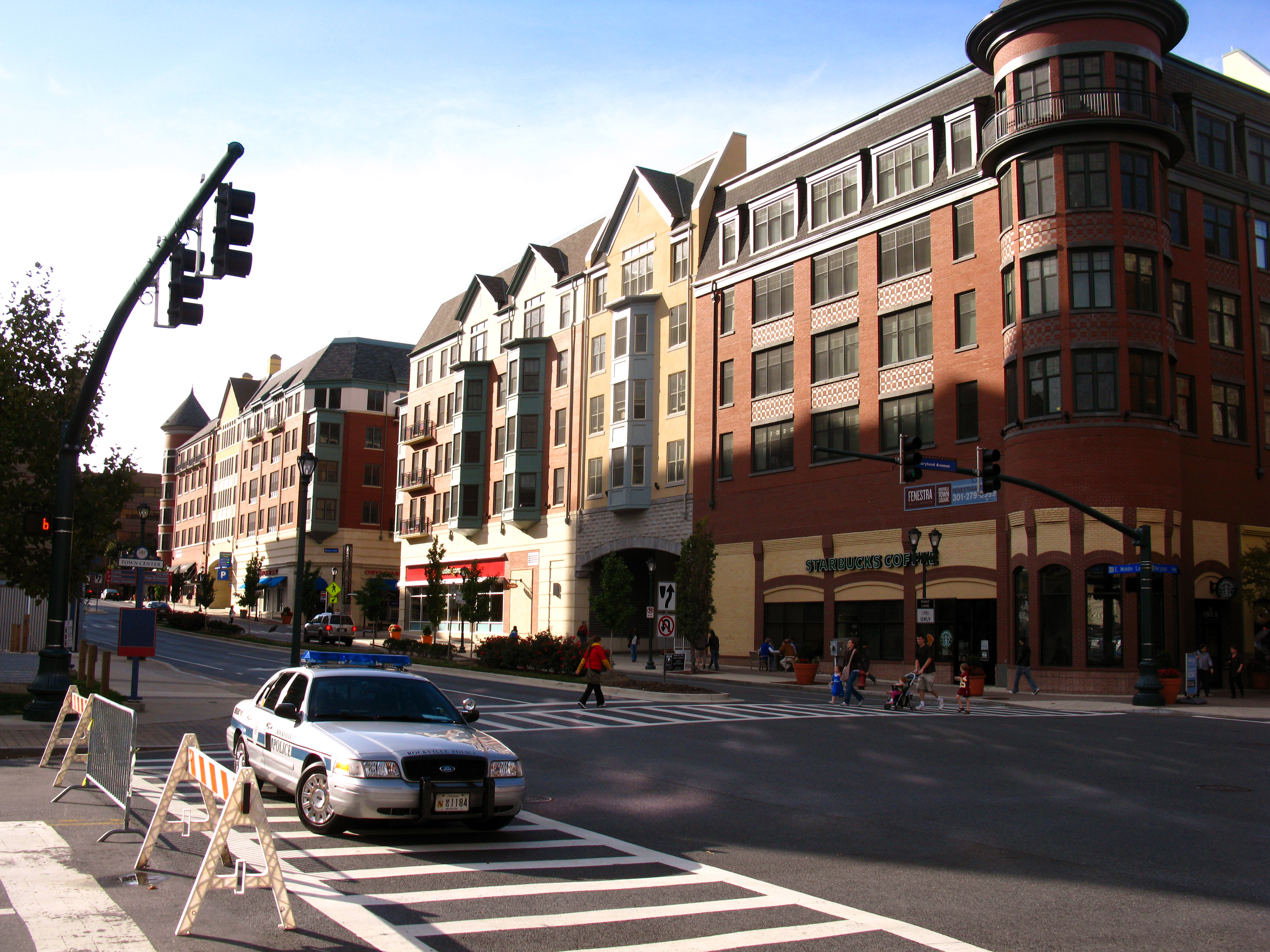
Downtown Rockville in 2009

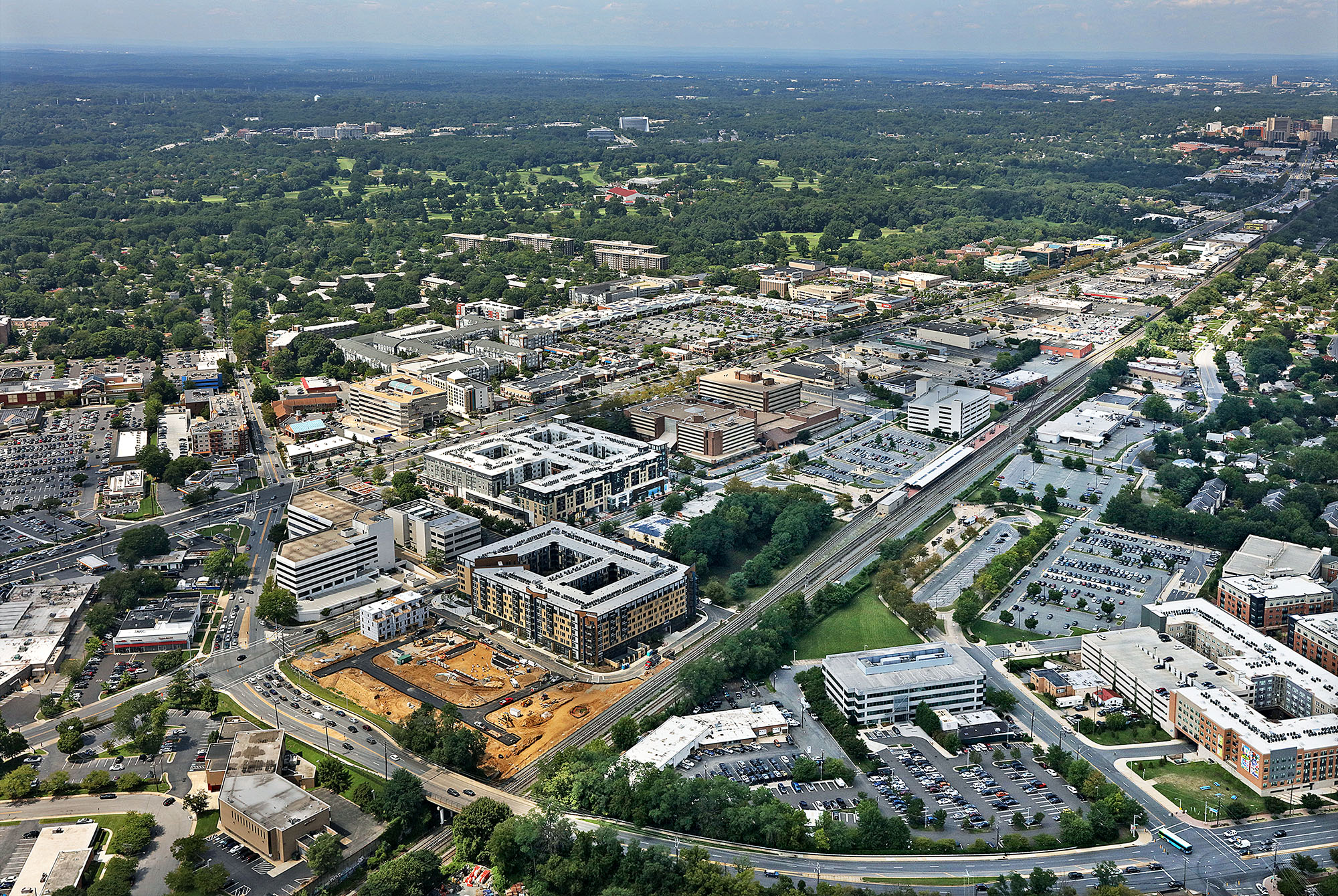
The Twinbrook Metro station and surrounding area, looking northwest in 2018

Trolley service operated for four decades, until, eclipsed by the growing usage of the automobile, service was halted in August 1935. The Blue Ridge Transportation Company provided bus service for Rockville and Montgomery County from 1924 through 1955. After 1955, Rockville would not see a concerted effort to develop a public transportation infrastructure until the 1970s, when the Washington Metropolitan Area Transit Authority (WMATA) began work to extend the Washington Metro into Rockville and extended Metrobus service into Montgomery County. The Rockville station of Washington Metro began service on July 25, 1984, and the Twinbrook station began service on December 15, 1984. Metrobus service was supplemented by Montgomery County's own Ride On bus service starting in 1979. MARC, Maryland's Rail Commuter service, serves Rockville with its Brunswick line. From Rockville MARC provides service to Washington Union Station (southbound), and Frederick and Martinsburg, West Virginia (northbound), as well as intermediate points. Amtrak, the national passenger rail system, provides service from Rockville to Chicago and Washington, D.C.

In the mid-20th century, Rockville grew substantially, especially following the annexation of the Twinbrook subdivision in 1949, which added hundreds of new homes and thousands of new residents to the city. In 1954, Congressional Airport closed, and its land was sold to developers to build residences and a commercial shopping center. The shopping center, named Congressional Plaza, opened in 1958. These new areas provided affordable housing and grew quickly with young families eager to start their lives following World War II.

During the Cold War, it was considered safer to remain in Rockville than to evacuate during a hypothetical nuclear attack on Washington, D.C. Bomb shelters were built, including the largest one at Glenview Mansion and 15 other locations. The I-270 highway was designated as an emergency aircraft landing strip. Two Nike missile launcher sites were located on Muddy Branch and Snouffer School Roads until the mid-1970s.

In 1975, F. Scott Fitzgerald and Zelda Fitzgerald's caskets were reinterred at St. Mary's Catholic Church in Rockville, where his father, Edward, and a number of Key family members had been buried.

From the 1960s, Rockville's town center, formerly one of the area's commercial centers, suffered from a period of decline. Rockville soon became the first city in Maryland to enter into a government funded urban renewal program. This resulted in the demolition of most of the original business district. Included in the plan was the unsuccessful Rockville Mall, which failed to attract either major retailers or customers and was demolished in 1994, various government buildings such as the new Montgomery County Judicial Center (opened 1982), and a reorganization of the road plan near the courthouse. The once-promising plan was for the most part a disappointment. Although efforts to restore the town center continue, the majority of the city's economic activity moved to Rockville Pike (MD Route 355/Wisconsin Avenue). The U.S. Nuclear Regulatory Commission's headquarters is on the Pike, just south of the city's corporate limits.

The R.E.M. song "(Don't Go Back To) Rockville", released in 1984, was written by Mike Mills about not wanting his girlfriend Ingrid Schorr to return to Rockville, Maryland.

=== 21st century ===
In 2004, Rockville Mayor Larry Giammo announced plans to renovate Rockville Town Square, including building new stores and housing and moving the city's library. As of 2007, the new Rockville Town Center includes shops, restaurants, condominiums and apartments, as well as stages, fountains and the new Rockville Memorial Library.

The city is closely associated with the neighboring towns of Kensington and North Bethesda, an unincorporated census-designated place. The Music Center at Strathmore, an arts and theater center, opened in February 2005 in the latter of these two areas and is the second home of the Baltimore Symphony Orchestra. The Fitzgerald Theatre in Rockville Civic Center Park has provided diverse entertainment since 1960. In 1998, Regal Cinemas opened in Town Center, and the city annexed 900 acres of land.

The city has a brass band in the British style.

=== Historic places ===
Historic structures on the Register in and around downtown Rockville are:

- Beall–Dawson House (1815)
- Bingham-Brewer House (1821)
- Dawson Farm (1874)
- Glenview Mansion (1926)
- Montgomery County Courthouse Historic District (1939)
- New Mark Commons (1967)
- Old St. Mary's Church (1817)
- Rockville Park Historic District (1884)
- Rockville Railroad Station (1873)
- West Montgomery Avenue Historic District (1880)

==== Rockville vicinity ====
- Montrose Schoolhouse (1909)

== Geography ==
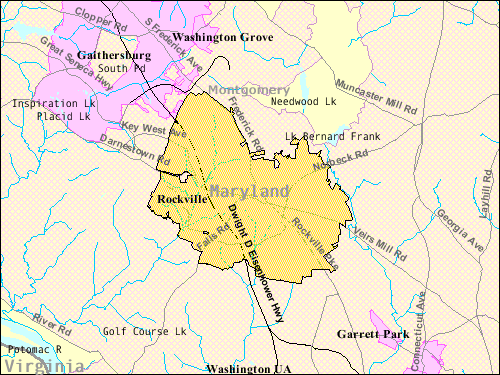
Boundaries of Rockville in 2004

According to the United States Census Bureau, the city has a total area of 13.57 square miles (35.15 km^{2}), of which 13.51 square miles (34.99 km^{2}) is land and 0.06 square miles (0.16 km^{2}) is water.

=== Climate ===
The climate in this area is characterized by hot, humid summers and generally mild to cool winters. According to the Köppen Climate Classification system Rockville has a humid subtropical climate, abbreviated "Cfa" on climate maps. According to the United States Department of Agriculture, Rockville is in hardiness zone 7a, meaning that the average annual minimum winter temperature is 0 to 5 °F (−18 to −15 °C). The average first frost occurs on October 21, and the average final frost occurs on April 16.

Climate data for Rockville, Maryland, 1981–2010 normals, extremes 1907–2007
Month	Jan	Feb	Mar	Apr	May	Jun	Jul	Aug	Sep	Oct	Nov	Dec	Year
Record high °F (°C)	78 (26)	82 (28)	89 (32)	100 (38)	97 (36)	102 (39)	105 (41)	104 (40)	99 (37)	93 (34)	85 (29)	80 (27)	105 (41)
Mean maximum °F (°C)	62.7 (17.1)	67.4 (19.7)	77.8 (25.4)	84.9 (29.4)	89.0 (31.7)	92.5 (33.6)	95.0 (35.0)	93.0 (33.9)	89.5 (31.9)	80.7 (27.1)	74.3 (23.5)	65.4 (18.6)	96.2 (35.7)
Mean daily maximum °F (°C)	40.4 (4.7)	43.7 (6.5)	53.3 (11.8)	64.5 (18.1)	72.8 (22.7)	81.3 (27.4)	85.0 (29.4)	83.2 (28.4)	75.8 (24.3)	64.8 (18.2)	54.7 (12.6)	43.8 (6.6)	63.6 (17.6)
Daily mean °F (°C)	33.7 (0.9)	36.4 (2.4)	44.8 (7.1)	55.2 (12.9)	63.8 (17.7)	72.8 (22.7)	76.9 (24.9)	75.2 (24.0)	67.7 (19.8)	56.2 (13.4)	46.9 (8.3)	37.2 (2.9)	55.6 (13.1)
Mean daily minimum °F (°C)	27.0 (−2.8)	29.2 (−1.6)	36.2 (2.3)	45.9 (7.7)	54.8 (12.7)	64.3 (17.9)	68.8 (20.4)	67.2 (19.6)	59.7 (15.4)	47.7 (8.7)	39.1 (3.9)	30.5 (−0.8)	47.5 (8.6)
Mean minimum °F (°C)	5.4 (−14.8)	8.5 (−13.1)	16.2 (−8.8)	27.4 (−2.6)	36.8 (2.7)	45.8 (7.7)	52.2 (11.2)	50.7 (10.4)	40.4 (4.7)	29.4 (−1.4)	21.0 (−6.1)	11.9 (−11.2)	1.8 (−16.8)
Record low °F (°C)	−13 (−25)	−12 (−24)	1 (−17)	18 (−8)	28 (−2)	35 (2)	38 (3)	39 (4)	28 (−2)	20 (−7)	10 (−12)	−12 (−24)	−13 (−25)
Average precipitation inches (mm)	2.88 (73)	2.71 (69)	3.61 (92)	3.22 (82)	4.13 (105)	3.49 (89)	3.67 (93)	2.90 (74)	3.83 (97)	3.29 (84)	3.53 (90)	3.00 (76)	40.26 (1,024)
Average snowfall inches (cm)	8.3 (21)	3.4 (8.6)	2.6 (6.6)	0.1 (0.25)	0.0 (0.0)	0.0 (0.0)	0.0 (0.0)	0.0 (0.0)	0.0 (0.0)	0.0 (0.0)	0.5 (1.3)	2.2 (5.6)	17.1 (43.35)
Average precipitation days (≥ 0.01 in)	9.7	8.1	10.7	10.1	11.8	9.7	10.0	7.8	9.0	8.0	8.2	8.9	112.0
Average snowy days (≥ 0.1 in)	3.0	1.9	1.1	0.1	0.0	0.0	0.0	0.0	0.0	0.0	0.3	1.3	7.7
Source: NOAA (mean maxima/minima 1971–2000)

== Demographics ==
Historical population
Census	Pop.	Note	%±
1900	1,110		—
1910	1,181		6.4%
1920	1,145		−3.0%
1930	1,422		24.2%
1940	2,047		44.0%
1950	6,934		238.7%
1960	26,090		276.3%
1970	42,739		63.8%
1980	43,811		2.5%
1990	44,835		2.3%
2000	47,388		5.7%
2010	61,209		29.2%
2020	67,117		9.7%
2024 (est.)	68,417		1.9%
U.S. Decennial Census; 2010–2020; 2024 estimate

=== Racial and ethnic composition ===
Rockville city, Maryland – racial and ethnic composition Note: the US Census treats Hispanic/Latino as an ethnic category. This table excludes Latinos from the racial categories and assigns them to a separate category. Hispanics/Latinos may be of any race.
Race / ethnicity (NH = Non-Hispanic)	Pop 2000	Pop 2010	Pop 2020	% 2000	% 2010	% 2020
White alone (NH)	29,342	32,344	30,227	61.92%	52.84%	45.04%
Black or African American alone (NH)	4,200	5,570	7,119	8.86%	9.10%	10.61%
Native American or Alaska Native alone (NH)	133	92	104	0.28%	0.15%	0.15%
Asian alone (NH)	7,002	12,524	14,381	14.78%	20.46%	21.43%
Native Hawaiian or Pacific Islander alone (NH)	11	25	35	0.02%	0.04%	0.05%
Other race alone (NH)	140	217	547	0.30%	0.35%	0.81%
Mixed-race or multiracial (NH)	1,031	1,656	3,370	2.18%	2.71%	5.02%
Hispanic or Latino (any race)	5,529	8,781	11,334	11.67%	14.35%	16.89%
Total	47,388	61,209	67,117	100.00%	100.00%	100.00%

=== 2020 census ===
As of the 2020 census, Rockville had a population of 67,117. The median age was 39.1 years. 20.4% of residents were under the age of 18 and 17.0% of residents were 65 years of age or older. For every 100 females there were 90.5 males, and for every 100 females age 18 and over there were 87.6 males age 18 and over.

100.0% of residents lived in urban areas, while 0.0% lived in rural areas.

There were 26,604 households in Rockville, of which 30.6% had children under the age of 18 living in them. Of all households, 48.6% were married-couple households, 16.7% were households with a male householder and no spouse or partner present, and 29.5% were households with a female householder and no spouse or partner present. About 28.8% of all households were made up of individuals and 11.0% had someone living alone who was 65 years of age or older.

There were 27,953 housing units, of which 4.8% were vacant. The homeowner vacancy rate was 1.0% and the rental vacancy rate was 5.5%.

Racial composition as of the 2020 census
Race	Number	Percentage
White	31,837	47.4%
Black or African American	7,329	10.9%
American Indian and Alaska Native	394	0.6%
Asian	14,477	21.6%
Native Hawaiian and Other Pacific Islander	40	0.1%
Some other race	5,302	7.9%
Two or more races	7,738	11.5%

=== 2010 census ===
As of the census of 2010, there were 61,209 people, 23,686 households, and 15,524 families residing in the city. The population density was 4,530.6 inhabitants per square mile (1,749.3/km^{2}). There were 25,199 housing units at an average density of 1,865.2 per square mile (720.2/km^{2}). The racial makeup of the city was 60.4% White (52.8% non-Hispanic white), 9.6% African American, 0.3% Native American, 20.6% Asian, 5.3% from other races, and 3.8% from two or more races. Hispanic or Latino people of any race were 14.3% of the population.

There were 23,686 households, of which 31.8% had children under the age of 18 living with them, 52.3% were married couples living together, 9.9% had a female householder with no husband present, 3.4% had a male householder with no wife present, and 34.5% were non-families. 27.0% of all households were made up of individuals, and 9.5% had someone living alone who was 65 years of age or older. The average household size was 2.54 and the average family size was 3.08.

The median age in the city was 38.7 years. And 21.5% of residents were under the age of 18; 7.2% were between the ages of 18 and 24; 31.1% were from 25 to 44; 26.3% were from 45 to 64; and 14% were 65 years of age or older. The gender makeup of the city was 47.9% male and 52.1% female.

=== Income ===
The median income for a household in the city as of 2020 was $111,797. As of 2007, the median income for a family was $98,257. Males had a median income of $53,764 versus $38,788 for females. In 2015, the per capita income for the city was $49,399. 7.8% of the population and 5.6% of families were below the poverty line. Out of the total population, 8.9% of those under the age of 18 and 7.9% of those 65 and older were living below the poverty line.

== Economy ==
Bethesda Softworks/ZeniMax Media is headquartered in Rockville.

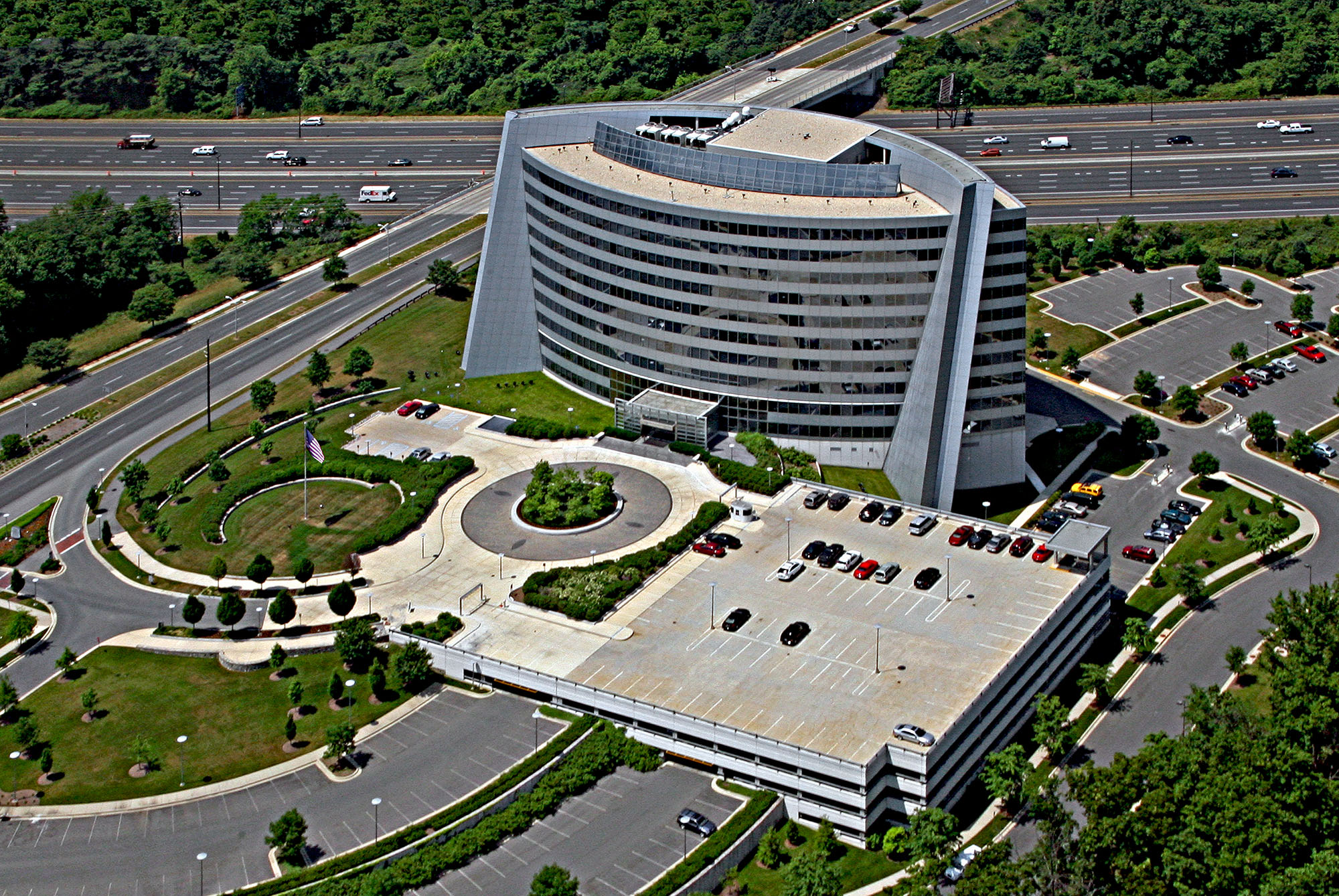
Westward view of the Tower Building in Rockville

=== Largest employers ===
According to the city's 2025 Annual Comprehensive Financial Report, the top employers in the city are:

Rank	Employer	No. of employees
1	Montgomery County Government	11,100
2	Montgomery County Board of Education	6,000
3	Montgomery College	1,700
4	Westat	1,600
5	City of Rockville	873
*	Lockheed Martin Information Systems	*
*	U.S. Nuclear Regulatory Commission	*
6	Pepco	645
7	Library Systems & Services, LLC	617
8	Meso Scale Discovery LLC	475
*	Charles E. Smith Life Communities	*
*	Booz Allen Hamilton	*
9	The Emmes Corporation	440
10	Mariam Inc.	400
*	United States Pharmacopeial Convention	*
Total		23,850

*Not applicable for the fiscal year presented.

== Sports ==
- Rockville Express, a Cal Ripken Sr. Collegiate Baseball League team, 2007 CRSCBL League Champions
- The city is also home to the Rockville Baseball Association, a youth baseball and softball organization that has offered programing every year since its founding in 1954.
- In addition, the city runs a number of recreational sports leagues for both adults and youths. These include softball, pickleball, soccer, kickball, and volleyball.

== Government ==
Presidential election results

Presidential election results in Rockville
Year	Democratic	Republican	Others
2024	77.3% 25,276	19.8% 6,457	2.9% 948
2020	79.5% 26,115	18.0% 5,899	2.5% 828
2016	73.9% 20,722	19.8% 5,555	6.3% 1,757

Rockville has a council-manager form of government.

In November 2023, Rockville voted in the 67th election for mayor and council, with voters electing Monique Ashton as mayor. Six councilmembers were also elected: Kate Fulton, Adam Van Grack, Izola (Zola) Shaw, David Myles, Marissa Valeri, and Barry Jackson.

=== Mayor ===
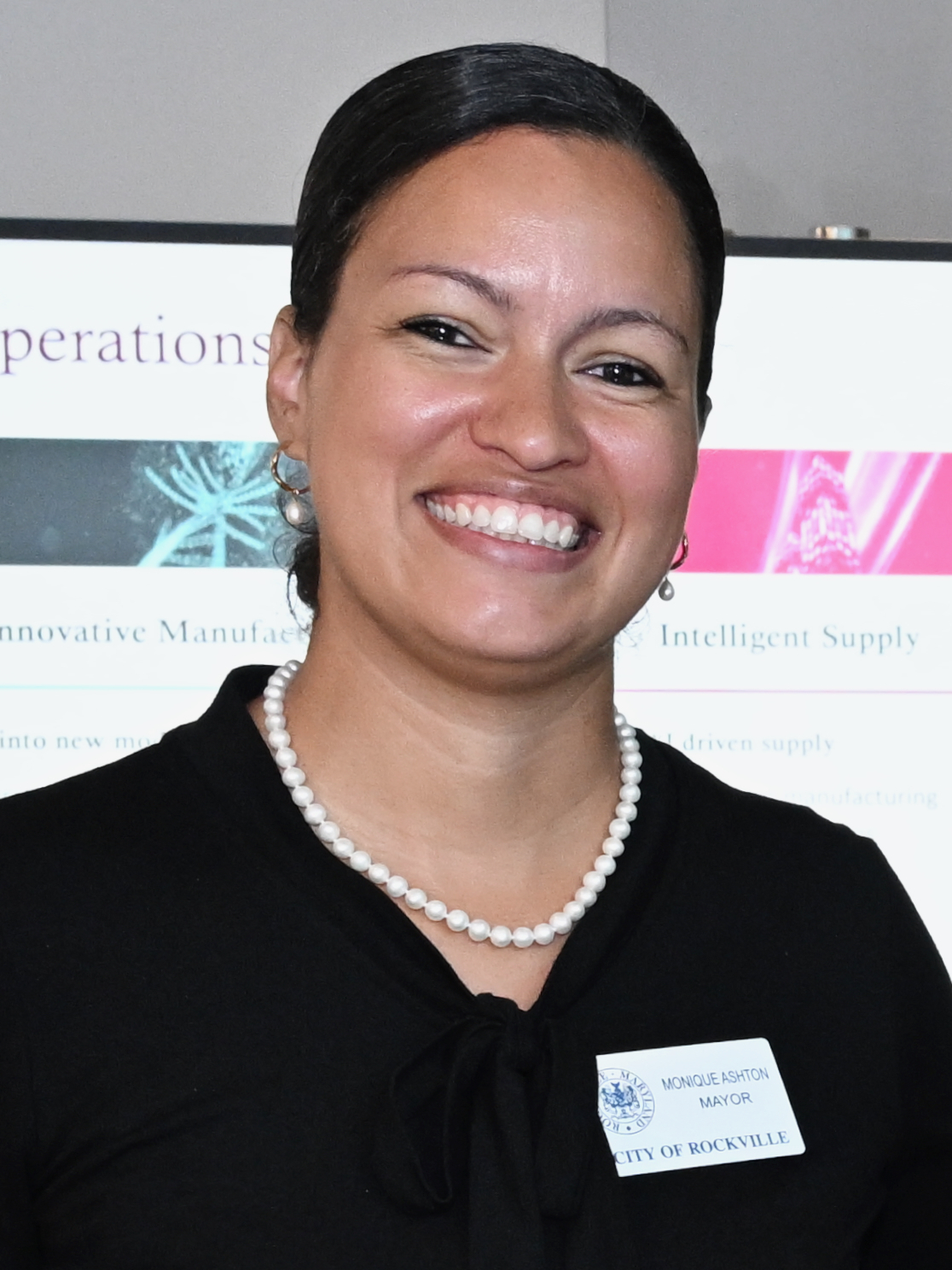
Monique Ashton (pictured in 2025) has served as the mayor since 2023.

The current mayor of Rockville is Monique Ashton.

Rockville was incorporated in 1860, but its early records were destroyed by Confederate soldiers in July 1864.

Past mayors of Rockville include:

Mayors of Rockville
Name	Tenure	Party	Notes
William V. Bouic	1888–1890	Democratic	
Daniel F. Owens	1890		
William V. Bouic	1890–1891		
Hattersley W. Talbott	1892–1893		
Jacob Poss	1893–1894		
John G. England	1894–1896		
Joseph Reading	1896–1898		
Spencer C. Jones	1898–1901		
Hattersley W. Talbott	1901–1906		
Lee Offutt	1906–1916		
Willis Burdette	1916–1918		
Lee Offutt	1918–1920		
O. M. Linthicum	1920–1924		
Charles G. Holland	1924–1926		
J. Roger Spates	1926–1932		
Douglas Blandford	1932–1946		
G. LaMar Kelly	1946–1952		
Daniel Weddle	1952–1954		
Dickran Y. Hovsepian	1954–1958		
Alexander J. Greene	1958–1962		
Frank A. Ecker	1962–1968		
Achilles M. Tuchtan	1968–1972		
Matthew J. McCartin	1972–1974		
William E. Hanna Jr.	1974–1982		
John R. Freeland	1982–1984		
Viola D. Hovesepian	1984–1985		Appointed mayor
Steven Van Grack	1985–1987	Independent	
Douglas M. Duncan	1987–1993		
James Coyle	1993–1995		
Rose G. Krasnow	1995–2001		
Larry Giammo	2001–2007	Independent	
Susan R. Hoffmann	2007–2009		
Phyllis R. Marcuccio	2009–2013		
Bridget Donnell Newton	2013–2023		
Monique M. Ashton	2023–present		

=== Representative body ===
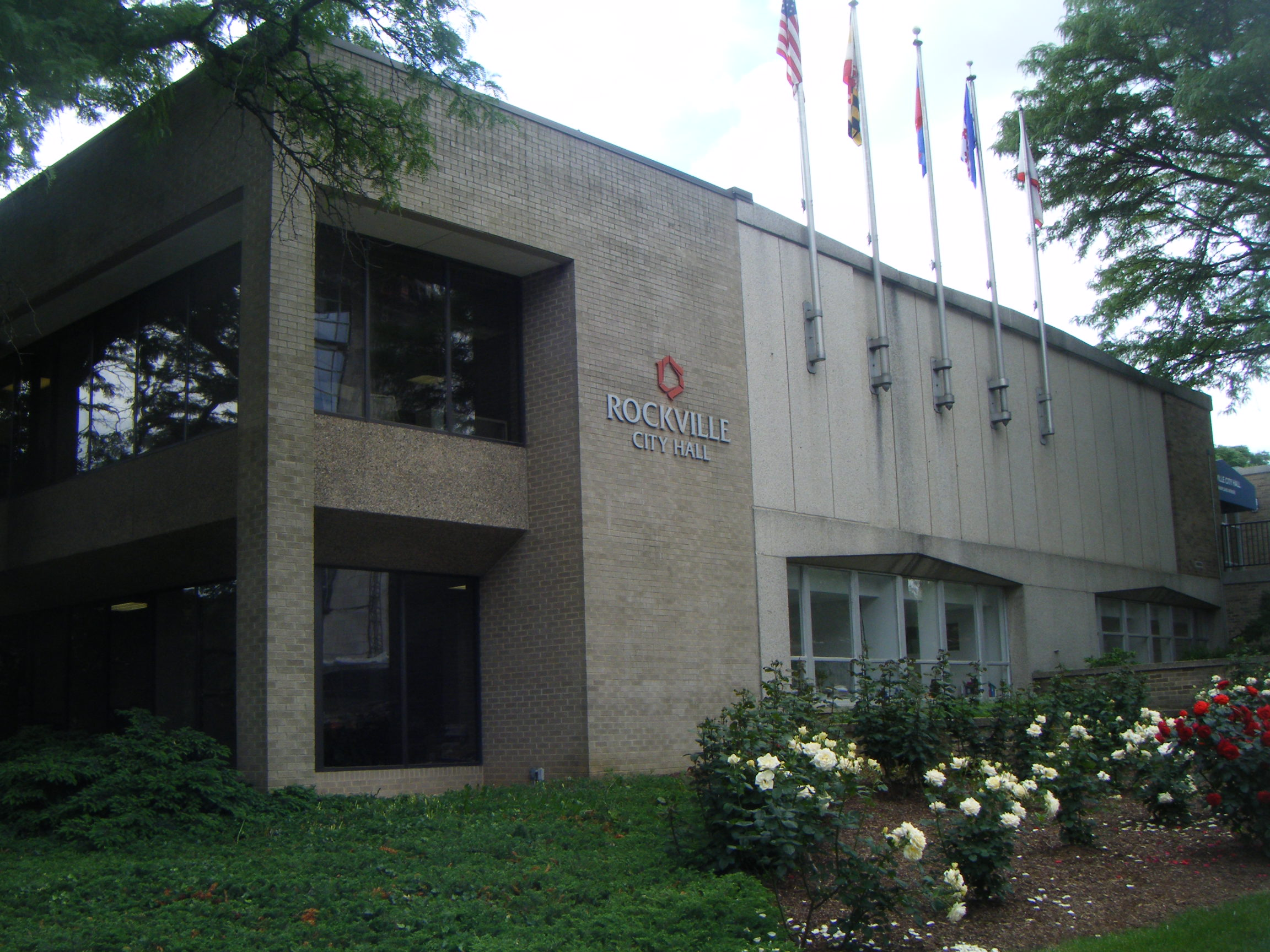
Rockville City Hall, 2010

Rockville has a four-member city council, whose members, along with the mayor, serve as the governing body of the city. In 2023, the council voted to expand from four members to six, along with the mayor.

== Education ==
Rockville is served by the Montgomery County Public Schools system. Public high schools in Rockville include Thomas S. Wootton High School, Richard Montgomery High School, and Rockville High School. Prior to integration in 1961, black students were educated at George Washington Carver High School in Rockville. The John L. Gildner Regional Institute for Children and Adolescents provides education for children with special educational needs.

St. Elizabeth Catholic School of the Roman Catholic Archdiocese of Washington is in Rockville.

Private schools located near Rockville (with Rockville postal addresses) include:

- Charles E. Smith Jewish Day School (North Bethesda)
- Melvin J. Berman Hebrew Academy (Aspen Hill)

Montrose Christian School in North Bethesda has closed.

=== Higher education ===
The Montgomery College (MC), main campus is located within Rockville and enrolls more than 15,000 students as of March 2019. The college is accredited by the Middle States Association of Colleges and Schools.

Additional institutions of higher education in Rockville include the University of Maryland Global Campus (main campus is in Adelphi, Maryland), the Johns Hopkins University Montgomery County Campus (main campus is in Baltimore), and the Universities at Shady Grove, a collaboration of nine Maryland public degree-granting institutions, all with Rockville addresses but outside the city limits.

== Transportation ==
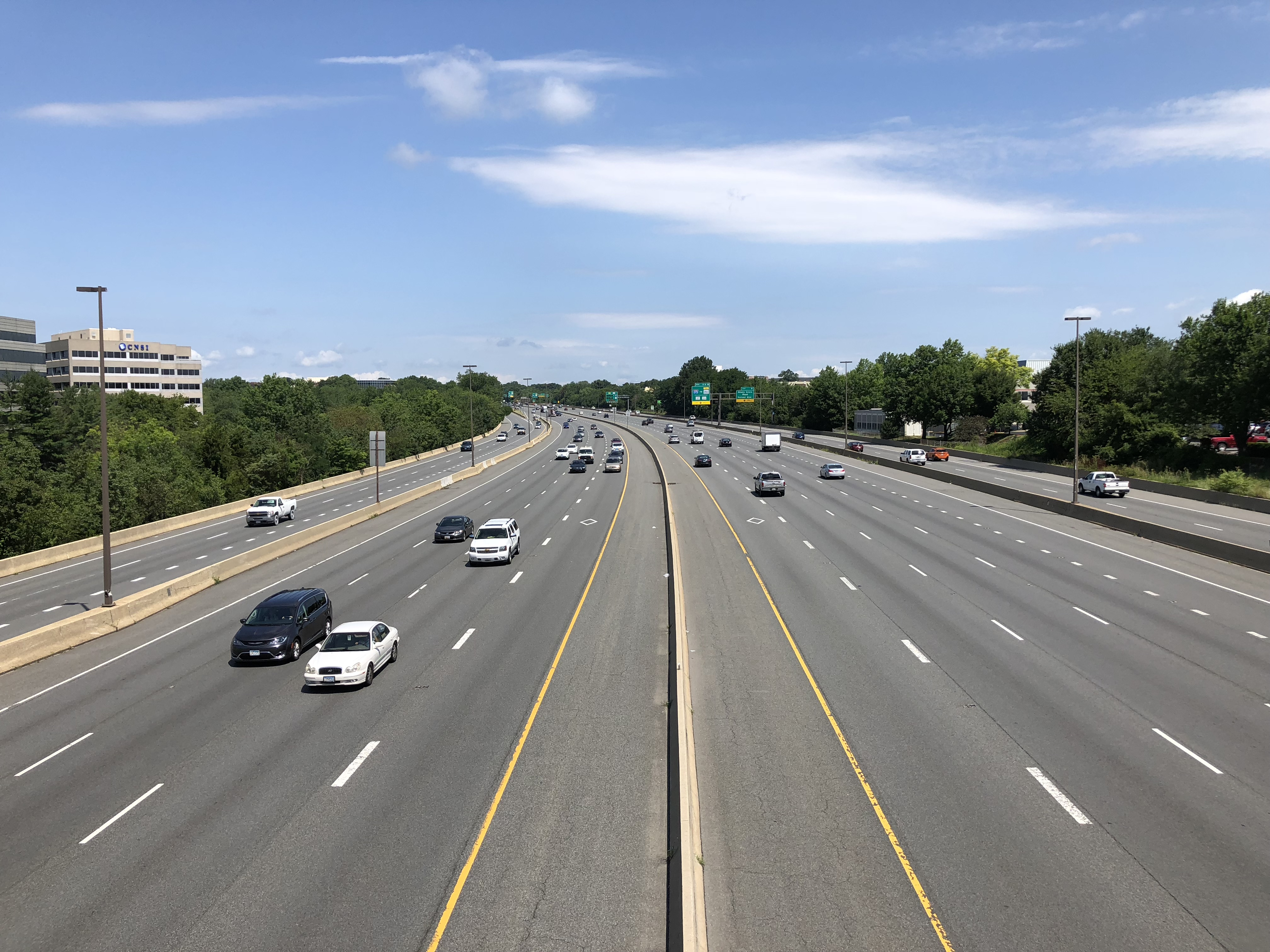
I-270 northbound in Rockville

=== Roads and highways ===
The most prominent highway directly serving Rockville is Interstate 270. I-270 is the main highway leading northwest out of metropolitan Washington, D.C., beginning at Interstate 495 (the Capital Beltway) and proceeding northwestward to Interstate 70 in Frederick. Maryland Route 355 was the precursor to I-270 and follows a parallel route, and now serves as the main commercial roadway through Rockville and neighboring communities. Other state highways serving Rockville directly include Maryland Route 28, Maryland Route 189, Maryland Route 586, Maryland Route 660 and Maryland Route 911. Interstate 370 and Maryland Route 200 do not directly enter the city, but pass just outside the city limits.

=== Public transportation ===
The Washington Metro Red Line rail system can be accessed at Rockville station and Twinbrook station. The Brunswick Line of the MARC commuter rail system runs to and from Washington, D.C., and can be accessed at Rockville Station. Amtrak trains also serve Rockville.

Bus service connects Rockville directly to the regional transit hub at Baltimore–Washington International Airport, and to downtown Baltimore via the Maryland Transit Administration ICC Bus and the Baltimore Light Rail. Ride On buses provides service within the city and to places within the county like Gaithersburg, Germantown, Clarksburg, Wheaton, and Silver Spring.

== Law enforcement ==
The city is served by the Rockville City Police Department, and is aided by the Montgomery County Police Department as directed by the relevant authorities.

== Leisure ==
The city operates Rockville Swim & Fitness Center. Its town center has a library, ice skating facility (in winter), and restaurants and shopping. The Rockville Memorial Library, part of the Montgomery Country Public Libraries system, offers books, databases, newspapers, magazines, and internet access.

== Notable people ==
- Tori Amos, singer, songwriter, and pianist
- Jamshid Amouzegar, former prime minister of Iran
- Dragoslav Avramović, former governor, National Bank of Yugoslavia in Serbia and Montenegro
- Jon Bell, soccer player
- BT, musician
- Gordy Coleman, Major League Baseball player
- Jerome Dyson (born 1987), former professional basketball player
- Pablo Eisenberg (1932–2022), scholar, social justice advocate, and tennis player
- Paul Goldstein (born 1976), tennis player
- Virginia Hall, spy and OSS operative
- Jamie Lee Henry, first openly transgender officer in the United States Armed Forces
- Elden Henson, actor, The Mighty Ducks and Hunger Games movie series
- Spike Jonze, film director
- Charles Lazarus, founder, Toys "R" Us
- Logic, rapper and record producer
- Helen Maroulis, Olympic wrestler
- Rachel Parsons, figure skater, 2017 junior national champion
- Haley Skarupa, professional ice hockey player
- Josh Tillman ("Father John Misty"), musician
- James Wood, professional baseball player
- Frederick Yeh, biologist and animal welfare activist
- Kuru, rapper, record producer, and model

== Sister cities ==
Rockville has two sister cities:

- Pinneberg, Schleswig-Holstein, Germany
- Yilan City, Yilan County, Taiwan

Rockville's sister city relationship with Yilan City gained notoriety as diplomats from the Embassy of China, Washington, D.C., unsuccessfully attempted to scuttle the agreement.

Although not a sister city, Rockville also has friendly relations with another city:

- Jiaxing, Zhejiang Province, China

== See also ==
- List of famous people from the Washington, D.C., metropolitan area
- Soul In Motion Players
- Tower Oaks – a planned community in Rockville
