= List of judges of the Supreme Court of Maryland =

The following are chronological lists of judges and chief judges of the Supreme Court of Maryland, known before December 14, 2022 as the Maryland Court of Appeals.

== List of chief judges ==
Name	Term start	Term end
Benjamin Rumsey	1778	1806
Jeremiah Chase	1806	1824
John Buchanan	1824	1844
Stevenson Archer	1844	1848
Thomas Beale Dorsey	1848	1851
John Carroll LeGrand	1851	1861
Richard Bowie	1861	1867
James Lawrence Bartol	1867	1883
Richard H. Alvey	1883	1893
John Mitchell Robinson	1893	1896
James McSherry	1896	1907
Andrew Hunter Boyd	1907	1924
Carroll Bond	1924	1943
D. Lindley Sloan	1943	1944
Ogle Marbury	1944	1952
Charles Markell	1952	1952
Simon Sobeloff	1952	1954
Frederick Brune	1954	1964
William L. Henderson	1964	1964
Stedman Prescott	1964	1966
Hall Hammond	1966	1972
Robert C. Murphy	1972	1996
Robert M. Bell	1996	2013
Mary Ellen Barbera	2013	2021
Joseph M. Getty	2021	2022
Matthew J. Fader	2022	present

== List of all judges ==
- Benjamin Rumsey, 1778–1806
- Benjamin Mackall IV 1778–1806
- Thomas Jones, 1778–1806
- Solomon Wright, 1778–1792
- James Murray, 1778–1784
- Richard Potts, 1801–1806
- Littleton Dennis Jr., 1801–1806
- John Thomson Mason, 1806–1806
- Jeremiah Chase, 1806–1824
- James Tilghman, 1806–1809
- William Polk, 1806–1812
- Richard Sprigg Jr., 1806
- Joseph Hopper Nicholson, 1806–1817
- John Mackall Gantt, 1806–1811
- John Buchanan, 1806–1844
- Richard Tilghman Earle, 1809–1834
- John Johnson Sr., 1811–1821
- John Done, 1812–1814
- William Bond Martin, 1814–1835
- Walter Dorsey, 1817–1823
- John Stephen, 1822–1844
- Stevenson Archer, 1823–1848
- Thomas Beale Dorsey, 1824–1851
- Ezekiel F. Chambers, 1834–1851
- Ara Spence, 1835–1851
- William B. Stone, 1844–1845
- Samuel Middleton Semmes, 1844–1845
- Alexander Contee Magruder, 1844–1851
- Robert N. Martin, 1845–1851
- William Frick, 1848–1851
- John Carroll LeGrand, 1851–1861
- John Bowers Eccleston, 1851–1860
- William Hallam Tuck, 1851–1861
- James Lawrence Bartol, 1857–1883
- Brice Goldsborough, 1860–1867
- Silas Morris Cochran, 1861–1866
- Richard Bowie, 1861–1867; 1871–1881
- Daniel Weisel, 1864–1867
- Peter Wood Crain, 1867
- James Augustus Stewart, 1867–1879
- Richard H. Alvey, 1867–1893
- Richard Grason, 1867–1882
- John Mitchell Robinson, 1867–1896
- Oliver Miller, 1867–1892
- Madison Nelson, 1867–1870
- George Brent, 1867–1881
- William P. Maulsby, 1870–1871
- Richard Bowie, 1871–1881
- Levin Thomas Handy Irving, 1879–1892
- John Ritchie, 1881–1887
- Daniel Randall Magruder, 1881
- Frederick Stone, 1881–1890
- George Yellott, 1882–1889
- William Shepard Bryan, 1883–1898
- James McSherry, 1887–1907
- David Fowler, 1889–1905
- John Parran Briscoe, 1890–1923
- Henry Page, 1892–1908
- Charles Boyle Roberts, 1892–1899
- Andrew Hunter Boyd, 1893–1924
- George Mitchell Russum, 1896–1897
- James Alfred Pearce, 1897–1912
- Samuel D. Schmucker, 1898–1911
- James A. C. Bond, 1899
- Isaac Thomas Jones, 1899–1907
- Nicholas Charles Burke, 1905–1920
- John G. Rogers, 1907
- Winder Laird Henry, 1908–1909
- William H. Thomas, 1907–1924
- Glenn H. Worthington, 1908–1909
- John R. Pattison, 1909–1934
- Hammond Urner, 1909–1938
- Henry Stockbridge Jr. 1911–1924
- Albert Constable, 1912–1919
- William H. Adkins, 1919–1934
- T. Scott Offutt, 1920–1942
- W. Mitchell Digges, 1923–1934
- Carroll T. Bond, 1924–1943
- Francis Neal Parke, 1924–1941
- William C. Walsh, 1924–1926
- D. Lindley Sloan, 1926–1944
- Benjamin A. Johnson, 1934–1943
- William Mason Shehan, 1934–1940
- Walter J. Mitchell, 1934–1941
- Edward S. Delaplaine, 1938–1956
- Stephen R. Collins, 1940–1957
- William H. Forsythe, 1941–1942
- Ogle Marbury, 1941–1952
- Ridgely P. Melvin, 1942–1945
- C. Gus Grason, 1942–1951
- Levin C. Bailey, 1943–1944
- Rowland K. Adams, 1943–1944
- Walter C. Capper, 1944
- William L. Henderson, 1944–1964
- Charles Markell, 1945–1952
- Hall Hammond, 1952–1972
- Simon E. Sobeloff, 1952–1954
- Frederick W. Brune, 1954–1964
- Stedman Prescott, 1956–1966
- William R. Horney, 1957–1968
- Charles C. Marbury, 1960–1969
- C. Ferdinand Sybert, 1961–1965
- Reuben Oppenheimer, 1964–1967
- Wilson K. Barnes, 1964–1974
- William J. McWilliams, 1965–1974
- Thomas B. Finan, 1966–1972
- Frederick J. Singley Jr. 1967–1977
- Marvin H. Smith, 1968–1986
- J. Dudley Digges, 1969–1982
- Robert C. Murphy, 2nd Appellate Circuit, 1972–1996
- Irving A. Levine, 1972–1978
- John C. Eldridge, 5th Appellate Circuit, 1974–2003
- William J. O'Donnell, 1974–1976
- Charles E. Orth Jr., 1976–1980
- Harry A. Cole, 1977–1991
- Rita C. Davidson, 1979–1984
- Lawrence F. Rodowsky, 3rd Appellate Circuit, 1980–2002
- James F. Couch Jr., 1982–1987
- John F. McAuliffe, 1985–1993
- William H. Adkins II, 1986–1990
- Albert T. Blackwell Jr., 1987–1990
- Howard S. Chasanow, 4th Appellate Circuit, 1990–1999
- Robert L. Karwacki, 1st Appellate Circuit, 1990–1998
- Robert M. Bell, 6th Appellate Circuit, 1991–2013
- Irma S. Raker, 7th Appellate Circuit, 1993–2008
- Alan M. Wilner, 2nd Appellate Circuit, 1996–2007
- Dale R. Cathell, 1st Appellate Circuit, 1998–2008
- Glenn T. Harrell Jr., 4th Appellate Circuit, 1999–2015
- Lynne A. Battaglia, 3rd Appellate Circuit, 2002–2016
- Clayton Greene Jr., 5th Appellate Circuit, 2004–2019
- Joseph F. Murphy Jr., 2nd Appellate Circuit, 2007–2011
- Sally D. Adkins, 1st Appellate Circuit, 2008–2018
- Mary Ellen Barbera, 7th Appellate Circuit, 2008–2021
- Robert N. McDonald, 2nd Appellate Circuit, 2011–2022
- Shirley M. Watts, 6th Appellate Circuit, 2013–
- Michele D. Hotten, 4th Appellate Circuit, 2015–2024
- Joseph M. Getty, 3rd Appellate Circuit, 2016–2022
- Brynja McDivitt Booth, 1st Appellate Circuit, 2019–
- Jonathan Biran, 5th Appellate Circuit, 2019–
- Steven B. Gould, 7th Appellate Circuit, 2021–
- Angela M. Eaves, 2nd Appellate Circuit, 2022–
- Matthew J. Fader, 3rd Appellate Circuit, 2022–
- Peter Killough, 4th Appellate Circuit, 2024–
