= Hebron (disambiguation) =

Hebron is a city in the West Bank, Palestinian territories.

Hebron may also refer to:

== Places ==
- Hebron (titular see), a medieval Catholic episcopal see in Hebron

=== Canada ===
- Hebron, Newfoundland and Labrador
- Hebron, New Brunswick
- Hebron, Nova Scotia
- Hebron, Prince Edward Island
- Hebron-Ben Nevis oil field

=== Ghana ===
- Hebron, Ghana, town in Eastern Province

=== Palestine ===
- Hebron Governorate, governorate in Palestine

=== Spain ===
- Vall d'Hebron, neighbourhood in Barcelona

=== United Kingdom ===
- Hebron, Anglesey, Wales
- Hebron, Carmarthenshire, Wales
- Hebburn, Tyne and Wear, England, historically known as Hebron.
- Hebron, Northumberland, England
- Hebron railway station on the Snowdon Mountain Railway, Gwynedd, Wales

=== United States ===
- Hebron, Connecticut
- Hebron, Illinois
- Hebron, Indiana
- Hebron, Iowa
- Hebron, Kentucky
- Hebron, Maine
- Hebron, Maryland
- Hebron (Still Pond, Maryland), listed on the NRHP
- Hebron, Missouri, in Douglas County
- Hebron, Shelby County, Missouri
- Hebron (Bethel, Missouri), listed on the NRHP
- Hebron, Nebraska
- Hebron, New Hampshire
- Hebron, New York
- Hebron, North Dakota
- Hebron, Ohio
- Hebron, Pennsylvania, in Lebanon County
- Hebron, Potter County, Pennsylvania
- Hebron, Texas
- Hebron, Utah, a ghost town
- Hebron, Marion County, West Virginia
- Hebron, Pleasants County, West Virginia
- Hebron, Wisconsin, a town
  - Hebron (CDP), Wisconsin, a census-designated place within the town
- Hebron Christian Academy

== Other ==
- Hebron (biblical figure), son of Kohath

== See also ==
- Hebron Yeshiva
- Hebron Academy in Hebron, Maine
- Hebron Academy (Brandon, Mississippi), listed on the NRHP in Mississippi
- Hebron Church (disambiguation)
- Hebron High School (disambiguation)
- Hebron Township (disambiguation)
- Mount Hebron (disambiguation)
