= Marbury =

Marbury may refer to:

== Places ==
- Marbury, Cheshire, United Kingdom
- Marbury, Alabama, United States
- Marbury, Maryland, United States

== Other ==
- Marbury (surname)
- Justice Marbury (disambiguation)
- Marbury Hall (disambiguation)
- Marbury School (disambiguation)
