= Mount Hebron (disambiguation) =

Mount Hebron is a geographic region and geologic formation in the West Bank.

Mount Hebron may also refer to:

- Mount Hebron, Alabama, United States
- Mt Hebron (Ellicott City), a historic house in Ellicott City, Maryland, United States
- Mount Hebron, California, United States
- Mount Hebron, New Brunswick, Canada
- Mount Hebron Cemetery (disambiguation)
- Mount Hebron High School in Ellicott City, Maryland, United States

== See also ==
- Hebron (disambiguation)
