= Rowland K. Adams =

American judge (1889–1944)

Judge of the Maryland Court of Appeals
- In office 1943–1944
- Preceded by: D. Lindley Sloan
- Succeeded by: William L. Henderson

Personal details
- Born: July 10, 1889 Waynesboro, Pennsylvania, U.S.
- Died: July 30, 1944 (aged 55)
- Education: St. John's College; University of Maryland School of Law
- Profession: Judge

Military service
- Allegiance: United States
- Branch/service: United States Army
- Battles/wars: World War I

Rowland K. Adams (July 10, 1889 – July 30, 1944) was a justice of the Maryland Court of Appeals, the highest court in the state of Maryland, from 1943 to 1944.

Born in Waynesboro, Pennsylvania, Adams moved with his family to Boonsboro, Maryland in 1895, where he attended Hagerstown High School. Adams graduated from St. John's College in Annapolis in 1911, and from the University of Maryland School of Law in 1914.

Adams served stateside as a captain of infantry in the First World War, and was later a deputy state's attorney and a member of the Baltimore city supreme bench. During World War II, on March 26, 1942, Adams was appointed director of the Third Civilian Defense Region. On January 27, 1943, Governor Herbert O'Conor appointed Adams to a vacancy on the Maryland Court of Appeals caused by the death of Chief Judge Carroll T. Bond, and subsequent elevation of Judge D. Lindley Sloan to the position of Chief Judge.

Political offices
Preceded by D. Lindley Sloan	Judge of the Maryland Court of Appeals; 1943–1944	Succeeded by William L. Henderson
