= William Adkins =

William Adkins may refer to:

- William Ryland Dent Adkins (1862–1925), English barrister, judge, and politician
- William H. Adkins II (1925–2003), American judge
