= Benjamin Alvin Johnson =

American jurist

Benjamin Alvin Johnson (December 23, 1887 – October 22, 1943) was an American jurist who served as Chief Judge of the First Judicial Circuit of Maryland and was a member of the Maryland Court of Appeals.

Born in Wango, Wicomico County, Maryland, Johnson graduated from Washington College in 1911 and the Baltimore Law School in 1912. He was admitted to the Maryland Bar in 1913 and established a law practice in Salisbury, forming the firm of Long & Johnson. His early career included serving as the City Solicitor of Salisbury from 1914 to 1920.

In 1934, Johnson was elected Chief Judge of the First Judicial Circuit, a position that also made him a member of the Maryland Court of Appeals. He held this office until 1943 when, following a prolonged illness, the Maryland Legislature retired him. He was succeeded by Levin Claude Bailey.

Johnson died at his home in Salisbury at the age of 55. He was married to Ethel Holloway and they had four children.
