= Merbury =

Merbury is a surname. Notable people with the surname include:

- Laurence Merbury (fl. 1412–1421; d. 1423–1437), English-born Irish statesman
- Nicholas Merbury (d. 1421), English administrator and MP

== See also ==
- Marbury (surname)
