= Chasanow =

Chasanow is a surname. Notable people with the surname include:

- Abraham Chasanow (1910–1989), U.S. Navy employee, subject of security investigation
- Deborah K. Chasanow (born 1948), United States federal judge
- Howard S. Chasanow (1937–2017), justice of the Maryland Court of Appeals
