= 1950 Maryland Attorney General election =

- November 7, 1950

Nominee	Hall Hammond	William A. Gunter
Party	Democratic	Republican
Popular vote	298,797	253,080
Percentage	54.14%	45.86%
- County results Hammond: 50–60% 60–70% Gunter: 50–60% 70–80%
Attorney General before election
Hall Hammond
Democratic
Elected Attorney General
Hall Hammond
Democratic

The 1950 Maryland attorney general election was held on November 7, 1950, in order to elect the attorney general of Maryland. Democratic nominee and incumbent attorney general Hall Hammond defeated Republican nominee William A. Gunter.

== General election ==
On election day, November 7, 1950, Democratic nominee Hall Hammond won re-election by a margin of 45,717 votes against his opponent Republican nominee William A. Gunter, thereby retaining Democratic control over the office of attorney general. Hammond was sworn in for his second term on January 3, 1951.

=== Results ===
Maryland Attorney General election, 1950
Party	Candidate	Votes	%
Democratic	Hall Hammond (incumbent)	298,797	54.14
Republican	William A. Gunter	253,080	45.86
Total votes		551,877	100.00
Democratic hold			
