= Robert L. Karwacki =

American judge (1933–2014)

Personal details
- Born: August 2, 1933 Baltimore, Maryland, U.S.
- Died: June 9, 2014 (aged 80) Chester, Maryland, U.S.
- Spouse: Marion Elizabeth Harper Karwacki
- Children: Ann Karwacki Goodman, L. Daniel Karwacki, John Robert Karwacki
- Education: University of Maryland
- Occupation: Judge
- Awards: A Man for All Seasons Award, St. Thomas More Society of Maryland

Robert L. Karwacki (August 2, 1933 – June 9, 2014) was a justice of the Maryland Court of Appeals from 1990 to 1998.

== Early life and education ==
Karwacki was born in Baltimore, Maryland. He earned his law degree and began his legal career in the state.

== Career ==
Karwacki practiced law with Miles & Stockbridge. Before serving as a judge on the Baltimore bench for 11 years, In 1984, he was appointed to the Maryland Court of Special Appeals, the state's intermediate appellate court.

=== Appointment to the Maryland Court of Appeals ===
In November 1990, Governor William Donald Schaefer appointed Karwacki to the Maryland Court of Appeals, filling a vacancy created by the retirement of Judge William H. Adkins II. Karwacki's appointment followed a nomination process by the state's 13-member appellate nominating commission. His selection was seen as a pragmatic choice, with legal professionals noting his strong work ethic and focus on procedural efficiency.

== Death ==
Karwacki died on June 9, 2014, at his home in Chester, Maryland, due to kidney failure.

Political offices
Preceded by William H. Adkins II	Judge of the Maryland Court of Appeals; 1990–1998	Succeeded by Dale R. Cathell
