= Justice Bailey =

Justice Bailey may refer to:

- John O. Bailey (1880–1959), chief justice of the Oregon Supreme Court
- Joseph M. Bailey (1833–1895), chief justice of the Illinois Supreme Court
- Lawrence Dudley Bailey (1819–1891), associate justice of the Kansas Supreme Court
- Levin C. Bailey (c. 1892–1952), judge of the Maryland Court of Appeals

== See also ==
- Judge Bailey (disambiguation)
