= 1946 Maryland Attorney General election =

- November 5, 1946

Nominee	Hall Hammond	George Cochran Doub
Party	Democratic	Republican
Popular vote	245,782	195,273
Percentage	55.73%	44.27%
- County results Hammond: 50–60% 60–70% Doub: 50–60% 60–70%
Attorney General before election
William Curran (Acting)
Democratic
Elected Attorney General
Hall Hammond
Democratic

The 1946 Maryland attorney general election was held on November 5, 1946, in order to elect the attorney general of Maryland. Democratic nominee Hall Hammond defeated Republican nominee George Cochran Doub.

== General election ==
On election day, November 5, 1946, Democratic nominee Hall Hammond won the election by a margin of 50,509 votes against his opponent Republican nominee George Cochran Doub, thereby retaining Democratic control over the office of attorney general. Hammond was sworn in as the 35th attorney general of Maryland on January 3, 1947.

=== Results ===
Maryland Attorney General election, 1946
Party	Candidate	Votes	%
Democratic	Hall Hammond	245,782	55.73
Republican	George Cochran Doub	195,273	44.27
Total votes		441,055	100.00
Democratic hold			
