= Justice Couch =

Justice Couch may refer to:

- James F. Couch Jr. (c. 1918–1990), associate justice of the Maryland Court of Appeals
- Jessup Nash Couch (1778–1821), associate justice of the Ohio Supreme Court
