= Justice Blackwell =

Justice Blackwell may refer to:

- Albert T. Blackwell Jr. (1925–2022), associate justice of the Maryland Court of Appeals
- Keith R. Blackwell (born 1975), associate justice of the Supreme Court of Georgia
