= John Parran Briscoe =

American judge (1853–1925)

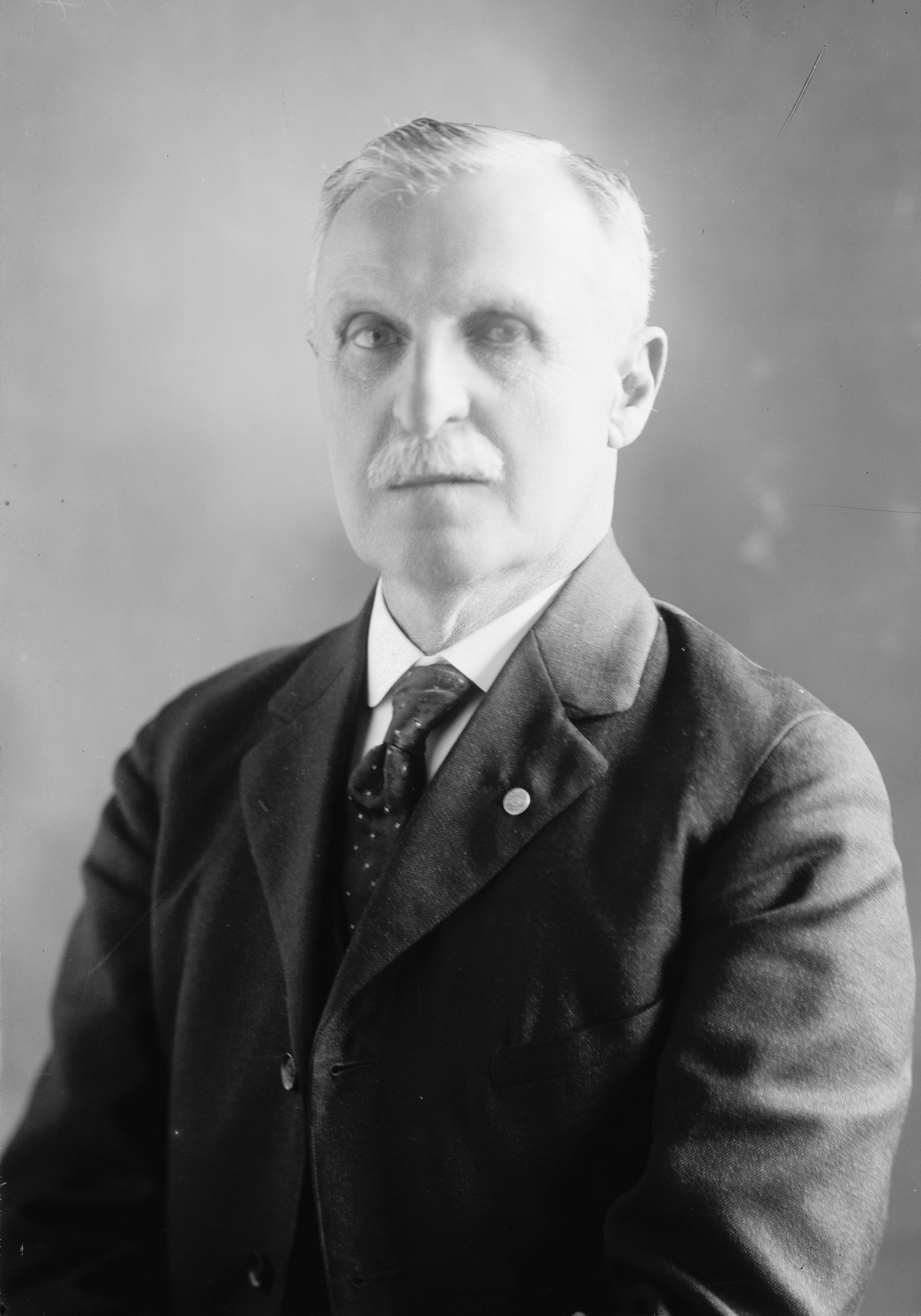
- Briscoe, 1922

Judge of the Maryland Court of Appeals
- In office 1890–1923
- Preceded by: Frederick Stone
- Succeeded by: Walter M. Digges

Personal details
- Born: August 24, 1853; Calvert County, Maryland, U.S.
- Died: April 14, 1925 (aged 71); Baltimore, Maryland, U.S.
- Spouse: Kate MacPherson Bowen (m. 1879)
- Children: 7
- Education: St. John's College
- Occupation: Judge

John Parran Briscoe (August 24, 1853 – April 14, 1925) was a justice of the Maryland Court of Appeals from 1891 to 1924.

== Early life ==
John Parran Briscoe was born on August 24, 1853, in Calvert County, Maryland to Anna Maria (née Parran) and James Thompson Briscoe. His father was the Secretary of State of Maryland. He attended Charlotte Hall Military Academy in St. Mary's County and St. John's College in Annapolis, Maryland. He was admitted to the bar in 1875.

== Career ==
Briscoe privately practiced law from 1875 to 1890. After 1924, he practiced law under Briscoe & Jones, Baltimore.

Briscoe was elected as state's attorney of Calvert County in 1879, 1883, and 1887. He served as judge of the Maryland Court of Appeals from 1891 to 1924. His term expired on November 5, 1922 and was ineligible for reelection. He was reappointed until his successor, Walter M. Digges qualified. He also served as chief judge of the Seventh Judicial District of Maryland (Calvert, Charles, St. Mary's and Prince George's counties) from 1891 to 1924.

He served as a member of the board of visitors in St. John's from 1890 to 1924. He was president of the Maryland State Bar Association in 1905. He served as chair of the Institute of Criminal Law and Criminology.

== Personal life ==
Briscoe married Kate MacPherson Bowen on November 26, 1879. They had seven children: John P. Briscoe Jr., Anne Etheldre, Catherine MacPherson, Lucy Lee, William Norwood, Philander Bowen and Laurence Morton. He lived in Lower Marlboro, Maryland and later moved to Prince Frederick. His brother was James T. Briscoe, publisher of the Daily Mail of Hagerstown.

Briscoe died on April 14, 1925, in Baltimore.

Political offices
Preceded by Frederick Stone	Judge of the Maryland Court of Appeals; 1890–1923	Succeeded by Walter M. Digges
