= Wilson K. Barnes =

American judge (1907–1997)

Wilson K. Barnes (1907 – August 19, 1997) was a justice of the Maryland Court of Appeals from 1964 to 1974.

== Biography ==
Born in Pocomoke City, Maryland in Worcester County, he attended local public schools, received B.A. from Western Maryland College in 1928, and studied law at Harvard University and the University of Maryland. He received an LL.B. from the University of Maryland in 1931.

Barnes began his legal career as a clerk for Judge William Calvin Chesnut. He entered private practice in 1933. He served as Assistant Baltimore City Solicitor in 1940. He was Deputy City Solicitor from 1942 to 1943. He was a partner at Anderson, Barnes, Coe & King from 1943 to 1963 and a member of the State Board of Law Examiners from 1943 to 1963.

Barnes served on Supreme Bench of Baltimore City in 1963. He was appointed to the Maryland Court of Appeals in 1964, to a seat vacated by the retirement of William L. Henderson. He resigned in protest of the appointment of Governor Mandel's close aide to the Court of Appeals in 1974. He was defeated in the Democratic Party primary election for governor by Mandel in 1974 and returned to private practice with Little, Hall & Steinman.

== Personal life and death ==
In 1938, Barnes married Elizabeth Chesnut, the daughter of Judge Chesnut. They had two children, William C. C. Barnes and Wilson K. Barnes Jr. She died in 1982.

Barnes retired in 1982, and died August 19, 1997.

Political offices
Preceded by William L. Henderson	Judge of the Maryland Court of Appeals; 1964–1974	Succeeded by William J. O'Donnell
