= John C. Eldridge =

American judge (1933–2018)

John Cole Eldridge (November 13, 1933 – July 27, 2018) was a justice of the Maryland Court of Appeals from 1974 to 2003.

He was born in Baltimore, Maryland attending Baltimore County Public Schools, graduating from Gilman School. He then graduated from Harvard College in 1955 and the University of Maryland Francis King Carey School of Law in 1959. He clerked for Judge Simon Sobeloff of the United States Court of Appeals for the Fourth Circuit from 1959 to 1961. Starting in 1961, he was an attorney for the United States Department of Justice. In 1969, he was appointed chief legislative officer for Governor Marvin Mandel. In 1974, he appointed to the state Court of Appeals by Mandel.

He died in 2018 in Annapolis, Maryland.

Political offices
Preceded by William J. McWilliams	Judge of the Maryland Court of Appeals; 1974–2003	Succeeded by Clayton Greene Jr.
