= Reuben Oppenheimer =

American judge (1897–1982)

Reuben Oppenheimer (October 24, 1897 – July 10, 1982) was an American attorney who served as a justice of the Maryland Court of Appeals from 1964 to 1967.

== Early life, education, and career ==
Born in Baltimore, Maryland, Oppenheimer attended the public schools of that city, and Baltimore City College, from which he graduated in 1914. He received a degree from the Johns Hopkins University in 1917, and served in the United States Navy during World War I. He received a J.D. from Harvard Law School in 1921, where he was elected as an editor on the Harvard Law Review.

He entered the practice of law and was active in public affairs, serving on various city and state oversight committees, as well as sitting on the boards of various Jewish community organizations, such as the American Jewish Committee. In 1937, he was selected to chair committee of the Bar Association of Baltimore to investigate the People's Court of Baltimore. From 1943 to 1945, during World War II, he was a member and co-chairman of the Appeals and Review Committees of the National War Labor Board. From 1947 to 1955, he was also an instructor at the University of Maryland Law School.

== Judicial service and later life ==
In 1955, Governor Theodore McKeldin appointed Oppenheimer to the Supreme Bench of Baltimore City, to which he was elected to a full fifteen year term the following year. Nine years into this term, however, on August 31, 1964, he was named on a list of eight judges recommended by the Maryland State Bar Association as candidates for elevation to a seat on the state supreme court vacated by the retirement of Chief Judge Frederick Brune. The following day, Oppenheimer was selected by Governor J. Millard Tawes for the appointment.

At the time of his appointment to the state supreme court, Oppenheimer was described as "an exponent of court reform". Appointed at the age of 67, it was known at the time that he would reach the mandatory retirement age in three years. Following his retirement, he "wrote numerous articles on legal subjects" and "was the author of many articles in law reviews and of monographs on juvenile and family courts for the U.S. Children's Bureau".

== Personal life and death ==
In 1922, Oppenheimer married Selma C. Levy, with whom he had a daughter and a son.

He died at his home at the age of 84, following a short illness.

Political offices
Preceded by Frederick Brune	Judge of the Maryland Court of Appeals; 1964–1967	Succeeded by Frederick J. Singley Jr.
