= Justice Frick =

Justice Frick may refer to:

- Joseph E. Frick (1848–1927), associate justice of the Utah Supreme Court
- William Frick (judge) (1790–1855), associate justice of the Maryland Court of Appeals
