= William H. Thomas (Maryland judge) =

American judge (1861–1924)

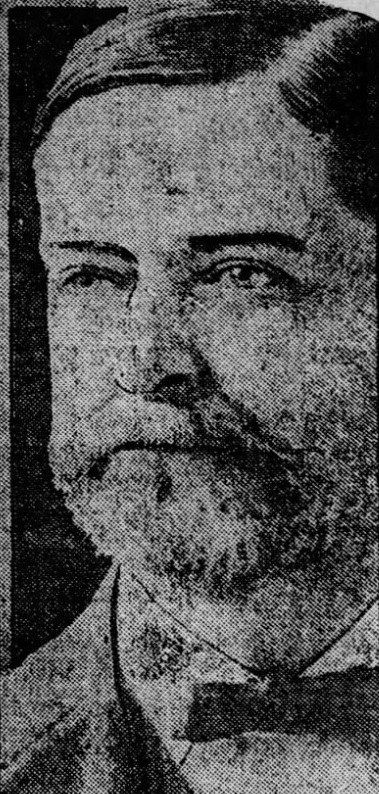
Justice William H. Thomas of Maryland

William H. Thomas (c. 1861 – April 26, 1924) was a justice of the Maryland Court of Appeals from 1907 to 1924.

In December 1907, Governor Edwin Warfield appointed Thomas to a seat on the state supreme court vacated by John G. Rogers.

Thomas married Katherine Roberts, with whom he had three daughters and one son who survived him.

Thomas died suddenly at his office in the Carroll County Courthouse, in Westminster, Maryland.

Political offices
Preceded by John G. Rogers	Judge of the Maryland Court of Appeals; 1907–1924	Succeeded by Francis Neal Parke
