= Justice Marbury =

Justice Marbury may refer to:

- Charles Clagett Marbury (1898–1991), judge of the Maryland Court of Appeals
- Ogle Marbury (1882–1973), chief judge of the Maryland Court of Appeals
