= George Brent (judge) =

American judge (1817–1881)

George Brent Jr. (September 28, 1817 – January 6, 1881) was a justice of the Maryland Court of Appeals from 1867 to 1881.

Born in Charles County, Maryland, to George and Matilda (Thomas) Brent, his father's ancestors (including lawyer/nun Margaret Brent) had owned land in that area of Maryland since about 1640.

Brent represented Charles County several times in the state legislature, and was a member of the state constitutional convention in 1850. He was "recognized as a lawyer of distinguished ability", and, as a judge, "presided over his court with much ease and decorum, his decisions showing great research and legal knowledge and acumen". Following a restructuting of the court in 1867, Brent was elected chief judge of the seventh circuit, and therefore a member of the court of appeals, without opposition. Brent served until his death of heart disease at his home in Charles County, following a lengthy illness, at the age of 63.

Brent was married to his cousin, Catherine Merrick, with whom he had eleven children.

Political offices
Preceded by Newly reconfigured court	Judge of the Maryland Court of Appeals; 1867–1881	Succeeded by Daniel Randall Magruder
