= John Buchanan (Maryland judge) =

American judge (1722–1844)

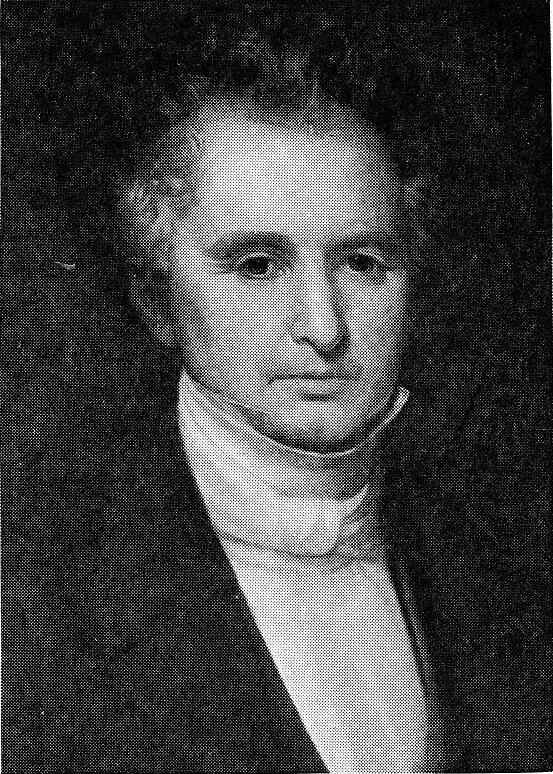

Chief Judge of the Maryland Court of Appeals
- In office 1824–1844
- Preceded by: Jeremiah Chase
- Succeeded by: Stevenson Archer

Justice of the Maryland Court of Appeals
- In office 1806–1824

Member of the Maryland House of Delegates
- In office 1797–1799

Personal details
- Born: 1772 Prince George's County, Maryland, British America
- Died: November 6, 1844 (aged 71–72) Williamsport, Maryland, U.S.
- Spouse: Sophia Williams
- Children: 1

John Buchanan (1772–November 6, 1844) was a Maryland politician and long-serving Justice of the Maryland Court of Appeals, sitting on the court from 1806 to 1844, and serving as chief justice from 1824 to 1844.

== Biography ==
John Buchanan was born in 1772, in Prince George's County, Maryland to Thomas Buchanan and Mary Cook or Anne Cooke Buchanan. He attended Charlotte Hall School in St. Mary's County, Maryland. He read law under Judge Robert White in Winchester, Virginia and John Thomson Mason in Hagerstown, Maryland.

Buchanan served in the Maryland House of Delegates for Washington County, Maryland from 1797 to 1799. In 1806, he began 38 years of simultaneous service as both Chief Judge of the Washington County Circuit Court, 5th Judicial Circuit, and justice of the Maryland Court of Appeals. On the latter court, he was an associate justice from 1806 to 1824, and Chief Judge from 1824 until his death in 1844. He was also a Presidential Elector in 1817, and director of the Hagerstown Bank from 1820 to 1825.

He married Sophia Williams, with whom he has one son, Thomas Eli Buchanan. He resided at an estate named "Woodland", near Williamsport, Maryland, and died there on November 6, 1844.

Legal offices
Preceded by Jeremiah Chase	Chief Judge of the Maryland Court of Appeals; 1824–1844	Succeeded by Stevenson Archer
