= Michele D. Hotten =

American judge (born 1954)

Michele Hotten
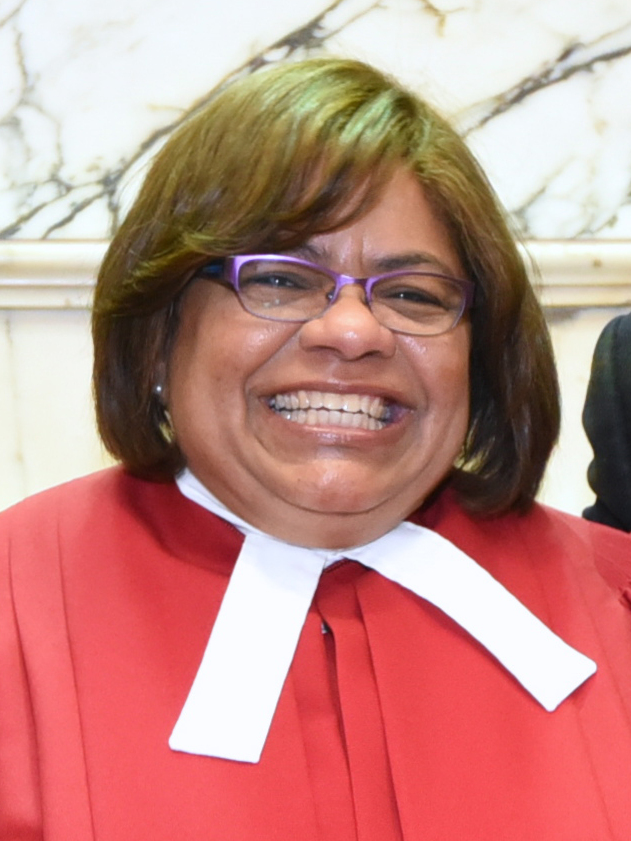

Justice of the Supreme Court of Maryland
- In office December 22, 2015 – April 20, 2024
- Appointed by: Larry Hogan
- Preceded by: Glenn T. Harrell Jr.
- Succeeded by: Peter Killough

Personal details
- Born: April 20, 1954 (age 71); Washington, D.C., U.S.
- Education: New College of Florida (BA); Howard University (JD)

Michele Denise Hotten (born April 20, 1954) is a senior justice of the Supreme Court of Maryland appointed by Governor Larry Hogan.

== Biography ==
The first in her immediate family to attend college, Hotten received her Bachelor of Arts from the University of South Florida in 1975 and her Juris Doctor from the Howard University School of Law in 1979.

Hotten served as a circuit court judge in Prince George's for 16 years and spent one year as a district court judge. She worked as an assistant state's attorney in Prince George's and served as deputy people's zoning counsel and as a hearing examiner for the county Board of Education. She also has worked in private practice.

She was previously a judge on the Maryland Court of Special Appeals. She was appointed to that court by Governor Martin O'Malley on July 23, 2010, to fill the vacancy left by James Salmon.

=== Maryland Court of Appeals service ===
On December 1, 2015, Governor Larry Hogan appointed Hotten to fill the vacancy left by the retirement of Judge Glenn T. Harrell Jr. She was sworn into office on December 22, 2015.

At the time of her appointment, she was the fifth woman on the seven-judge panel, which has the highest number of women the court has ever had. She also was the second African American woman appointed to the court, after Judge Shirley M. Watts, who was appointed prior to her.

Hotton became a senior justice in April 2024, after reaching the mandatory retirement age of 70.

== Personal life ==
Hotten grew up poor in Southeast Washington, raised by a single mother who often worked three jobs to make ends meet.

== See also ==
- List of African-American jurists

Legal offices
Preceded by Glenn T. Harrell Jr.	Justice of the Supreme Court of Maryland; 2015–2024	Succeeded by Peter Killough
