= Brynja M. Booth =

American judge (born 1972)

Brynja Booth
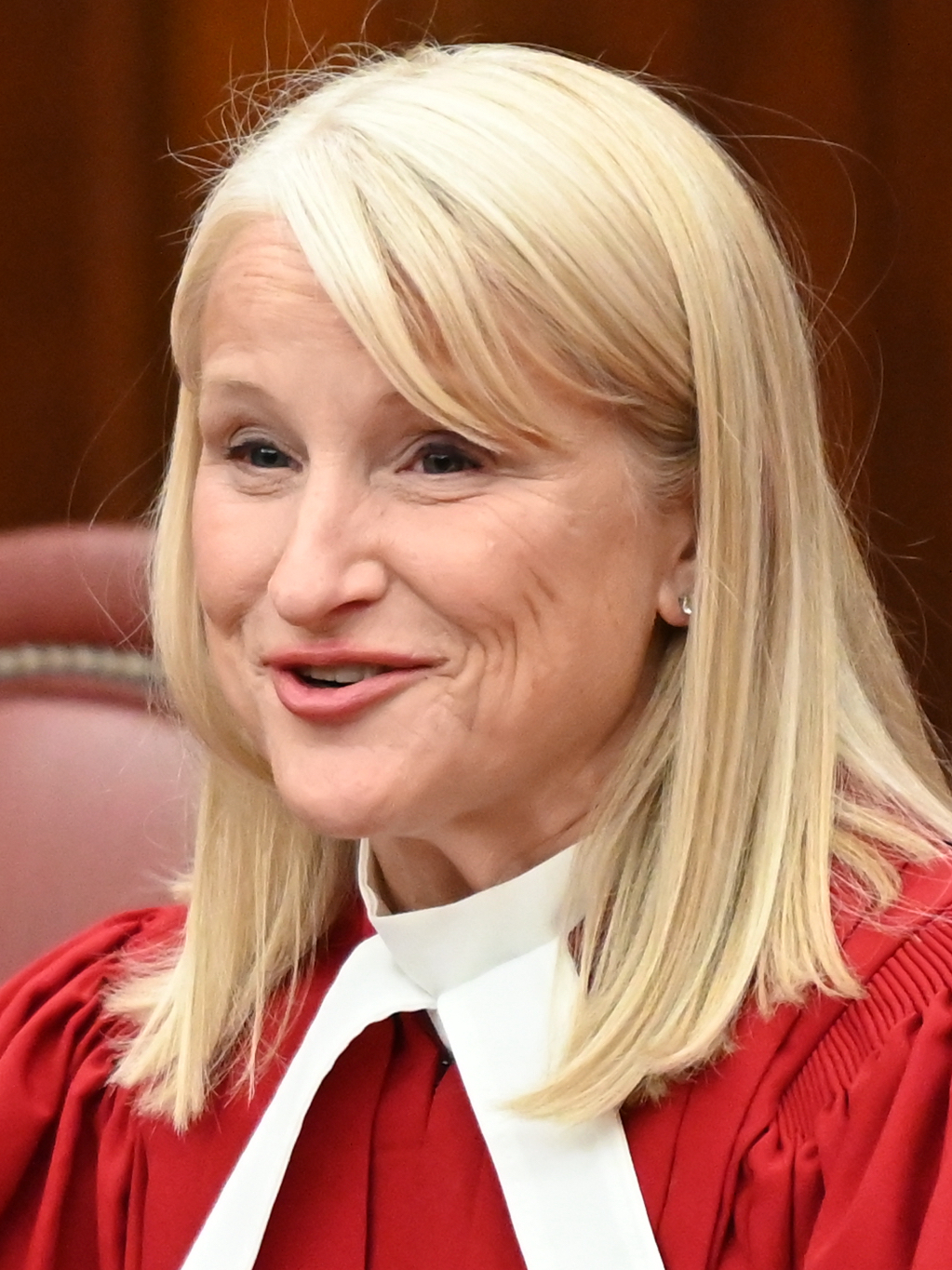

Justice of the Supreme Court of Maryland
- Incumbent
- Assumed office April 18, 2019
- Appointed by: Larry Hogan
- Preceded by: Sally D. Adkins

Personal details
- Born: Brynja McDivitt; 1972 (age 53–54) Olean, New York, U.S.
- Spouse: Curt Booth
- Children: 2
- Education: Bucknell University (BA); Washington and Lee University (JD)

Brynja McDivitt Booth (born 1972) is an American lawyer who has served as a justice of the Supreme Court of Maryland since 2019.

== Early life ==
Brynja McDivitt Booth was born in 1972 in Olean, New York. She graduated with a Bachelor of Arts in political science from Bucknell University, cum laude, in 1993. She graduated with a Juris Doctor from Washington and Lee University School of Law, cum laude, in 1996.

== Career ==
Upon graduating law school, she served as a law clerk for Judge William S. Horne of the Talbot County Circuit Court. From 1997 to 2000, Booth was an associate with Cowdrey, Thompson & Karsten, PA; she served as a shareholder from 2000 to 2003. From 2003 to 2008, she was with Cowdrey, Thompson & Karsten, PC and from 2003 to 2008 she was with Cowdrey Thompson, P.C. Before her appointment to the court, she was an attorney and shareholder of Booth, Booth, Cropper & Marriner, P.C. and has extensive appellate experience. Since 2016, she has served as the president of the Maryland Municipal Attorneys Association.

=== Supreme Court of Maryland ===
On March 12, 2019, Governor Larry Hogan announced his appointment of Booth to the Supreme Court of Maryland. On March 22, 2019, her appointment was confirmed by the Maryland Senate. She took her seat on April 18, 2019. She had a formal investiture on July 11, 2019.

== Personal life ==
The daughter of Boyce McDivitt and Kathryn Anderson McDivitt, she grew up in Olean, New York.

She and her husband Curt live with their two children in Easton, Maryland. She is active at The Country School and in St. Marks United Methodist Church in Easton.

Legal offices
Preceded by Sally D. Adkins	Justice of the Supreme Court of Maryland; 2019–present	Incumbent
