= Benjamin Rumsey =

American judge (1734–1808)

Chief Judge of the Maryland Court of Appeals
- In office 1778–1806
- Preceded by: Office established
- Succeeded by: Jeremiah Chase

Personal details
- Born: October 6, 1734; Cecil County, Maryland, U.S.
- Died: March 7, 1808 (aged 73); Joppa, Maryland, U.S.
- Resting place: Old St. John's Church Cemetery; Joppatowne, Maryland, U.S.
- Spouse: Mary Hall (m. 1768)
- Relations: James Rumsey (cousin)
- Children: 3
- Education: Princeton University
- Occupation: Judge

Benjamin Rumsey (October 6, 1734 – March 7, 1808) was an American jurist from Joppa, Maryland. He served as a delegate for Maryland in the Continental Congress in 1776 and 1777. He served for over twenty-five years, beginning in 1778 until his retirement in 1806 as the first chief judge of the Maryland Court of Appeals. His record of longevity still stands today.

== Early life ==
Benjamin Rumsey was born on October 6, 1734, to Sabina (née Blaidenburgh) and William Ramsey at Bohemia Manor in Cecil County Province of Maryland. After attending Princeton, he read law and was admitted to the bar. He settled in Joppa about 1768 and lived there the rest of his life.

== Career ==
Rumsey was first elected to Maryland's lower house in 1771 as a member for Cecil County. After Harford County was formed in 1773, he represented it. He also represented the county in the Maryland conventions held between 1775 and 1776. Maryland sent him as a delegate to the Continental Congress in 1776 and 1777. He was elected as colonel of the lower battalion of the Harford County Militia on January 6, 1776.

When a new state superior court (the Maryland Court of Appeals) was created in 1778, Benjamin Rumsey was appointed as its first chief justice. He held that post until his retirement in 1806.

== Personal life ==
Rumsey married Mary Hall on March 24, 1768. He had three children: Benjamin Jr., John and Hannah. His cousin was James Rumsey, engineer known for his early steamboat experiments.

Rumsey died at home in Joppa on March 7, 1808 and is buried in the Old St. John's Church Cemetery there.

== Legacy ==
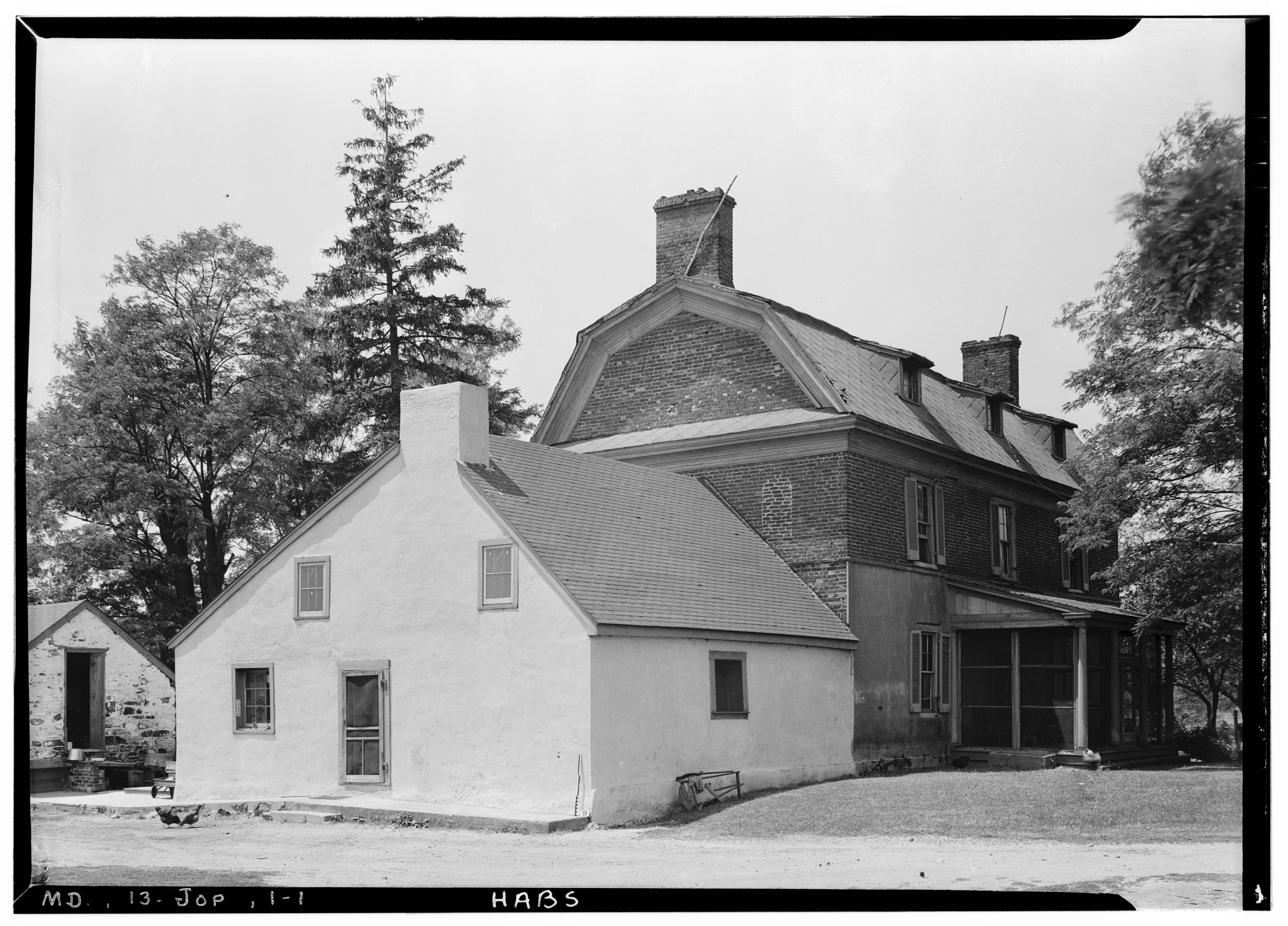
Benjamin Rumsey House in Joppatowne, Maryland, c. 1936

Rumsey Mansion, the home of Benjamin Rumsey, in Joppa, Maryland was included in the Historic American Buildings Survey. It is the only remaining building of Old Joppa, the first city of northern Maryland.

Legal offices
Preceded by no one	Chief Judge of the Maryland Court of Appeals; 1778–1806	Succeeded by Jeremiah Townly Chase
