= Hebron Christian Academy =

Baptist school in Dacula, Georgia, United States

Coordinates: 34.007°N 83.913°W

Location
- 775 Dacula Road; Dacula, Georgia; United States

Information
- Type: Private, Baptist
- Established: 1999
- Founder: Rev. Lance R. Sperring
- School district: Gwinnett County
- Headmaster: Dr. James Taylor
- Teaching staff: 85.6
- Grades: K-12
- Gender: coed
- Enrollment: 1,152
- Colors: Cardinal and gold
- Athletics: 52 (GHSA)
- Mascot: Judah the lion
- Rival: Providence Christian Academy
- Accreditation: ACSI, Cognia, GHSA, NP
- Newspaper: The Mirror
- Yearbook: The Pride
- Website: Hebron Christian Academy

Hebron Christian Academy (HCA) is a private, co-educational, Baptist school in Dacula, Georgia, United States founded in 1984 as the Northeast Atlanta Christian School.

== History ==
The Northeast Atlanta Christian School was founded by the Rev. Lance Sperring in 1984, which opened in 1985 serving 90 students in grades kindergarten through grade twelve.

In 1999, Hebron Baptist Church purchased Northeast Atlanta Christian School. The name was subsequently changed to Hebron Christian Academy. Classes are offered for pre-K through twelfth grade.

== Demographics ==
As of the 2021-2022 school year, the year most recently reported to the National Center for Education Statistics, the total enrollment in grades pre-K-12 was 1152. Of these, 856 or 74% were White, 150 or 13% were Black, 40 were of two or more races, 20 were Hispanic, and none were American Indian/ Alaska Native, and none were Native Hawaiian/ Pacific Islander.

== Athletics ==
The Hebron Lions compete in the Georgia High School Association as a AAA school. The sports teams use the nickname Lions, and the mascot is Judah the Lion. The girls' basketball team won the 2020-2021 GHSA Class A Private State Championship.
