= Hebron Church =

Hebron Church may refer to:

== United Kingdom ==
- Hebron Church, Long Ashton, North Somerset, England
- Hebron Chapel, Ton Pentre, Rhondda Cynon Taf, Wales

== United States ==
- Hebron Church, Cemetery, and Academy, Commerce, Georgia
- Hebron Baptist Church, Dacula, Georgia
- Hebron Presbyterian Church, Beautancus, North Carolina
- Hebron Methodist Church, Oakville, North Carolina
- Hebron Church (Bucksville, South Carolina)
- Hebron Lutheran Church, Madison, Virginia
- Hebron Church (Intermont, West Virginia)
