= John Stephen (Maryland judge) =

American judge (1780–1844)

Judge of the Maryland Court of Appeals
- In office 1822 – July 26, 1844

United States Attorney for the District of Maryland
- In office 1806–1810
- Appointed by: Thomas Jefferson
- Preceded by: Zebulon Hollingsworth
- Succeeded by: Thomas Beale Dorsey

Personal details
- Born: 1780 St. Mary's County, Maryland, United States of America
- Died: July 26, 1844 (aged 63–64) Annapolis, Maryland, United States of America

John Stephen (1780 – July 26, 1844) was a Maryland public official and judge who served as a justice of the Maryland Court of Appeals from 1822 to 1844.

== Biography ==
Born in St. Mary's County, Maryland to the Rev. John Stephen, minister of All Faith's Church, Stephen was elected to the Maryland House of Delegates for Baltimore City from 1804 to 1805. On March 17, 1806, President Thomas Jefferson nominated Stephen to serve as United States Attorney for the District of Maryland. Stephen resigned from that office in 1810, and thereafter served as a Member of Governors' Council from 1810 to 1811, and as a member of the Maryland Senate representing the Western Shore from 1812 to 1815. He lived in Annapolis from 1817 to 1818, and again served on the Governors' Council from 1819 to 1820, and in the Maryland Senate in 1821.

In 1822, Stephen was named to the Maryland Court of Appeals, where he remained until his death in 1844. He was described as a "learned and able jurist" who "obtained a high reputation as a judge".

== Personal life and death ==
Stephen married Juliana J. Brice, daughter of Colonel James Brice, on November 1, 1808. They resided at Stephen's estate, called "Bostwick", in Bladensburg, Prince George's County, and they had eight sons.

Stephen died in Annapolis, Maryland, at about age 64.

Legal offices
Preceded by John Johnson Sr.	Judge of the Maryland Court of Appeals; 1822–1844	Succeeded by Alexander Contee Magruder
Preceded by Zebulon Hollingsworth	United States Attorney for the District of Maryland; 1806–1810	Succeeded by Thomas Beale Dorsey
