= Thomas Beale Dorsey =

American judge

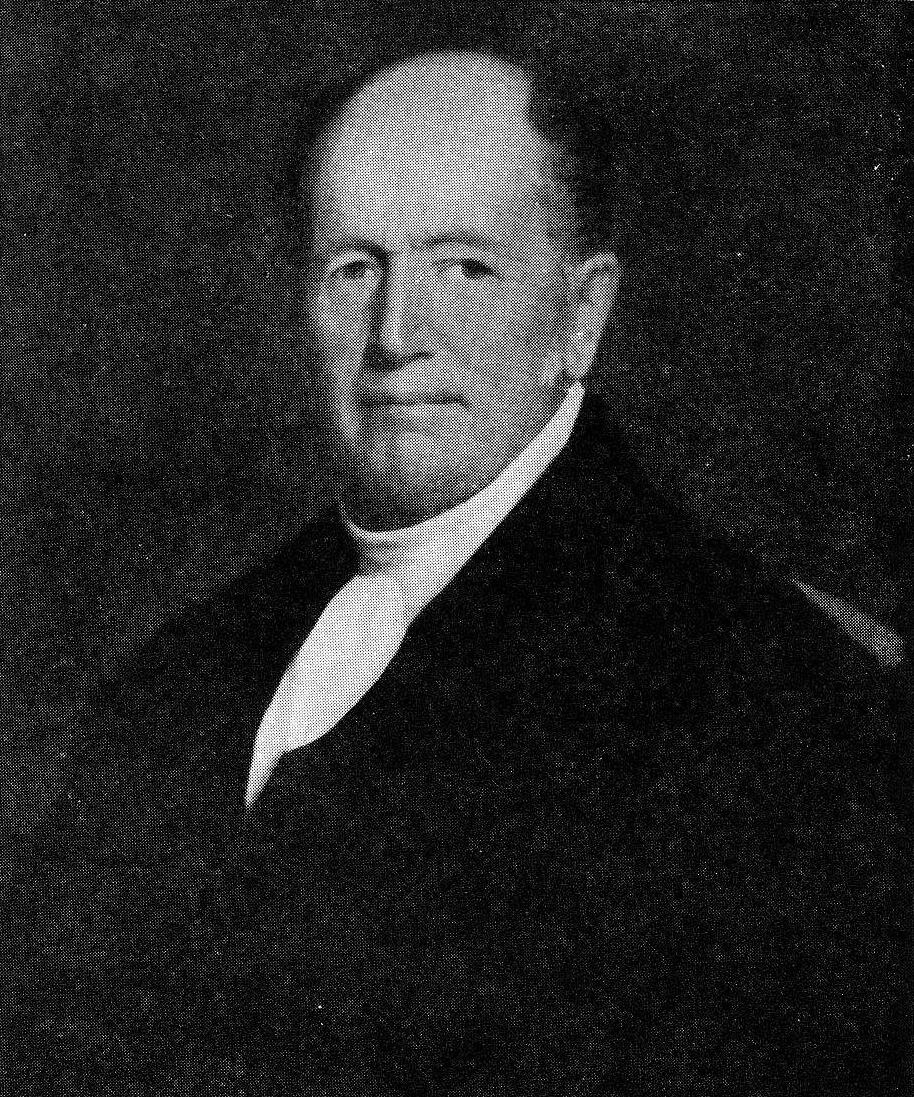

Chief Judge of the Maryland Court of Appeals
- In office 1848–1851
- Preceded by: Stevenson Archer
- Succeeded by: John Carroll LeGrand

Attorney General of Maryland
- In office 1822–1824

Member of the Maryland House of Delegates
- In office 1813

United States Attorney for the District of Maryland
- In office 1811–1812
- Appointed by: James Madison
- Preceded by: John Stephen
- Succeeded by: Elias Glenn

Personal details
- Born: October 17, 1780 Anne Arundel County, Maryland
- Died: December 26, 1855 (aged 75)
- Resting place: St. John's Churchyard; Ellicott City, Maryland, U.S.
- Party: Democratic-Republican
- Spouse: Milcah Goodwin
- Relations: Caleb Dorsey, Edward Dorsey, John Worthington Dorsey Jr., Col Charles Samuel Worthington
- Children: 3, including Samuel Worthington

Thomas Beale Dorsey (October 17, 1780 – December 26, 1855) was an American farmer, lawyer, politician and judge in Anne Arundel County and Maryland.

== Early life ==
Thomas Beale Dorsey was born on October 17, 1780, in Anne Arundel County, Maryland to Comfort Worthington Dorsey and John Worthington Dorsey. He attended St. John's College in Annapolis.

== Career ==
In 1807, Dorsey became a member of the Baltimore City house of delegates. He was a member of the Committee of Grievances and Courts of Justice, Committee on Laws to Expire, Committee to Consider and Report on the Communication from the Governors of New Jersey and Delaware, and the Committee to Examine Laws of Maryland Regulating the Election of Members of Congress.

In 1811, Dorsey was appointed to be the U.S. District Attorney for Maryland. Following his term, he was elected to the Maryland House of Delegates representing Anne Arundel County as a Democratic-Republican in 1813, but was defeated in his 1814 election. In 1816 and 1821, he became a senatorial elector for Anne Arundel County. He attained the position of Attorney General of Maryland in 1822, a post he held until 1824. In 1824, he was appointed as Chief Judge, First Judicial District. He remained as an associate judge for the Maryland Court of Appeals until 1848, when he became the chief judge until 1851. After 1851, he was on the board of directors of the Patapsco Female Institute.

Dorsey is credited in his efforts to convert the Howard District of Anne Arundel into Howard County. His son, John Thomas Beale, maintained a Howard County Farm, but served for the southern confederacy. He was also the father of Samuel Worthington Dorsey.

Dorsey lived at Mt. Hebron, a stone home built by his father in 1808. Dorsey operated a farm at the location with 49 slaves listed in the 1840 census. As a tobacco farmer, his products were the highest quality of the time fetching a record 319 pounds Sterling at Elkridge Landing for a 707lb hogshead in 1824. Mount Hebron High School, built in 1966, is named after the manor.

Dorsey died on December 26, 1855. He was buried in St. John's Churchyard in Ellicott City, Maryland.

== See also ==
- Woodlawn (Ellicott City, Maryland)

== Sources ==
- Nellie Arnold Plummer, Out of the Depths, Or, The Triumph of the Cross, G.K. Hall (1927)

Legal offices
Preceded by Stevenson Archer	Chief Judge of the Maryland Court of Appeals; 1848–1851	Succeeded by John Carroll LeGrand
Preceded by Luther Martin	Attorney General of Maryland; 1822–1824	Succeeded by Thomas Kell
Preceded by John Stephen	United States Attorney for the District of Maryland; 1810–1812	Succeeded by Elias Glenn
