= Hebron High School =

Hebron High School may refer to:

- Hebron High School (Ahmedabad), Ahmedabad, India
- Hebron High School (Texas), Carrollton, Texas
- Hebron High School (Indiana), Hebron, Indiana
- Mount Hebron High School, Ellicott City, Maryland
