= Brice Goldsborough (judge) =

Justice of the Maryland Court of Appeals

Brice J. Goldsborough (May 30, 1803 – July 23, 1867) was a justice of the Maryland Court of Appeals from 1860 to 1867.

== Early life, education, and career ==
Born in Cambridge, Maryland, to Dr. Richard Goldsborough and Achsah (Worthington) Goldsborough, he was a drummer boy in the War of 1812, at the age of nine. He graduated from St. John's College in Annapolis and read law under Col. Smith of Winchester, Virginia to gain admission to the bar in Cambridge bar around 1825. Goldsborough was then elected to represent Dorchester County, Maryland, in the Maryland House of Delegates in 1826, 1827, and 1829, after which he engaged in the private practice of law until 1835.

== Judicial service ==
In 1835, Governor Thomas Veazey appointed Goldsborough judge of the county court of Dorchester County, Maryland. Goldsborough served for many years as judge of the Circuit Court, and in 1861 was appointed by Governor Thomas Holliday Hicks to a seat on the state's high court, the Court of Appeals for Maryland, vacated by the death of Justice John Bowers Eccleston. Goldsborough was subsequently nominated for election to the office in 1862, winning re-election by a large margin over his competitor, James B. Groom, of Cecil County. Goldsborough remained on the court until his death, in July, 1867.

== Personal life and death ==
Goldsborough married Leah Goldsborough, a daughter of his cousin James Goldsborough, of Talbot County. They had two sons, James Richard Goldsborough, and M. Worthington Goldsborough.

He died at Cambridge, Maryland, at the age of 64.

Political offices
Preceded by John Bowers Eccleston	Judge of the Maryland Court of Appeals; 1860–1867	Succeeded by Court reconfigured
