= Cathy Reese =

American lacrosse coach

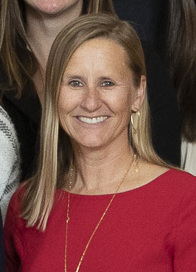
- Reese in 2019
- Born: Cathy Nelson
- Occupation: Lacrosse coach

Cathy Reese is the current head coach of the women's lacrosse team at the University of Maryland. She has coached the Maryland Terrapins to five championship wins and has been inducted into the University of Maryland Hall of Fame on November 2, 2018.

== Early life ==
Reese attended Mount Hebron High School in Ellicott City, Maryland. When she graduated in 1994, she had many accomplishments:

- Won 3 consecutive state championships
- All-Metro Player of the Year in 1994
- Maryland State 3A record with 8 points (goals+assists) in a Championship game
- Maryland State 3A record with most goals in a championship game with 7
- Scored 170 goals over the course of her final two seasons for the Vikings

== Personal life ==
Reese married former Maryland lacrosse player Brian Reese, and has four children: the oldest, Riley, second son, Brody, only daughter, Cayden and youngest son, Braxton.

== College career ==
Reese played for the University of Maryland from 1994 until 1998. During that time, the team captured four national championship wins, in 1995, 1996, 1997, and 1998. After the 1998 National Collegiate Athletics Association Tournament, Reese was named the Most Valuable Player. Reese graduated in 1998 with a bachelor of arts degree in business communication.

== Coaching career ==
After graduating, Reese was the assistant coach for the women's lacrosse team at Maryland from 1999 to 2004. She then moved to the University of Denver and served as the head coach of the women's lacrosse team from 2004 to 2006. In 2007, Reese was offered the job as the head coach at the University of Maryland. In her time as head coach at Maryland, Reese has helped her team win five national championships, in 2010, 2014, 2015, 2017 and 2019. Reese led her team to six consecutive Atlantic Coast Conference Tournament Championships, from 2009 to 2014. In her years of coaching, Reese has coached several Tewaaraton Award winners, Tewarraton Award finalists, and many All-Americans.

== Honors and awards ==
Reese has won many individual coaching awards while at Maryland. In 2007, 2009, 2010, 2011, 2012, 2013, and 2014 she was named Atlantic Coast Conference Coach of the Year, as well as being named the Big Ten Coach of the Year in 2016, 2017, and 2018. She was also named the Intercollegiate Women's Lacrosse Coaches Association National Coach of the Year in 2010, 2014, and 2015. The University of Maryland's Hall of Fame honors players and coaches who have made a significant impact on the school. On November 2, 2018, Reese was one of the nine University of Maryland alumni who were chosen to be inducted into the university's Hall of Fame. She was inducted for both her exceptional coaching and as a player.
