= Daniel Randall Magruder =

American judge (1835–1915)

Personal details
- Born: January 6, 1835 Annapolis, Maryland, U.S.
- Died: February 20, 1915 (aged 80) Annapolis, Maryland, U.S.
- Party: Democratic
- Spouse(s): Mary Sollers; Rosalie Webster
- Education: St. John's College
- Occupation: Lawyer

Daniel Randall Magruder (January 6, 1835 – February 20, 1915) was a Maryland lawyer who served by appointment as a justice of the Maryland Court of Appeals in 1881.

== Biography ==
Born in Annapolis, Maryland, to George Lee Magruder and Henrietta Sanford Randall Magruder, he attended private schools and later entered St. John's College. He was the youngest member of his class at the time of graduation, in 1853, and the last survivor. After leaving college, he began the study of law in the office of Alexander B. Hagner in Baltimore.

Magruder was admitted to the bar in 1856. He began practice in Calvert county, and in a short time was elected a member of the Maryland House of Delegates from that county. He was afterward elected judge of the circuit composed of Anne Arundel and Calvert counties, and after a change in the Constitution, was elected to the bench of the district composed of Calvert, Charles, St. Mary's and Prince George's counties. Upon the death of Judge George Brent he was appointed by Governor William T. Hamilton as chief judge of that circuit, and thereby became a member of the Court of Appeals.

Magruder ran for election to the seat later that year as a Democrat, but was narrowly defeated by Republican candidate Frederick Stone.

== Personal life and death ==
Magruder was twice married. His first wife was Miss Mary Sollers, daughter of Congressman Augustus R. Sollers. By that marriage he had one daughter, Mary R. Magruder. His second wife was Miss Rosalie Webster, of Cumberland, who, with the following children, survived him: Rosalie Magruder, Daniel R. Magruder, Eugene Magruder, a civil engineer, and Calvert Magruder, a law student at Harvard University, who would go on to become a judge of the United States Court of Appeals for the First Circuit.

Magruder died at his home in Annapolis at the age of 80, having been in grave condition for several weeks.

Political offices
Preceded by George Brent	Judge of the Maryland Court of Appeals; 1881–1881	Succeeded by Frederick Stone
