= Judge Bailey =

Judge Bailey may refer to:

- Jennings Bailey (1867–1963), judge of the United States District Court for the District of Columbia
- John P. Bailey (born 1951), judge of the United States District Court for the Northern District of West Virginia

== See also ==
- Justice Bailey (disambiguation)
