= Oliver Miller (judge) =

American judge (1824–1892)

The Honorable Oliver Miller
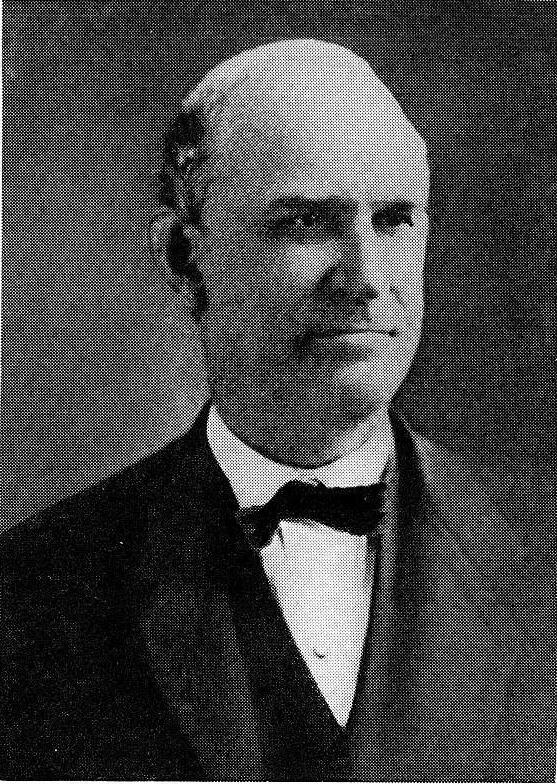

Judge of the Maryland Court of Appeals
- In office 1867–1892
- Preceded by: Newly reconfigured court
- Succeeded by: Charles Boyle Roberts

Speaker of the Maryland House of Delegates
- In office 1867–1867

Member of the Maryland House of Delegates
- In office 1865–1867

Personal details
- Born: April 15, 1824 Middletown, Connecticut, U.S.
- Died: October 18, 1892 (aged 68) Ellicott City, Maryland, U.S.
- Education: Dartmouth College

Oliver Miller (April 15, 1824 – October 18, 1892) was a justice of the Maryland Court of Appeals from 1867 to 1892.

== Early life, education, and career ==
Born in Middletown, Connecticut, to Giles and Clarissa Miller, he went to Frederick City to live with his sister, Mrs. Converse, whoso husband was principal of tha Academy in that town. He attended schools in Middletown, Frederick, Maryland, and Leesburg, Virginia, and graduated from Dartmouth College with high honors in 1848. That year he went to Annapolis and read law under Alexander Randall, gaining admission to the bar in Maryland in 1850.

Miller reported and arranged four volumes of Maryland chancery decisions by Chancellor John Johnson Jr. From 1853 to 1862 he was reporter of the Court of Appeals, reporting the Maryland Reports from the third to the eighteenth volume inclusive.

== Political and judicial service ==
Miller was a member of the constitutional convention of 1864, represented Anne Arundel county as a Democrat in the Maryland House of Delegates in 1865, 1866 and 1867. In the latter session he was Speaker of the House. At the first election under the new constitution, in November 1867, he was elected chief judge of the fifth judicial circuit, comprising the counties of Anne Arundel, Howard and Carroll, and was re-elected in 1882.

Miller resigned from the bench due to failing health on October 1, 1892.

== Personal life and death ==
Miller was married. His wife died four years before him. He died at his home in Ellicott City, Maryland, at the age of 68, and was interred in Baltimore's Loudon Park Cemetery.

Political offices
Preceded by Newly reconfigured court	Judge of the Maryland Court of Appeals; 1867–1892	Succeeded by Charles Boyle Roberts
