= Xavier Proctor =

American gridiron football player (born 1990)

No. 61, 69, 92
- Position: Offensive tackle

Personal information
- Born: November 1, 1990 (age 36); Morgantown, West Virginia, U.S.
- Listed height: 6 ft 6 in (1.98 m)
- Listed weight: 315 lb (143 kg)

Career information
- High school: Mt. Hebron (Ellicott City, Maryland)
- College: North Carolina Central
- NFL draft: 2013: undrafted

Career history
- Orlando Predators (2013); Detroit Lions (2013–2015)*; New York Giants (2015)*; Hamilton Tiger-Cats (2016)*; Orlando Predators (2016)
- * Offseason or practice squad member only
- Stats at Pro Football Reference
- Stats at ArenaFan.com

Xavier Proctor (born November 1, 1990) is an American former professional football offensive tackle. He played college football at North Carolina Central University. He was a member of the Orlando Predators, Detroit Lions, New York Giants and Hamilton Tiger-Cats.

== Early life ==
Xavier Proctor was born on November 1, 1990, in Morgantown, West Virginia. He attended Mount Hebron High School in Ellicott City, Maryland.

== College career ==
Proctor played as a defensive lineman for the North Carolina Central Eagles from 2008 to 2012. He was redshirted in 2008. He majored in history.

== Professional career ==
Proctor was signed by the Orlando Predators on July 10, 2013. He was activated from Other League Exempt on July 26, 2016.

Proctor signed with the Detroit Lions on August 1, 2013. He was released by the Lions on August 31, 2013 and re-signed to the Lions' practice squad on September 4, 2013. He was moved from defensive tackle to offensive tackle in June 2015. Proctor was released by the Lions on September 5, 2015.

Proctor was signed to the New York Giants' practice squad on October 15, 2015. He was released by the Giants on October 21, 2015.

Proctor signed with the Hamilton Tiger-Cats on April 19, 2016. He was released by the Tiger-Cats on June 19 and signed to the team's practice roster the same day. He was released by the team on June 30, 2016.
