= Levin Thomas Handy Irving =

American judge (1828–1892)

Levin Thomas Handy Irving (April 8, 1828 – August 24, 1892) was a justice of the Maryland Court of Appeals from 1879 until his death in 1892.

Born in Somerset County, Maryland, Irving graduated with distinction from Princeton University at the age of 18, and then read law with his uncle, William W. Handy, of Somerset, to gain admission to the bar in 1849.

For seven years he practiced in Salisbury, Maryland In 1856 he went to Cincinnati, where he formed a partnership with Eli P. Morton, which lasted for one year. Irving then returned to Maryland. In 1867 he was elected Associate Judge, and on the death of Judge James A. Stewart he received the appointment of Chief Judge of his circuit in April, 1879. In November 1880, he was elected without opposition to that position for a term of fifteen years.

Irving died at his home at the age of 64, having been overcome by the heat while on his way to Cambridge two weeks before, and never recovered.

Political offices
Preceded by James Augustus Stewart	Judge of the Maryland Court of Appeals; 1879–1892	Succeeded by Henry Page
