= John G. Rogers =

American judge (1849–1926)

John Gough Rogers (1849 – October 29, 1926) was an American state senator, schools superintendent, and justice of the Maryland Court of Appeals in 1907. He served in the Maryland Senate and was president pro tempore in 1894.

He was born at Wyoming Farm in Clinton, Maryland, the son of Doctor and Mrs. Samuel Rogers. Besides serving the unexpired term of Chief Judge I. Thomas Jones on the Circuit Court for Howard County, he served as superintendent of schools and was a state senator. Rogers was survived by three daughters, Mrs. Jacob Baer, Mrs. Edward Hammond and Miss Lelia Rogers, as well as by two sons, Ruben D. Rogers and John G. Rogers.

He was identified as a likely candidate for a circuit judge position.

When he died he was the eldest member of the Howard County bar. He died in a doorway near the Courthouse at Ellicott City. His funeral was planned to be at St. John's Protestant Episcopal Church in Ellicott City and his burial in St. John's Churchyard.

Political offices
Preceded by Isaac Thomas Jones	Judge of the Maryland Court of Appeals; 1907–1907	Succeeded by William H. Thomas
