= Stedman Prescott =

American judge (1896–1968)

20th Chief Judge of the Maryland Court of Appeals
- In office 1964 – August 30, 1966
- Preceded by: William L. Henderson
- Succeeded by: Hall Hammond

Member of the Maryland Senate
- In office 1935–1938

Member of the Rockville City Council
- In office 1924–1930

Personal details
- Born: August 30, 1896 Norbeck, Maryland, U.S.
- Died: November 14, 1968 (aged 72)
- Party: Democratic
- Spouse: Edith Callender Minnick (m. 1917)
- Children: 4
- Parent(s): Alexander F. Prescott; Edith Stanley Kellogg Prescott
- Education: Rockville High School; Georgetown University (LLB)
- Profession: Jurist

Military service
- Allegiance: United States
- Branch/service: United States Army
- Years of service: 1917–1918
- Battles/wars: World War I

Stedman Prescott (August 30, 1896 – November 14, 1968) was an American jurist who served as Chief Judge of the Maryland Court of Appeals.

== Biography ==
Prescott was born in Norbeck, Montgomery County, Maryland to Alexander F. Prescott and Edith Stanley Kellogg Prescott. He was initially educated at Rockville Academy, and graduated in 1914 from Rockville High School. He attended Georgetown University, where he in 1919 received his LL.B. degree. He also served in the United States Army from 1917 to 1918, during World War I.

In 1924, Prescott was admitted to the Maryland Bar and engaged in private practice as a defense attorney in Rockville. He served as a member of the Rockville City Council from 1924 to 1930, as state's attorney for Montgomery County from 1930 to 1934, and as a member of the Maryland Senate from 1935 to 1938.

Prescott was confirmed as an associate judge of the 6th District of the Montgomery County Circuit in 1938, and was later confirmed as Chief Judge of the circuit in 1955. He served in that position until 1958, when he was chosen to serve on the Maryland Court of Appeals as an associate judge. He was appointed Chief Judge in 1964, and served until August 30, 1966.

Prescott married Edith Callender Minnick on July 14, 1917, with whom he had four children: Calla P. Belt, Stedman Prescott, Jr., Mary P. Rosenberger, and Anne P. Brandau.

Legal offices
Preceded by William L. Henderson	Chief Judge of the Maryland Court of Appeals; 1964–1966	Succeeded by Hall Hammond
