= George Mitchell Russum =

American judge (1834–1901)

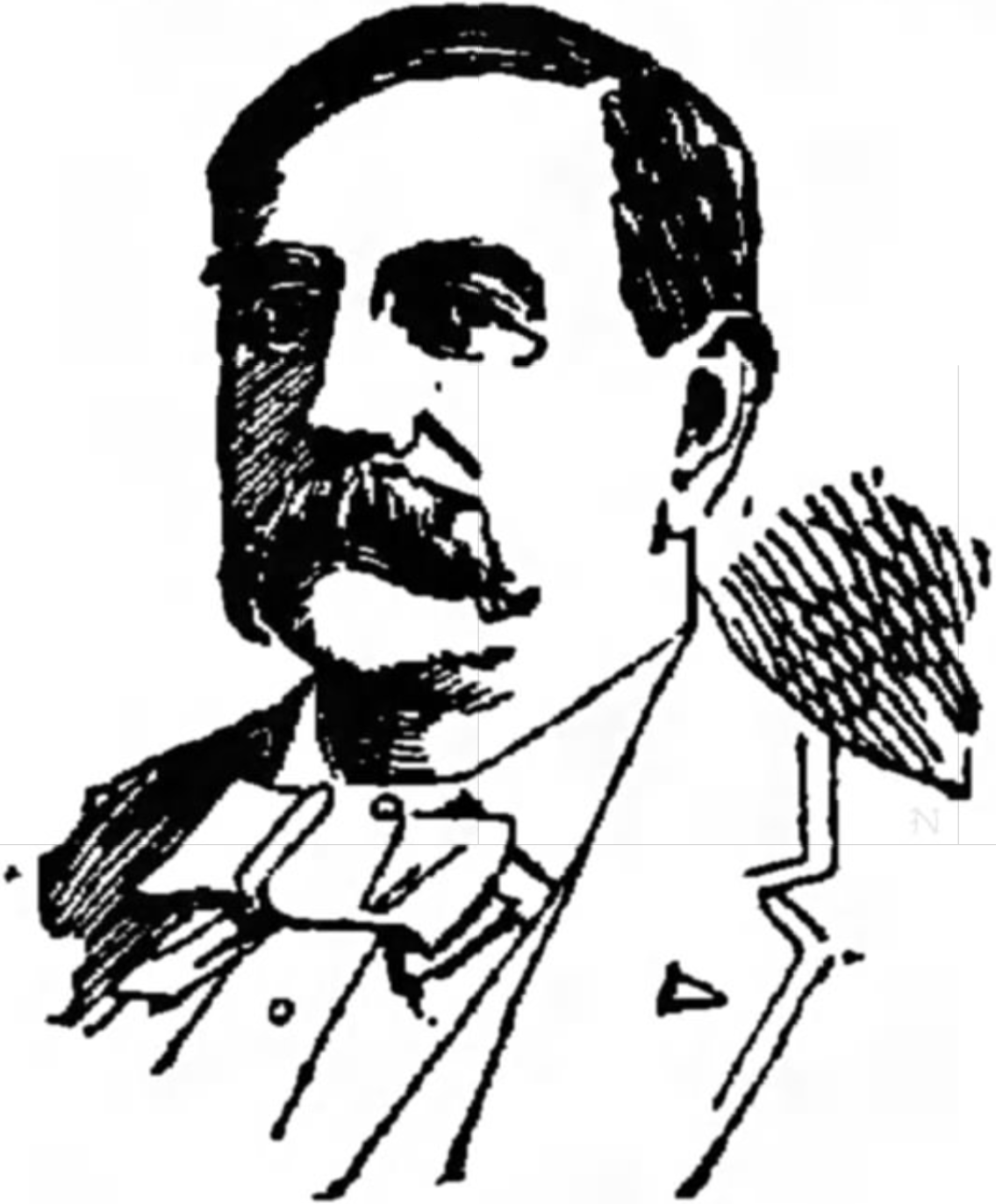
- Sketch of Russum, c. 1901

Judge of the Maryland Court of Appeals
- In office 1896–1897
- Preceded by: John Mitchell Robinson
- Succeeded by: James Alfred Pearce

Personal details
- Born: January 28, 1834 Wye Mills, Maryland, U.S.
- Died: October 21, 1901 (aged 67) Denton, Maryland, U.S.
- Resting place: Denton, Maryland, U.S.
- Party: Republican
- Spouse(s): Mary Virginia George; Octivia Orme George
- Education: Princeton University; Yale Law School
- Occupation: Lawyer; judge

George Mitchell Russum (January 28, 1834 – October 21, 1901) was a justice of the Maryland Court of Appeals from 1896 to 1897.

== Early life ==
George Mitchell Russum was born on January 28, 1834, at Wye Mills in Talbot County, Maryland to Sarah (née George) and Dr. Lydenham Thorne Russum. His mother was the daughter of Joseph W. George of Queen Anne's County. His father was the grandson of Major William Russum of Somerset County. He attended public schools and Strasburg Academy in Lancaster County, Pennsylvania. He attended Princeton University, but left after the sudden death of his father in April 1852. He studied law at Cook & Hopper and graduated from Yale Law School in 1855. He was admitted to the bar in 1855 and settled in Denton, Maryland.

== Career ==
Russum was an active Unionist in the American Civil War. In 1862, President Abraham Lincoln appointed Russum as the assessor of internal revenue in Maryland's 1st congressional district. He resigned the role in 1865.

In 1866, Russum was the Republican candidate for the 1st congressional district, but lost to Hiram McCullough. In 1867, Russum was appointed by Chief Justice Salmon P. Chase as register in bankruptcy for the same district. He served in that role until the appeal of the Bankruptcy Act of 1867.

In 1871, Russum was elected as state's attorney of Caroline County, Maryland until January 1880. In 1882, he was a candidate for associate judge of the Second Judicial Circuit, but was defeated. He was a candidate for Congress again in 1884, but lost to Charles Hopper Gibson. In 1889, he was a candidate for Maryland State Senate, but lost to John F. Dawson. He ran again in 1890 and 1892 for Congress, but lost to Henry Page and Robert F. Brattan, respectively.

From 1886 to 1896, Russum was counsel for Pennsylvania Railroad. On January 21, 1896, Russum was appointed by Governor Lloyd Lowndes as chief judge of the Second Judicial Court. He then took his seat on the Maryland Court of Appeals and was nominated for election in 1897 but lost to James Alfred Pearce.

== Personal life ==
Russum married Mary Virginia George and later married Octavia Orme George, both daughters of Queen Anne's County politician Dr. Enoch George and granddaughters of Enoch George.

Russum died on October 21, 1901, while walking in Denton. He was buried in West Denton.

Political offices
Preceded by John Mitchell Robinson	Judge of the Maryland Court of Appeals; 1896–1897	Succeeded by James Alfred Pearce
