= James A. C. Bond =

American judge (1844–1930)

James Alexander Chesley Bond (September 23, 1844 – August 17, 1930) was an American lawyer and judge who served as a justice of the Maryland Court of Appeals, the highest appellate court in the state, in 1899.

== Early life and education ==
Born in Calvert County, Maryland, to James Alexander and Sarah Elizabeth Chesley Hance Bond, his father was a planter and frequent a candidate for public office, for which he was never defeated.

Bond graduated from Charlotte Hall Military Academy in St. Mary's County in 1863, and from Princeton University in 1866. He read law under James T. Briscoe and then under U.S. Attorney William Meade Addison to gain admission to the bar in Baltimore, and entered private practice in Westminster, Maryland, in 1868.

== Judicial career and later life ==
In April 1890, Governor Elihu Emory Jackson appointed Bond as an associate judge of the Maryland Fifth Judicial Circuit, and Bond held the office until November 1891, when he returned to private practice. In September 1899, he was appointed chief judge of the Maryland Fifth Judicial Circuit by Governor Lloyd Lowndes, to a seat vacated by the death of Judge Charles B. Roberts. This automatically placed Bond on the state supreme court, which at that time included the chief judges of each circuit. Bond was immediately thereafter nominated by the Republican Party for election to the position, but was defeated in the election by a fellow Fifth Circuit judge, Isaac Thomas Jones. During his brief tenure, he participated in several landmark decisions, and was noted for his careful deliberation and legal acumen.

In 1904, Bond was elected president of the Maryland Bar Association. He was for many years division counsel for the State of Maryland for the Baltimore and Ohio Railroad. For a number of years his law partner was Francis Neal Parke, who later became chief judge of the Maryland Fifth Judicial Circuit. Upon Parke's elevation to the bench, Bond took into association as his partner James E. Boylan Jr., and became an advisory member of the firm, Boylan being the active member.

== Personal life ==
In 1872, Bond married Selina Fiddis, of Westminster, with whom he had one son, Dr. James A. Bond, and one daughter who survived him. Selina Bond died several years before Bond.

After retiring from the court, Bond continued to be involved in public life. In a 1927 interview, he shared his thoughts on his life's work and the evolution of Maryland's legal system.

Bond died at his home in Westminster on August 17, 1930, at the age of 85, following a lengthy period of infirmity.

Political offices
Preceded by Charles B. Roberts	Judge of the Maryland Court of Appeals; 1899–1899	Succeeded by Isaac Thomas Jones
