= Alexander Contee Magruder =

American judge (c. 1779–1853)

Alexander Contee Magruder (c. 1779–1853) was a Maryland politician and judge. He served as a member of the Governor's Council from 1812 to 1815. He represented Anne Arundel County in the Maryland Senate from 1838 to 1841, also serving as Mayor of Annapolis, Maryland from 1840 to 1843. He was then a justice of the Maryland Court of Appeals from 1844 to 1851, when the court was reconfigured.

Political offices
Preceded by John Stephen	Judge of the Maryland Court of Appeals; 1844–1851	Succeeded by Court restructured
