= Charles B. Roberts =

American politician (1842–1899)

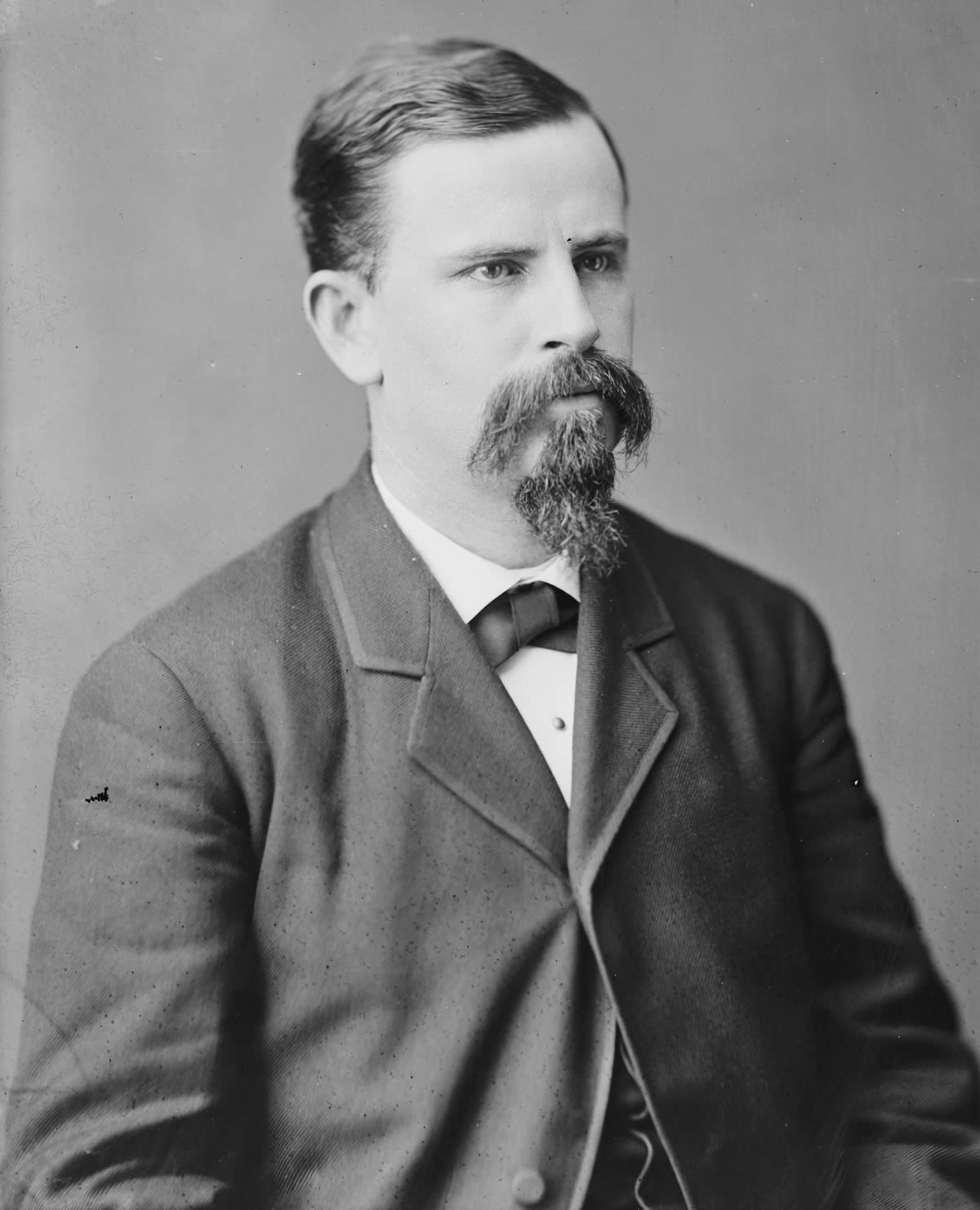
Charles Boyle Roberts

Charles Boyle Roberts (April 19, 1842 – September 10, 1899) was a U.S. Congressman from Maryland, serving the second district from 1875 to 1879.

Roberts was born in Uniontown, Maryland, and graduated from Calvert College of New Windsor, Maryland, in 1861. He studied law, and was admitted to the bar in 1864, commencing practice in Westminster, Maryland. He was elected as a Democrat to the Forty-fourth and Forty-fifth Congresses (March 4, 1875 – March 3, 1879), and was chairman of the Committee on Accounts (Forty-fourth and Forty-fifth Congresses). He was elected Attorney General of Maryland in 1883, serving one term. He was elected associate judge of the fifth judicial district in 1891. He was soon thereafter appointed chief judge of the district to fill the vacancy caused by the death of Judge Miller, thereby automatically becoming a member of the state's highest court, the Maryland Court of Appeals. In 1893, was elected for the full term of 15 years. Roberts died in Westminster in 1899, and is interred in the Catholic Cemetery.

U.S. House of Representatives
Preceded by Stevenson Archer	U.S. Congressman from the 2nd district of Maryland; 1875–1879	Succeeded by J. Frederick C. Talbott
Legal offices
Preceded by Charles J. M. Gwinn	Attorney General of Maryland; 1883–1887	Succeeded by William Pinkney Whyte
Preceded by Oliver Miller	Judge of the Maryland Court of Appeals; 1892–1899	Succeeded by James A. C. Bond
