= Jeremiah Chase =

American judge (1748–1828)

Jeremiah Townley Chase
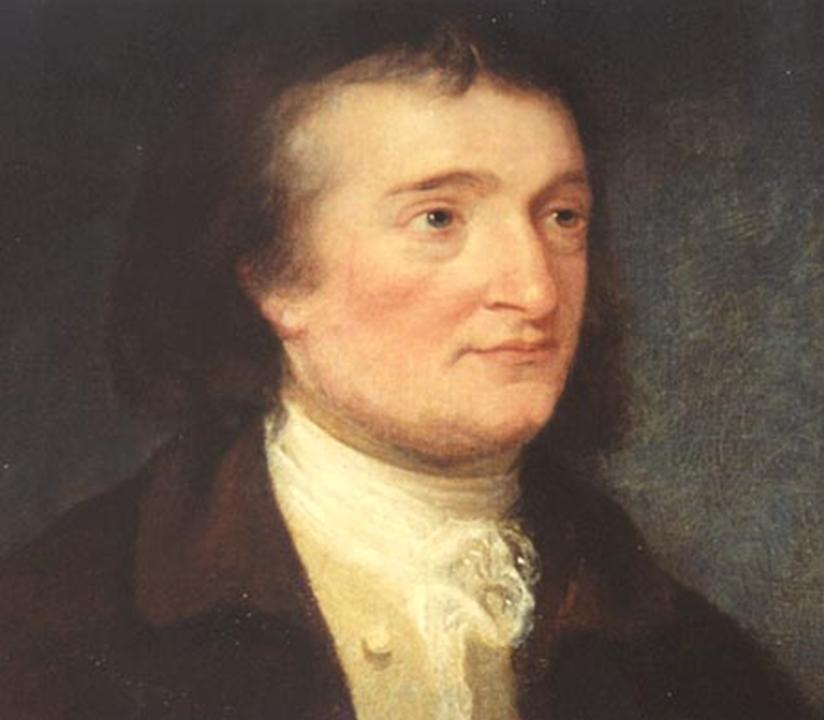
- Portrait of Jeremiah Townley Chase, by Robert Edge Pine. The portrait is located in the entrance hall of the Hammond-Harwood House in Annapolis, Maryland

Chief Judge of the Maryland Court of Appeals
- In office 1806–1824
- Preceded by: Benjamin Rumsey
- Succeeded by: John Buchanan

Lord Mayor of Annapolis
- In office 1783–1784
- Preceded by: James Brice
- Succeeded by: Nicholas Carroll

Personal details
- Born: May 23, 1748 Baltimore, Province of Maryland, British America
- Died: May 11, 1828 (aged 79) Annapolis, Maryland, U.S.
- Resting place: St. Anne's Cemetery; Annapolis, Maryland, U.S.
- Party: Anti-Federalist
- Spouse: Hester Baldwin (m. 1779; died 1823)
- Children: 5
- Relatives: Samuel Chase (cousin); John Francis Mercer (cousin)

Jeremiah Townley Chase (May 23, 1748 – May 11, 1828) was an American lawyer, jurist, and land speculator from Annapolis, Maryland. He served as a delegate for Maryland in the Continental Congress of 1783 and 1784, and for many years was chief justice of the state’s court of appeals.

== Early life ==
Chase was born in Baltimore, Maryland, to Richard and Catherine Chase. When both his parents died in 1757 he was adopted by his uncle Reverend Thomas Chase, who was the Anglican rector of St. Paul's parish in Annapolis. (St. Paul's later became part of the American Episcopal Church.) His uncle also took over his education as he had done earlier for his own son, Samuel Chase.

When Jeremiah Chase was a young man, he followed his second cousin Samuel Chase to Annapolis. He read law in Samuel's office and was admitted to the bar of Anne Arundel County in 1771. Chase established a practice in both Annapolis and Baltimore, which he continued in Annapolis until 1791 with interruptions for public service. He never went into practice with his cousin but they made several appearances in court for the same clients, and a few as opponents. There were several young men who studied law with both cousins, especially when one was out of town. This list of men included Roger B. Taney who was later Chief Justice of the United States.

He married Hester Baldwin on June 24, 1779.

== Political career ==
In 1773 Chase was elected to the Colonial House of Delegates. In 1774 he joined the prerevolutionary Maryland Committee of Correspondence for Baltimore and was elected to the revolutionary Annapolis Convention that created the state constitution of Maryland. In 1776 he attended the state's Constitutional Convention for Anne Arundel County. Under the new constitution he was elected to the House of Deputies in Baltimore from 1775 to 1777.

Chase's adopted father, Rev. Chase, died in 1779 and after that Jeremiah moved fully to Annapolis. That same year he was named a member of Maryland's Executive Council, which functioned as the upper house of the legislature, and he would serve there until 1783, and later from 1785 to 1788. Chase was also Lord Mayor of Annapolis in 1783 and 1784. Those same years he served as a delegate to the Continental Congress, which held sessions for those years in Annapolis. It was there he became a friend of David Howell of Rhode Island.

In 1788 Chase was a delegate to the Maryland convention called to ratify the United States Constitution. He was among those opposed to its adoption, believing that a Bill of Rights should be included. When the Bill of Rights was formally adopted by Congress in 1789, Chase generally became a supporter of the Federalist Party. He drafted the Northwest Ordinance of 1784 as part of its drafting committee.

Jeremiah Chase and his cousin, John Francis Mercer vehemently opposed the Federal Constitution's ratification. Being elected to the state convention, he became an Anti-Federalist leader. Chase feared the Federalists would abolish state laws protecting personal rights, and he called for a federal bill of rights at the convention.

Having owned 11 slaves, by mid-1780s Chase was of the opinion Maryland's slaves should be freed. At the 1788 state ratification convention he spoke against slavery being supported by a federal Constitution. He was one of 12 leaders who voted against the federal Constitution's ratification.

== Judicial career ==
Chase returned to state politics after the constitutional crisis. Despite his opposition to the Constitution, Chase was named as a justice in the state's General Court in 1789, serving for six years. He held the tax commissioner office of Anne Arundel County in 1788. As tax commissioner, together with Charles Ridgely and his cousin Samuel, he speculated in ex-Tory lands in Annapolis and the port of Baltimore. He also served in the Maryland State Senate in 1796, where he became a strong Republican in a Federalist state. In 1806 he was appointed chief justice of the Maryland Court of Appeals, for the third district, until 1826, retiring that year.

== Later life ==
Jeremiah Chase remained married to Hester Baldwin until her death in 1823 and had five children: Richard, Frances, Hester, Matilda, and Catherine. He rented a wing of the Hammond House from Matthias Hammond as a law office. His residence was on nearby King George Street. In 1811 he purchased the Hammond-Harwood House for his eldest daughter Frances Lookcerman to live in with her husband Richard Loockerman. It was customary for the father-in-law to give the deed to his son-in-law. However, Judge Chase did not trust his son-in-law, and kept the deed in his name. When Chase died at home in Annapolis on May 11, 1828, he was buried in the City Cemetery, or St. Anne's Cemetery in Annapolis. Some of his land was confiscated by the state from former Tories.

The Hammond-Harwood House still stands on Maryland Avenue at King George Street in Annapolis. The home is operated as a museum and is open to visitors. The museum interprets the Loockerman family living in the house.

Legal offices
Preceded by Benjamin Rumsey	Chief Judge of the Maryland Court of Appeals; 1806–1824	Succeeded by John Buchanan
