= James F. Couch Jr. =

American judge (c. 1918–1990)

James F. Couch Jr. (c. 1918 – March 4, 1990) was a justice of the Maryland Court of Appeals from 1982 to 1987.

== Early life, education, and military service ==
Born in Des Moines, Iowa, Couch attended Western High School in Maryland, and received his undergraduate degree from George Washington University, and a law degree from American University's Washington College of Law, 1941. He served in the United States Army in World War II. After the war, Couch entered private practice, in which he "did mainly civil work" until he became a judge.

== Judicial service ==
In 1971, Couch was appointed to the county Prince George's County district court. The following year, Couch was elevated to the Circuit Court encompassing Prince George's County and Southern Maryland, where he served until 1977. He then served on Maryland's Court of Special Appeals from 1977 to 1982, during which time, Couch chaired the state's Judicial Ethics Committee, resigning from that position upon his elevation to the state supreme court.

On February 17, 1982, he was appointed by Governor Harry Hughes to serve on the Court of Appeals, remaining until his retirement in 1987. At the time of his appointment in 1982, it was reported that he had "not shown any definite political or social policy in his decisions", but had a reputation "as a moderate conservative".

At the time of his death he was the "only judge to have served at all four levels of Maryland's courts".

== Personal life and death ==
On February 28, 1941, Couch married Evelyn Brodie of Aiken County, South Carolina, with whom had one son. Couch died of cancer at Washington Adventist Hospital at the age of 72.

Political offices
| Preceded by J. Dudley Digges | Judge of the Maryland Court of Appeals; 1982–1987 | Succeeded by Albert T. Blackwell Jr. |
