= Hebron, Shelby County, Missouri =

Extinct hamlet in Missouri, U.S.

Coordinates: 39°53′32″N 92°01′48″W

Hebron is an extinct town in Shelby County, in the U.S. state of Missouri. The GNIS classifies it as a populated place.

Hebron was founded in the 1840s, and named after the ancient city of Hebron, a place mentioned in the Hebrew Bible.
