= Peter Killough =

American judge (born 1960)

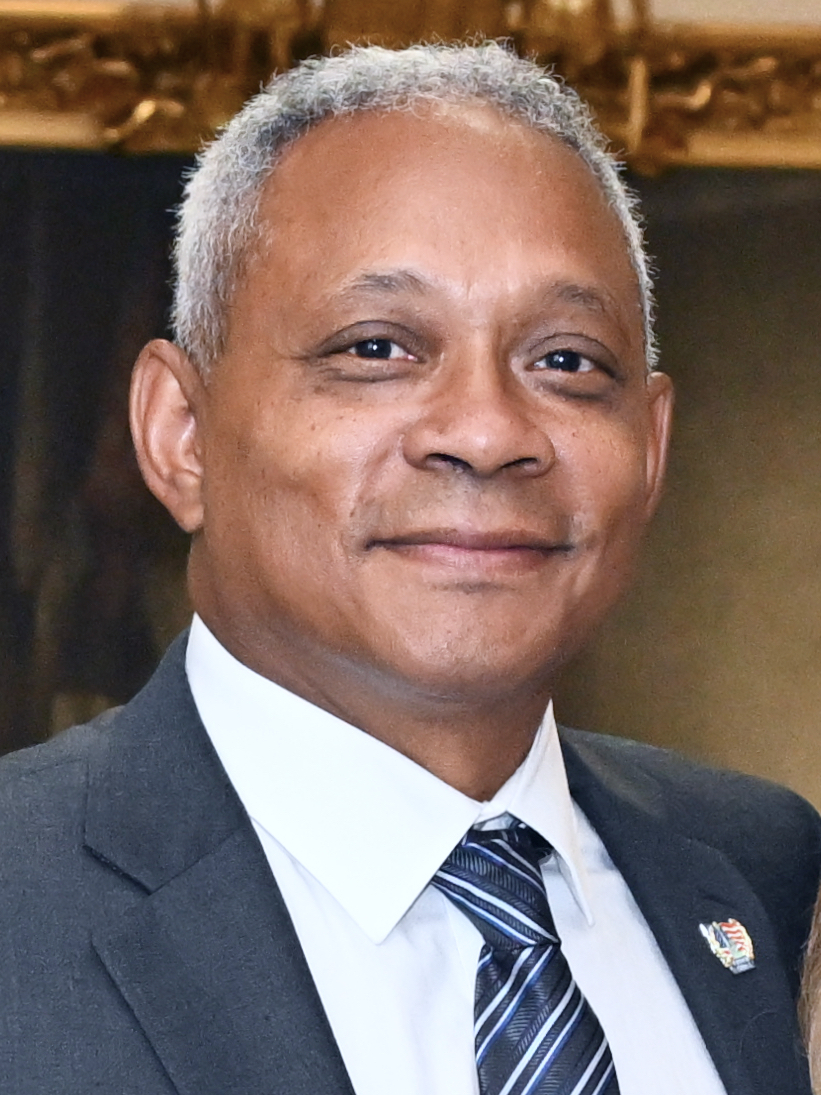

Justice of the Maryland Supreme Court
- Incumbent
- Assumed office July 31, 2024
- Appointed by: Wes Moore
- Preceded by: Michele D. Hotten

Personal details
- Born: December 30, 1960 (age 65) Detroit, Michigan, U.S.
- Spouse: Jamila
- Children: 4
- Education: New York University (BA); University of Virginia (JD)

Military service
- Allegiance: United States
- Branch/service: United States Army
- Years of service: 1983–1989
- Rank: Captain
- Awards: Army Commendation Medal; Army Achievement Medal

Peter Kevin Killough (born December 30, 1960) is an American lawyer who has served as a justice of the Supreme Court of Maryland since 2024. He previously served as an associate judge of the Prince George's County Circuit Court from 2018 to 2024.

== Early life and education ==
Killough was born in Detroit, Michigan, in 1960. He grew up in Michigan, where he played football and baseball. He attended New York University, where he served as a member of the New York Army National Guard and earned a Bachelor of Arts degree in history in 1983. Afterwards, Killough served as a captain in the U.S. Army until 1986, during which he received an Army Commendation Medal with oak leaf cluster and an Army Achievement Medal. He served as a member of the United States Army Reserves while he attended the University of Virginia, where he earned a Juris Doctor degree in 1989.

== Career ==
After graduating from Virginia, Killough was admitted to practice in New York, the District of Columbia, and Maryland, as well as the U.S. District Courts for the District of Columbia and the District of Maryland. He worked as an attorney for Carter Ledyard & Milburn from 1989 to 2006, afterwards working as a senior attorney for the Ford Motor Company until 2008. From 2009 to 2018, Killough worked as an assistant attorney for the Attorney General of Maryland, first as a counsel for the People's Insurance Counsel Division and then as the director of the Maryland Medicaid Fraud Unit. In this capacity, Killough challenged Allstate's decision to stop offering new homeowners' policies in coastal parts of the state, advocated for the Maryland Court of Appeals to abandon its practice of deferring to insurance companies' interpretation of policy terms in legal cases, and supported legislation to ban "forced bundling" by insurers.

On November 30, 2017, Governor Larry Hogan appointed Killough as an associate judge of the Prince George's County Circuit Court from the seventh district. He was sworn in on January 5, 2018. In September 2022, Killough was removed from being the main judge to handle juvenile cases by Prince George's County Administrative Judge Sheila Tillerson Adams following complaints that he was being too lenient on youth offenders. In May 2024, he applied to fill the Maryland Supreme Court seat vacancy left by Justice Michele D. Hotten, who had reached the mandatory retirement age in April. Governor Wes Moore appointed Killough to the Supreme Court on July 26, 2024, and he was sworn in on July 31, 2024. His nomination was confirmed by the Maryland Senate by a vote of 38–2 on February 3, 2025.

== Personal life ==
Killough is married to his wife, Jamila. Together, they have two children. He also has two children from a previous marriage.

== See also ==
- List of African American jurists

Legal offices
Preceded by Michele D. Hotten	Justice of the Maryland Supreme Court; 2024–present	Incumbent
