= Hebron, Ghana =

Hebron
- Town
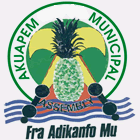
- Akuapim South Municipal District logo

- Location of Hebron in Eastern Region, Ghana
- Coordinates: 05°48′00″N 00°21′00″W
- Country: Ghana
- Region: Eastern Region
- District: Nsawam-Adoagyire Municipal

Population
  - Total
- Time zone: GMT
  - Summer (DST): GMT

Hebron is a town near Nsawam in southern Ghana and in the Nsawam-Adoagyire Municipal District, a district in the Eastern Region of south Ghana. Hebron falls under the administrative district of Nsawam-Adoagyire Municipal District (ASMD). Hebron is situated on the main Accra to Nsawam a highway to Kumasi.

== Prayer Camp ==
Hebron is the location of a prayer camp called Hebron prayer camp which is under the Church of Pentecost.

== Climate ==
Climate data for Nsawam
| Month | Jan | Feb | Mar | Apr | May | Jun | Jul | Aug | Sep | Oct | Nov | Dec | Year |
|---|---|---|---|---|---|---|---|---|---|---|---|---|---|
| Mean daily maximum °C (°F) | 32 (90) | 32 (90) | 32 (90) | 32 (89) | 31 (87) | 29 (85) | 28 (82) | 28 (82) | 28 (82) | 30 (86) | 32 (89) | 31 (88) | 32 (90) |
| Mean daily minimum °C (°F) | 24 (75) | 24 (75) | 24 (76) | 24 (76) | 24 (75) | 23 (73) | 23 (73) | 23 (73) | 23 (73) | 23 (73) | 23 (73) | 23 (73) | 23 (73) |
| Average precipitation mm (inches) | 7.6 (0.3) | 25 (1.0) | 25 (1.0) | 100 (4.0) | 150 (6.0) | 150 (6.0) | 76 (3.0) | 25 (1.0) | 76 (3.0) | 76 (3.0) | 25 (1.0) | 5.1 (0.2) | 750 (29.5) |
Source: Myweather2.com
