= Marbury School =

Marbury School may refer to:

- Marbury High School, Alabama
- Marbury School, Aldgate in the Adelaide Hills, South Australia
