= Mount Hebron Cemetery =

Mount Hebron Cemetery may refer to:

- Mount Hebron Cemetery (Montclair, New Jersey), United States
- Mount Hebron Cemetery (New York City), New York, United States
- Mount Hebron Cemetery and Gatehouse, Winchester, Virginia, United States
