= Marbury Hall =

Marbury Hall may refer to:

- Marbury Hall, Anderton with Marbury, Cheshire;
- Marbury Hall, Marbury cum Quoisley
- Marbury Hall, a locomotive
