= William H. Adkins II =

American judge (1925–2003)

William H. Adkins II (1925 – February 17, 2003) was a justice of the Maryland Court of Appeals from 1986 to 1990.

Adkins was born in New York, New York and raised in Wilson Point, Connecticut. He attended The Albany Academy before graduating from Williams College and Harvard Law School. He served in World War II as an infantryman in Italy. After graduating from law school, he moved to Easton, Maryland to practice law.

In 1982, he was appointed to the Appellate Court of Maryland by Harry Hughes before moving to the Court of Appeals in 1986.

His grandfather, William H. Adkins, also served on the Maryland Court of Appeals from 1919 to 1934. His son, William H. Adkins III, was also a judge on the Talbot County District Court.

Political offices
Preceded by Marvin H. Smith	Judge of the Maryland Court of Appeals; 1986–1990	Succeeded by Robert L. Karwacki
