= Mt Hebron (Ellicott City) =

Mount Hebron
- Location within Maryland
- 39°15′00″N 76°50′00″W
- Location: Ellicott City, Maryland

History
- Built: 1808

Site notes
- Architectural style: Stone

Mount Hebron is a historic home located in Ellicott City, Howard County, Maryland.

Mount Hebron was built by Col. John Worthington Dorsey of the Revolutionary war in 1808 for his son Thomas Beale Dorsey. The house is a two-story stone structure. Dorsey operated a farm at the location with 49 slaves listed in the 1840 census. Mount Hebron High School, built in 1966, is named after the manor.

== See also ==
- List of Howard County properties in the Maryland Historical Trust
- MacAlpine
