= Frederick Brune =

American judge

18th Chief Judge of the Maryland Court of Appeals
- In office 1954–1964
- Preceded by: Simon Sobeloff
- Succeeded by: William L. Henderson

Personal details
- Born: Frederick William Brune IV; October 15, 1894; Baltimore, Maryland, U.S.
- Died: February 19, 1972 (aged 77)
- Spouse: Mary Washington Keyser
- Children: 2
- Parent(s): Frederick William Brune III; Blance Shoemaker Brune
- Education: Johns Hopkins University; Harvard College (BA); Harvard Law School (LLB)
- Profession: Jurist

Military service
- Allegiance: United States
- Branch/service: United States Army

Frederick William Brune IV (October 15, 1894 – February 19, 1972) was an American jurist who served as Chief Judge of the Maryland Court of Appeals.

Brune was born in Baltimore, Maryland to Frederick William Brune III and Blanche Shoemaker Brune. He received his early education from Gilman School. He attended Johns Hopkins University, and graduated with a B.A. from Harvard College in 1915. He graduated from the Harvard University School of Law with an LL.B. in 1920.

During World War I, Brune served in the United States Army Intelligence and Ambulance Corps. He was admitted to the Maryland Bar in 1921, and worked as an assistant U.S. Attorney from 1923 to 1924. He entered into private practice with William Coleman and Edward Morgan in 1924, and later worked in the practice of Morgan & Brune from 1927 to 1928. He later worked in the practice of Semmes, Bowen, & Semmes from 1928 to 1954.

In 1954, Brune was appointed Chief Judge of the Maryland Court of Appeals, where he served until 1964. Brune also held positions of President of the Baltimore Bar Association (1939–1940); President of the Maryland Bar Association (1947–1948); fellow of the American Bar Association; President of the Maryland Historical Society; and as a member of the Board of Visitors of Harvard Law School.

Brune was married to Mary Washington Keyser, with whom he had two children, Frederick William Brune V and Caroline, who died in infancy.

Legal offices
Preceded by Simon Sobeloff	Chief Judge of the Maryland Court of Appeals; 1954–1964	Succeeded by William L. Henderson
