= Carroll Bond =

American judge (1873–1943)

Carroll T. Bond
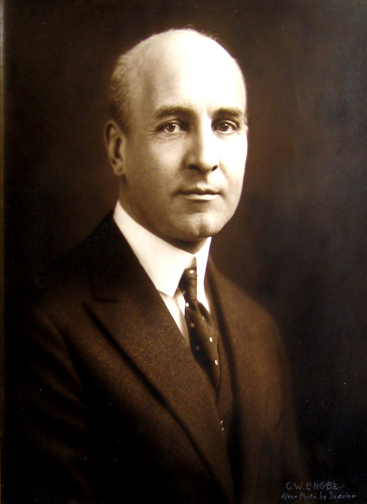

Chief Judge of the Maryland Court of Appeals
- In office 1924–1943
- Preceded by: Andrew Hunter Boyd
- Succeeded by: D. Lindley Sloan

Personal details
- Born: June 13, 1873 Baltimore, Maryland, U.S.
- Died: January 18, 1943 (aged 69) Baltimore, Maryland, U.S.
- Resting place: Green Mount Cemetery; Baltimore, Maryland, U.S.
- Education: Harvard University (B.A.); University of Maryland School of Law (LL.B.)

Military service
- Allegiance: United States
- Branch/service: Maryland National Guard
- Years of service: 1896–1899
- Battles/wars: Spanish–American War

Carroll T. Bond (June 13, 1873 – January 18, 1943) was an American jurist who served as chief judge of the Maryland Court of Appeals, the supreme court of the U.S. state of Maryland.

== Early life ==
Carroll T. Bond was born on June 13, 1873, in Baltimore, Maryland to Elizabeth (née Lyon) and James Bond, and attended Lamb's School and Phillips Exeter Academy as a youth. He received his B.A. degree from Harvard University in 1894, and his LL.B. degree from the University of Maryland School of Law in 1896. He was admitted to the Maryland Bar the same year. He never married.

== Career ==
Bond served in the Maryland National Guard from 1896 to 1899, during the Spanish–American War. He went on to practice law in Baltimore for 15 years, including service with the law firms of Marshall, Marbury, & Bowdoin; Marbury & Bowdoin; Williams & Bond; and Marbury & Gosnell. He also served as a member of the Board of School Commissions of Baltimore for some period after 1911.

As a jurist, Bond served as a trial judge on the Supreme Bench of Baltimore City from 1911 to 1924. He was appointed an associate judge of the Maryland Court of Appeals in 1924, and promoted to chief judge that same year. He served as chief judge until his death.

== Personal life ==
Bond did not marry. He died on December 18, 1943, in Baltimore. Bond was interred in Green Mount Cemetery of Baltimore.

Legal offices
Preceded by Andrew Hunter Boyd	Chief Judge of the Maryland Court of Appeals; 1924–1943	Succeeded by D. Lindley Sloan
