= Howard S. Chasanow =

American judge (1937–2017)

Howard S. Chasanow (April 3, 1937 – April 2, 2017) was a justice of the Maryland Court of Appeals from 1990 to 1999.

== Biography ==
Born in Washington, D.C., Chasanow completed a BA at the University of Maryland, College Park (1958), a JD (first in his class) at the then University of Maryland School of Law (1961), and an LLM at Harvard Law School (1962). He was an assistant and deputy state's attorney after law school. His first judgeship was in 1971 for the district court for Prince George's County. In 1990, Governor William Donald Schaefer appointed Chasanow to the Court of Appeals. His retirement from the Court of Appeals was in 1999. While a judge, he was also a lecturer at University of Maryland Francis King Carey School of Law and the National Judicial College at different points.

== Personal life and death ==
Chasanow was married to federal judge Deborah K. Chasanow until his death. He died in Baltimore in 2017, one day shy of his 80th birthday.

Political offices
| Preceded by Albert T. Blackwell Jr. | Judge of the Maryland Court of Appeals; 1990–1999 | Succeeded by Glenn T. Harrell Jr. |
