= Hebron Township =

Hebron Township may refer to:

- Hebron Township, McHenry County, Illinois
- Hebron Township, Kossuth County, Iowa
- Hebron Township, Michigan
- Hebron Township, Williams County, North Dakota, in Williams County, North Dakota
- Hebron Township, Potter County, Pennsylvania
