= Jonathan Biran =

American judge (born 1966)

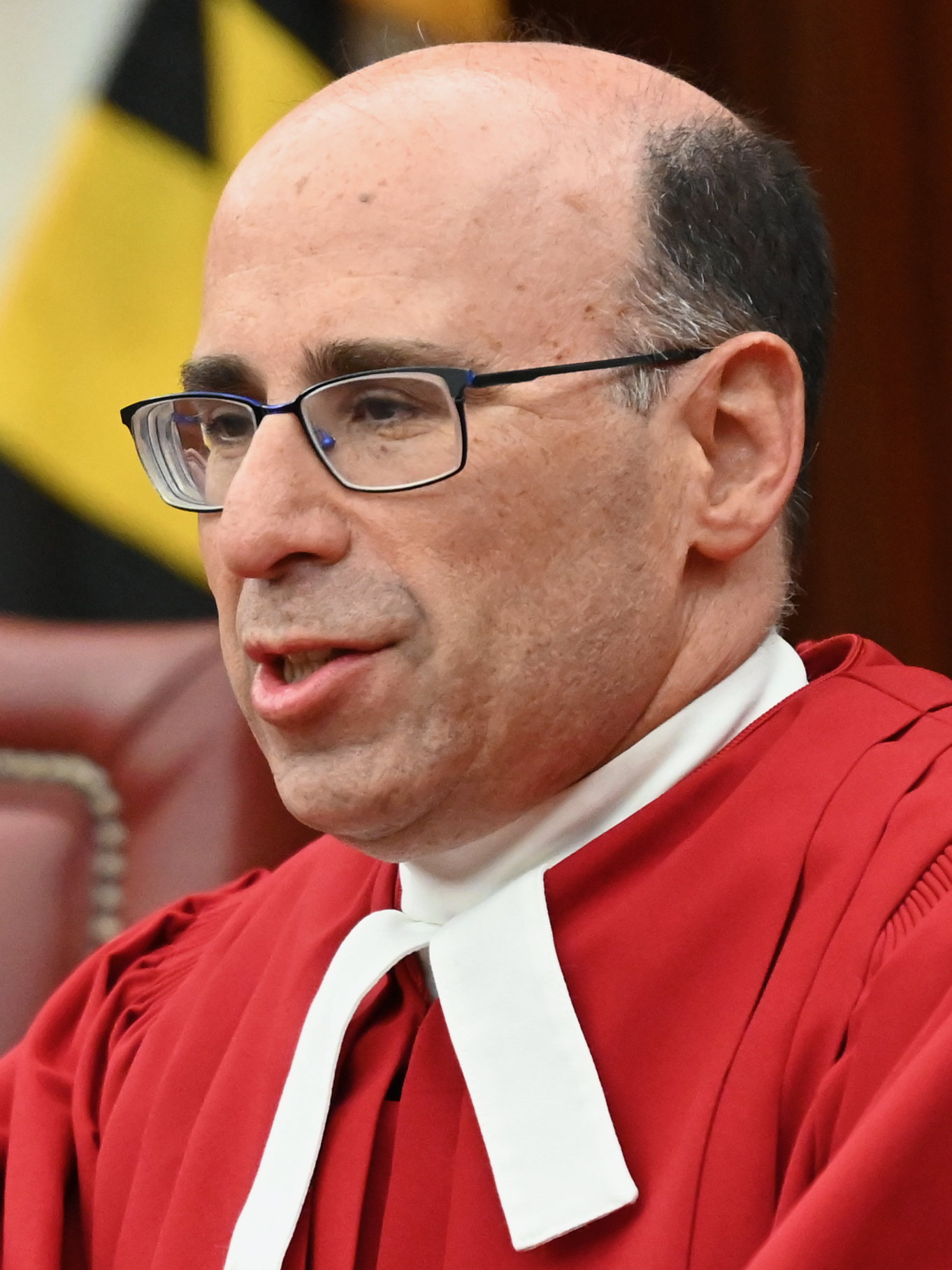

Justice of the Supreme Court of Maryland
- Incumbent
- Assumed office December 16, 2019
- Appointed by: Larry Hogan
- Preceded by: Clayton Greene Jr.

Personal details
- Born: 1966 (age 59–60) New York City, New York, U.S.
- Education: Swarthmore College (BA); Stanford University (JD)

Jonathan Biran (born 1966) is an American lawyer from Maryland who serves as a justice of the Supreme Court of Maryland.

== Early life and education ==
Biran was born in 1966 in New York City. He received his Bachelor of Arts from Swarthmore College and his Juris Doctor from Stanford Law School.

== Career ==
Biran served as a law clerk for Judge David F. Levi of the United States District Court for the Eastern District of California. From 1994 to 1995, he was an Associate with Skadden Arps. From 2000 to 2006, he served as an Assistant United States Attorney for the District of Connecticut and he also served as an Assistant United States Attorney from 2006 to 2013 under Rod Rosenstein in the District of Maryland working on fraud and public corruption matters, he served Chief of the Maryland U.S. Attorney's Office from 2010 to 2013. From 2013 to 2017, he was a Partner with Biran Kelly. Prior to his appointment to the court in 2019, he was a partner with Baker Donelson where he practiced both criminal defense and appellate law.

=== Appointment to the Supreme Court of Maryland ===
In September 2019, it was reported that Biran was one of ten lawyers who applied for a vacant seat on the Supreme Court of Maryland left by the retirement of Clayton Greene Jr. On December 9, 2019, Governor Larry Hogan announced his appointment of Biran to be a Justice of the Supreme Court of Maryland. He was sworn into office on December 16, 2019.

== Personal life ==
Jonathan and his wife, Sarah, married on May 27, 2001. The wedding was officiated by Judge David F. Levi.

Legal offices
Preceded by Clayton Greene Jr.	Justice of the Supreme Court of Maryland; 2019–present	Incumbent
