= Albert T. Blackwell Jr. =

American judge (1925–2022)

Albert Turner Blackwell Jr. (June 27, 1925 – November 15, 2022) was an American justice of the Maryland Court of Appeals from 1987 to 1990.

Blackwell was born in Levels, West Virginia. His father was an analytical chemist. Blackwell attended the University of Maryland and George Washington University Law School.

Blackwell served on the Circuit Court of Prince George's County from 1975 to 1987, when he was appointed to the court of appeals by Governor William Donald Schaefer. Blackwell retired in January, 1990, after just over two years of service, indicating that he wished to retire after forty years of legal work, and to give others the chance to experience serving on the high court.

Blackwell married Barbara Totman around 1946, and the couple were together for 70 years, until her death in 2016. Blackwell died on November 15, 2022, at the age of 97.

Political offices
Preceded by James F. Couch Jr.	Judge of the Maryland Court of Appeals; 1987–1990	Succeeded by Howard S. Chasanow
