= William Frick (judge) =

American judge (1790–1855)

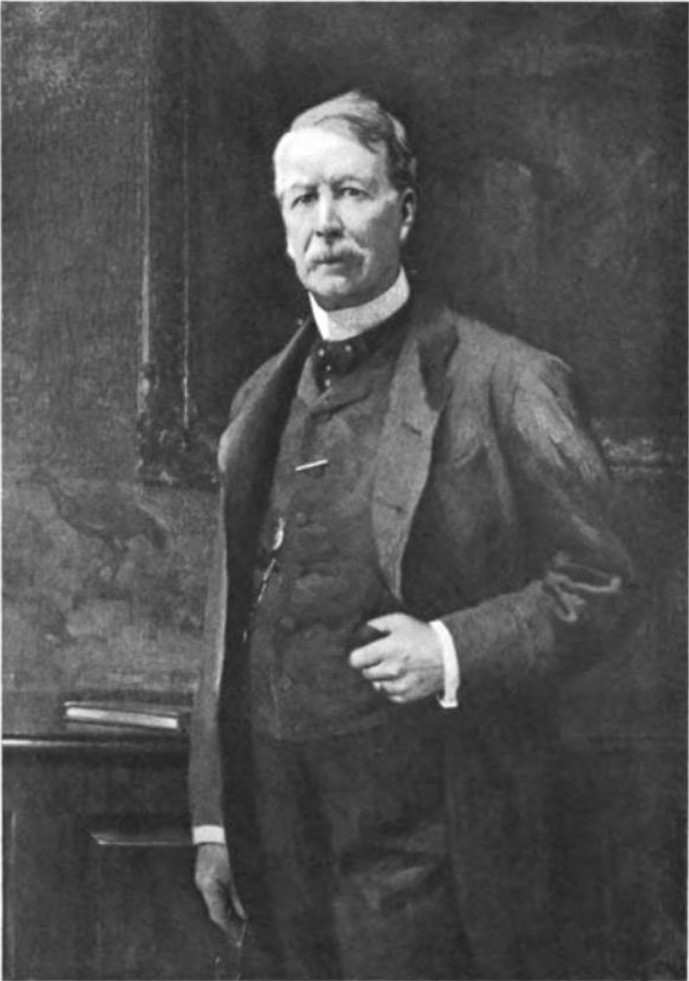

Judge of the Maryland Court of Appeals
- In office 1848–1851
- Preceded by: Stevenson Archer
- Succeeded by: Court reconfigured

Member of the Maryland Senate
- In office 1841–1846
- Preceded by: Benjamin C. Howard
- Succeeded by: Charles M. Keyser

Personal details
- Born: November 2, 1790 Baltimore, Maryland, U.S.
- Died: July 29, 1855 (aged 64) Warm Springs, Virginia, U.S.
- Spouse: Mary Sloan (m. 1816)
- Children: 8
- Relatives: Mary Frick Garrett Jacobs (granddaughter)
- Education: Moravian College
- Occupation: Lawyer; judge; politician

William Frick (November 2, 1790 – July 29, 1855) was a justice of the Maryland Court of Appeals from 1848 to 1851.

== Early life ==
William Frick was born on November 2, 1790, in Baltimore, Maryland, to Anna Barbara (née Breidenhart) and Peter Frick. Frick attended Moravian College in Nazareth, Pennsylvania. He served in the War of 1812 as a volunteer during the campaign in Maryland. Frick then read law in Baltimore in the law office of General William H. Winder, gaining admission to the bar in that city in 1813.

== Career ==
=== Legal and political career ===
His legal work was mainly in admiralty, maritime and insurance law. He was described as being "identified with almost every social and public enterprise of importance undertaken in the city". He was a presidential elector for Andrew Jackson in 1833, and in 1837, President Jackson appointed Frick collector of the Port of Baltimore. He was elected to the Maryland Senate, representing Baltimore City, from 1841 to 1846.

=== Judicial service ===
In June, 1848, Governor Francis Thomas appointed Frick as a judge of the Baltimore county courts and associate judge of the court of appeals, which offices he held until his election in 1851 as the first judge of the superior court of Baltimore City, where he remained until his death.

== Personal life and death ==
On June 16, 1816, Frick married Mary Sloan, with whom he had six sons and two daughters, William Frederick, Elizabeth A., Mary L., Charles, George P., Frank, James Sloan and William. He lived at 182 North Charles Street in Baltimore. He died on July 29, 1855, in Warm Springs, Virginia, after an illness of only a few days. His widow survived him until 1865.

Political offices
Preceded by Stevenson Archer	Judge of the Maryland Court of Appeals; 1848–1851	Succeeded by Court reconfigured
