= Marbury (surname) =

Marbury is a surname. Notable people with the surname include:

- Anne Marbury Hutchinson (1591–1643), American Puritan spiritual adviser
- Charles Clagett Marbury (1898–1991), Justice of the Maryland Court of Appeals
- Elisabeth Marbury (1856–1933), American theatrical and literary agent and producer
- Francis Marbury (1555–1611), English cleric, schoolmaster, and playwright; father of Anne
- Ogle Marbury (1882–1973), American jurist, Chief Judge of the supreme court of Maryland
- Stephon Marbury (born 1977), American basketball player
- William Marbury (1762–1835), American businessman
  - Marbury v. Madison, a decision of the United States Supreme Court
- William L. Marbury Jr. (1901–1988), American lawyer
