= D. Lindley Sloan =

American judge (1874–1962)

Chief Judge of the Maryland Court of Appeals
- In office 1943–1944
- Preceded by: Carroll Bond
- Succeeded by: Ogle Marbury

Personal details
- Born: April 3, 1874 Pekin, Maryland, U.S.
- Died: May 13, 1962 (aged 88)
- Resting place: Frostburg Memorial Park Cemetery; Frostburg, Maryland, U.S.
- Party: Republican
- Spouse: Marian DeWitt (m. 1917)
- Children: 1
- Education: Washington & Jefferson College

Duncan Lindley Sloan (April 3, 1874 – May 13, 1962) was an American jurist who served as chief judge of the supreme court of the U.S. state of Maryland, the Court of Appeals.

== Early life ==
D. Lindley Sloan was born on April 3, 1874, in Pekin, Allegany County, Maryland to James M. Sloan and Ella Frederick Sloan. He received his early education from the public schools of Lonaconing. In 1892, he graduated from Washington & Jefferson College, and proceeded to study law with his cousin David W. Sloan in Cumberland, Maryland. He was admitted to the Maryland Bar in 1895.

After being admitted to the Bar, Sloan entered into private law practice in Cumberland, where he worked from 1895 to 1926. He also served as the City Attorney of Cumberland from 1910 to 1914. In 1926, he was elected as a chief judge of the Allegany County Circuit Court and as an associate judge of the Maryland Court of Appeals. He was promoted to chief judge of the Court of Appeals in 1943, where he served until 1944. He was a Republican.

Sloan also served as President of the Maryland Bar Association in 1932, and as vice-chair of the State War Ballot Commission from 1950 until his death in 1962.

== Personal life ==
Sloan married Marian DeWitt on February 22, 1917, with whom he had one son, James DeWitt.

Sloan died on May 13, 1962. He was buried at Frostburg Memorial Park Cemetery.

Legal offices
Preceded by Carroll Bond	Chief Judge of the Maryland Court of Appeals; 1943–1944	Succeeded by Ogle Marbury
