= Mt. Hebron High School =

Public high school in Ellicott City, Maryland, U.S.

Coordinates: 39.2992°N 76.8404°W

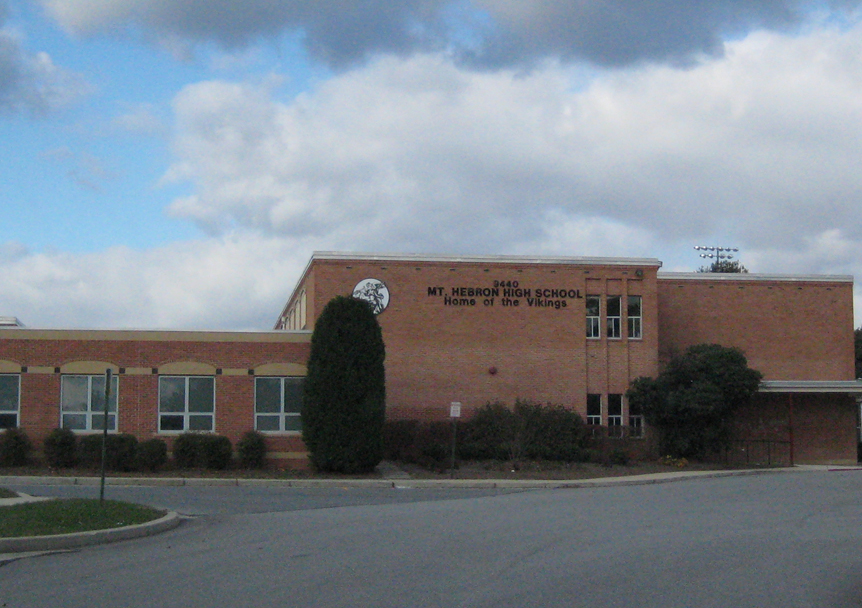
- 9440 Route 99; Ellicott City, MD 21042; United States

Information
- Type: Public high school
- Motto: Home of the Vikings
- Established: 1965
- School district: Howard County Public School System
- Superintendent: William J. Barnes
- Principal: Katie Clark
- Faculty: 104.00 (on an FTE basis)
- Enrollment: 1639 (2021–22)
- Student to teacher ratio: 15,76
- Colors: Black and Gold
- Athletics conference: MPSSAA 3A
- Mascot: Viking
- Rivals: Marriotts Ridge High School, Centennial High School
- Newspaper: The Mountain
- Website: mhhs.hcpss.org

Mt. Hebron High School is a public high school located in Ellicott City, Maryland United States. It is part of the Howard County Public School System.

== About the school ==
Mt. Hebron opened in 1965 as a junior high school. When Patapsco Middle School opened nearby in 1969, Mt. Hebron was converted into a high school. Mt. Hebron was ranked 671st in Newsweek magazine's "America's Best High Schools" listing in 2006 and was ranked 598th in 2007. It has a 92.4% graduation rate and its latest renovations were completed in 2011.

Mt. Hebron High School is named after the nearby 21,252 acre slave plantation and manor. Mt. Hebron is a stone home built by Col John Worthington Dorsey for his son Thomas Beale Dorsey in 1808.

== Geography ==
Mt. Hebron High School is located in suburban Howard County, approximately 10 miles west of Baltimore in Ellicott City. It is at the intersection of St. Johns Lane and Route 99, Old Frederick Road, just west of U.S. 29 and north of I-70.

== Athletics ==
On November 19, 2021 the Mt. Hebron Girls Soccer team won its first State Championship in program history against county rival River Hill 1-0 at Loyola University. Head Coach Tim Deppen went on to be voted All-Metro Coach of the Year by the Baltimore Sun. The Mt. Hebron boys' soccer team won back-to-back 2A state championships in 1999 and 2000, and the 3A championship in 2006.

The boys' cross country team won the Class C Maryland State Championship in 1969 and the 2A championship in 2008.

The volleyball team won the 2A state championship three years running (1990, 1991, and 1992) and the 3A championship in 1995.

Between 1992 and 2007 the girls' lacrosse team won the state championship every year except 1996, winning 2A in 1992 and 1993; 4A in 1994, 1995, and 1997; 2A in 1998 and 1999; and 3A in 2000, 2001, 2002, 2003, 2004, 2005, 2006, and 2007. The boys' team won the 2A championship in 1991 and 1999 and the 3A championship in 2002 and 2006.

The boys' track and field team won the 3A state championship in 2013.

The girls' basketball team won the C state championship in 1980; the B championship in 1986, 1987, and 1988; and the 2A championship in 1990, 1991, and 2008. The boys' team won the B championship in 1984.

The lancer drill/dance team won the Division 1 Maryland state champions in the high kick division at the MAPDA competition in 2009. The dance team has also received first place in the National Music Festival competition with superior ratings every year since 2005. In 2012, the lancer drill/dance team won the state championship MAPDA Competition in Division 1 Short Pom, High Kick and Total Package categories.

The wrestling, led by a strong senior class, placed first in the 3A Regional Duals and placed second in the state in 2018.

The Swim Club has placed first at every county swim meet since 2013.

== Academics ==
Mt. Hebron's National Economics Challenge team won the Maryland state championship in 2010, 2011, 2014, 2017, 2019. The 2010 and 2011 teams went on to the national semi-final competition and the 2010 team competed in the national finals in Manhattan. The 2018-19 team went on to win at Nationals later that year.

Mt. Hebron's local FBLA Chapter became the region 5 champion in Maryland, and had a member place 4th nationally for the economics test. Most recently they won the region 5 and state championship.

The Hebron It's Academic Team placed in the Maryland State Finals for the first time in its history.

== Notable alumni ==
- Lindsey Jordan of Snail Mail
- Aaron Maybin - football player with the Toronto Argonauts
- Xavier Proctor - football player
- Cathy Reese - Head Coach of Woman's Lacrosse at the University of Maryland
- Sandra Stosz - retired U.S. Coast Guard Vice-Admiral and former Superintendent of the U.S. Coast Guard Academy

== Racism incident and protest ==
In February 2016, a student attending the school published a racist video to the internet, in which he ranted against the Black Lives Matter movement, saying "who the (expletive) cares about some black man who dies? They're an inferior race, OK?" He also claimed that Abraham Lincoln was "a traitor to the white race." In response to this, about 150 students staged a protest to show their opposition to the racist attitudes expressed in the video.
