= Hall Hammond =

American judge

Chief Judge of the Maryland Court of Appeals
- In office 1966–1972
- Preceded by: Stedman Prescott
- Succeeded by: Robert C. Murphy

Attorney General of Maryland
- In office 1947–1952
- Governor: William Preston Lane Jr. Theodore McKeldin
- Preceded by: William Curran
- Succeeded by: Edward D. E. Rollins

Personal details
- Born: May 18, 1902 Baltimore, Maryland, U.S.
- Died: November 27, 1991 (aged 89)

Hall Hammond (May 18, 1902 – November 27, 1991) was an American jurist and politician who served as Chief Judge of the Court of Appeals and Attorney General for the state of Maryland.

Hammond was born in Baltimore, Maryland to William S. Hammond and Rosalie Hall Hammond. He received his early education from the Gilman School, the Jefferson School, and Baltimore City College. He received his A.B. degree from Johns Hopkins University in 1923, and his LL.B. degree in 1925 from the University of Maryland School of Law. He married Elizabeth Ashton Luck in 1934.

Hammond's early legal career was with the firm of Willis & Hudgins, whom he worked for from 1925 to 1929. He began his own practice in 1929, which he maintained until 1952. He served as Deputy Attorney General of Maryland from 1938 to 1946, and as Attorney General of Maryland from 1947 to 1952. He also served as Secretary of the Alcoholic Beverage Survey Commission from 1942 to 1943.

Hammond was confirmed as an associate judge of the Maryland Court of Appeals in 1952, and, in 1966, he was confirmed as chief judge of the court. While on the court, he petitioned the government to create the Maryland Court of Special Appeals to ease the workload of his court. He was also the first chief judge of the Court of Appeals to present to the Maryland General Assembly a "State of the Judiciary" address. Hammond retired from the court in 1972, and served as a member of the Board of Directors of the Children's Hospital School and South Baltimore General Hospital, amongst other things.

Legal offices
Preceded by Stedman Prescott	Chief Judge of the Maryland Court of Appeals; 1966–1972	Succeeded by Robert C. Murphy
