= Dale R. Cathell =

American judge

Judge of the Maryland Court of Appeals
- In office January 20, 1998 – July 30, 2007
- Succeeded by: Sally D. Adkins

Personal details
- Born: Dale Roberts Cathell; July 30, 1937 (age 89) Berlin, Maryland, U.S.
- Spouse: Charlotte Morgan Kerbin (m. 1974)
- Children: 3
- Education: Mount Vernon School of Law (LLB)

Dale Roberts Cathell (born July 30, 1937) is an American lawyer and jurist who from 1998 to 2007 was a judge on the Maryland Court of Appeals.

== Early life ==
Dale Roberts Cathell was born on July 30, 1937, in Berlin, Maryland, to Charlotte Robert (née Hocker) Terrell and Dale Parsons Cathell. He attended Stephen Decatur High School.

He served in the United States Air Force from 1955 to 1959. He then attended the University of Maryland, College Park from 1962 to 1964. He earned a LL.B. from the Mt. Vernon School of Law (now part of the University of Baltimore) in 1967 and was admitted to the Maryland bar in the same year.

== Career ==
Cathell served as a partner of Cathell & Ewell from 1970 to 1980. He served as an associate judge of the District Court of Maryland, District 2 in Worcester County from 1980 to 1981. He then served as an associate judge from 1981 to 1982 and then an administrative judge of the Worcester County Circuit Court, 1st Judicial Court from 1982 to 1989.

In 1997, he was an adjutant professor at the University of Baltimore Law School. On January 20, 1998, he became a judge of the Maryland Court of Appeals. He retired on July 20, 2007, but sat on the bench until his replacement was appointed.

== Personal life ==
Cathell married Charlotte Morgan Kerbin of Snow Hill, Maryland in 1974. They had three children.

== Awards ==
- 2004 – Access to Justice Award, Women's Law Center of Maryland
