= William L. Henderson =

American judge

Chief Judge of the Maryland Court of Appeals
- In office 1964–1964
- Preceded by: Frederick Brune
- Succeeded by: Stedman Prescott

Personal details
- Born: December 8, 1894 Philadelphia, Pennsylvania, U.S.
- Died: March 23, 1984 (aged 89)

William L. Henderson (December 8, 1894 – March 23, 1984) was an American jurist who served as chief judge of the supreme court of the U.S. state of Maryland, the Court of Appeals.

== Biography ==
Henderson was born in Philadelphia, Pennsylvania to Charles English and Ida Mary Lynn Henderson, but was raised on the Eastern Shore of Maryland. He received his early education from the Gilman School, where he graduated from in 1911. He went on to the University of Virginia, receiving a B.A. degree from there in 1914, and then on to Harvard Law School, where he received his LL.B. degree in 1919.

During World War I, Henderson served in the United States Navy. He entered into private law practice in 1919 with the law firm of Stewart & Pearre, and then later with All, Henderson, & Freeman. He remained in private practice until 1931, when he was appointed Assistant Attorney General of Maryland, a position he served in until 1941. He later served as Chairman of the Maryland Tax Commission from 1941 to 1943.

From 1943 to 1944, Henderson served as a judge of the Supreme Bench of Baltimore City. He was appointed to the Maryland Court of Appeals in 1944. He remained in that position until 1964, when he briefly served as chief judge of the court.

After his tenure on the Court, he served as a delegate from Anne Arundel County to the Maryland Constitutional Convention of 1967.

Henderson married Vera Cameron Price Fitz Randolph on August 23, 1923, with whom he had one son, Richard Henderson.

Legal offices
Preceded by Frederick Brune	Chief Judge of the Maryland Court of Appeals; 1964–1964	Succeeded by Stedman Prescott
