= Hebron Baptist Church =

Church in Georgia, United States

Coordinates: 33.998244°N 83.909696°W

Hebron Baptist Church is a Baptist church in Dacula, Georgia. It is affiliated with the Southern Baptist Convention.

== History ==
Hebron began as a small town church in 1842. At the time, the congregation was no larger than a few families, as were most country churches. Hebron was rebuilt in the 1970s to accommodate the somewhat larger town. The church had several pastors before 1978 when Larry Wynn took up the post. In 1998, it founded the Hebron Christian Academy. In March 2006, the church dedicated a new 4000-seat Worship Center. In 2011, Kevin Miller accepted the call to serve as Senior Pastor. In 2017, Dr. Landon Dowden became the new senior pastor. In 2018, it claimed a membership of 8,000 people.
