= Charles Clagett Marbury =

American politician

Personal details
- Born: 1898 Beacon Hill Farm Upper Marlboro MD
- Died: July 19, 1991 Washington, D.C.
- Party: Democratic
- Spouse: Kathryn Worthington Lancaster

Charles Clagett Marbury (1898 – July 19, 1991) was an American politician and judge, who served as a justice of the Maryland Court of Appeals from 1960 to 1969.

Marbury was elected to the Maryland House of Delegates in 1931 and served until he was elected to the state Senate in 1941. He was a member of the Democratic Party. A short while later, he was appointed to serve as a Circuit Court judge, and later, to one of two newly created seats on the Court of Appeals.

He was born in Upper Marlboro, Maryland and attended the Emerson Preparatory School in Washington, D.C. and received a degree from the Johns Hopkins University in 1922. Part of his studies were conducted at the University of Bordeaux where he remained after serving in the field artillery of the 29th Division in World War I.

He studied law at the University of Maryland School of Law and eventually graduated from Georgetown University law school in 1925.

He was a member of Trinity Episcopal Church, the Society of the Cincinnati and the Southern Maryland Society, which awarded him its Distinguished Member Award in 1989.

He died on July 19, 1991.

Political offices
| Preceded by Newly established seat | Judge of the Maryland Court of Appeals; 1960–1969 | Succeeded by J. Dudley Digges |
