= Levin C. Bailey =

American judge (c. 1892–1952)

Levin Claude Bailey (c. 1892 – June 8, 1952) was a justice of the Maryland Court of Appeals from 1943 to 1944.

Born in Quantico, Maryland, Bailey attended St. John's College and received has law degree from the University of Maryland Law School in 1913. He served in the United States Army Reserve during World War I, achieving the rank of captain. Bailey served for various periods as Salisbury city solicitor and as a Wicomico County, Maryland, prosecutor. Bailey later entered private practice, forming the firm of Miles, Bailey, Williams & Clark, where he remained until 1943, when Governor Herbert O'Conor appointed Bailey chief judge of the state's First Judicial Circuit. Under Maryland Law at the time, this also made him a member of the state's high court. Bailey remained on the high court until 1944, when an amendment to the state constitution changed the composition of the court and removed appointed judges in favor of elected judges. Governor O'Conor then commissioned Bailey to continue as a judge of the circuit court, where Bailey thereafter remained until his death.

Bailey married Irma Aurelia Porter of Portsmouth, Virginia, with whom he had a son, James Porter. Bailey died unexpectedly from a heart attack at his home in Salisbury, Maryland, at the age of 60. Following his death, a portrait of Bailey was installed in the law library of the Wicomico County Circuit Court.

Political offices
Preceded by Benjamin A. Johnson	Judge of the Maryland Court of Appeals; 1943–1944	Succeeded by Court reconfigured
