= Glenn T. Harrell Jr. =

American judge

Glenn T. Harrell Jr. (born 1945) is an American lawyer and jurist from Upper Marlboro, Maryland. From 1999 to 2015, he served as a judge on the Maryland Court of Appeals, the highest court in the state.

Harrell attended the University of Maryland, earning a B.A. in 1967 and a J.D. in 1970 from the University of Maryland School of Law. He was admitted to the Maryland bar in 1970 and entered private practice. He was first made a judge in the Court of Special Appeals in 1991 and elevated to the highest court on September 10, 1999, to a seat vacated by the retirement of Justice Howard S. Chasanow.
