= Clayton Greene Jr. =

American judge

Judge of the Maryland Court of Appeals
- In office January 22, 2004 – June 30, 2019
- Appointed by: Robert Ehrlich
- Succeeded by: Jonathan Biran

Personal details
- Born: January 22, 1951 (age 75) Glen Burnie, Maryland, U.S.
- Education: University of Maryland, College Park (B.A.); University of Maryland, Baltimore (J.D.)

Clayton Greene Jr. (born January 22, 1951) is an American lawyer and former jurist from Annapolis, Maryland. He served as a judge on the Maryland Court of Appeals after being appointed by Governor Robert Ehrlich from January 22, 2004, until his retirement on June 30, 2019.

Clayton was born in Glen Burnie, Maryland and attended public schools including Northeast High School in nearby Pasadena. He attended the University of Maryland, College Park and earned a Bachelor of Arts degree in 1973 as well as a Juris Doctor from the University of Maryland School of Law in 1976. In 1977 he was admitted to the bar and became an Assistant Public Defender.

Greene was first appointed to a state bench in 1990 as Administrative Judge for Maryland's District 7 in Anne Arundel County. He was advanced to the Circuit Court in 1996 and to the state's supreme court in 2004.

== See also ==
- List of African-American jurists
