= Sally D. Adkins =

American judge (born 1950)

Judge of the Maryland Court of Appeals
- In office June 25, 2008 – October 31, 2018
- Appointed by: Martin O'Malley
- Preceded by: Dale R. Cathell

Personal details
- Born: Sally Denison Adkins; 1950 (age 75–76) Salisbury, Maryland, U.S.
- Spouse: William Jolliffe Bostian (m. 1977)
- Education: Lawrence University (BA); University of Maryland School of Law (JD)

Sally D. Adkins (born 1950) is a former judge of the Maryland Court of Appeals. She was appointed to the bench in 2008, after serving as a Judge of the Maryland Court of Special Appeals between 1998 and 2008. She is a graduate of the University of Maryland School of Law. She retired from the bench on October 31, 2018.

== Early life ==
Sally Denison Adkins was born in 1950 in Salisbury, Maryland, to Emily (née Schweppe) and E. Dale Adkins Jr. Her father was a partner of the firm Adkins, Potts & Smethurst and served as judge of the Circuit Court for Wicomico. She graduated from Kent School in Kent, Connecticut. She graduated with a Bachelor of Arts in philosophy from Lawrence University in 1972. She then received a Juris Doctor from the University of Maryland School of Law in 1975. She clerked for Marvin H. Smith in the Court of Appeals from 1975 to 1976, and then was admitted to the bar in Maryland in 1976.

== Personal life ==
Adkins married William Jolliffe Bostian in 1977.

== Career ==
After being admitted to the bar, she was an associate attorney at Adkins, Potts & Smethurst from 1976 to 1981. She then became a partner of the firm from 1982 to 1996. She was also the partner of Adkins & Allen, LLP from 1995 to 1996.

Adkins served as associate judge of the Wicomico County Circuit Court, 1st Judicial Circuit from August 23, 1996, to June 23, 1998. She then served as judge of the Court of Special Appeals, 1st Appellate Judicial Court from June 24, 1998, to June 25, 2008. Adkins was appointed as judge on the Maryland Court of Appeals, 1st Appellate Judicial Circuit on June 25, 2008, by Governor Martin O'Malley. She filled the vacancy left by the retirement of Dale R. Cathell. She then retired from the Court of Appeals on October 30, 2018.

She was a member of the Maryland State Bar Association and served as president of the Wicomico County Bar Association from 1991 to 1992. She served on the board of directors of E.S. Adkins & Co.

== Awards ==
- 1992 – Fellow of the Maryland Bar Foundation in 1992.
- 1999 – Rita C. Davidson Award, Women's Bar Association of Maryland
- 2000 – Dorothy Beatty Memorial Award, Women's Law Center of Maryland
