= Walter M. Digges =

American politician

Walter Mitchell Digges (February 17, 1877 – October 5, 1934) was an American lawyer, judge, and delegate in the Maryland General Assembly in Maryland, United States. He was a member of the Democratic Party, and served as a Justice of the state's high court, the Maryland Court of Appeals from 1923 to 1934.

== Biography ==
Digges was part of a prominent Maryland family. He was born on February 17, 1877, in Charles County, Maryland, to Dr. John T. Digges and his wife Catherine, née Mitchell. He studied at Charlotte Hall Military Academy, Maryland Agricultural College (a predecessor of the University of Maryland), and Maryland Law School, from which he graduated in 1902. He was admitted to the Maryland bar the same year.

Digges, a Democrat, beat Republican Sydney Mudd II in a close race to become a member of the Maryland House of Delegates and served from 1910 until 1912. In 1910, he tried to pass the Digges Amendment, which would have barred African Americans from voting. It was co-sponsored by William J. Frere, also from Charles County, in the Maryland Senate.

Digges had a law partnership with Walter Jenifer Mitchell until 1923, when Digges was appointed to the bench as a judge on the Maryland Court of Appeals. By 1933 he was Chief Judge of the 7th Judicial Circuit Court. He was president of the Maryland State Bar Association at the time of his death.

Digges was for some time a Naval Officer of Customs for the Department of Customs at the Port of Baltimore.

== Personal life ==
Digges married Mary Natalie Jenkins and they had four children: Eleanor Jenkins Digges, John Dudley Digges, Walter Mitchell Digges Jr., and Edward Simms Digges. He died on October 5, 1934, at his home in La Plata and was buried in the town after a service at the Christ Episcopal Church on October 18. His house, constructed for him in 1914-1915 and variously called "Chillum" and "Chilham", is of historic importance. Its name is derived from Chilham in England, from whence his ancestors came.
