= List of University of Maryland Francis King Carey School of Law alumni =

The University of Maryland Francis King Carey School of Law, named the University of Maryland School of Law until 2011, in Baltimore, Maryland, is one of the oldest law schools in the United States. Since its founding in 1824, its alumni have included prominent politicians, judges, and others.

== Politicians ==
=== Governors ===
The following former Maryland governors are alumni of UM Law:

- Austin Lane Crothers (1890), 46th governor of Maryland, 1908–1912
- Marvin Mandel (1942), 56th governor of Maryland, 1969–1979
- Theodore McKeldin (1925), 53rd governor of Maryland, 1951–1959
- Herbert O'Conor (1920), 51st governor of Maryland, 1939–1947; U.S. Senate, 1947–1953
- Martin O'Malley (1988), 61st governor of Maryland, 2007–2015; 47th mayor of Baltimore, 1999–2006, candidate for Democratic nominee for president of the United States, 2016
- Albert Ritchie (1898), 49th governor of Maryland, 1920–1935

=== U.S. senators ===
The following current and former U.S. senators are alumni of UM Law:

- Angela Alsobrooks (1996), U.S. senator from Maryland, 2025–present
- Daniel Brewster (1949), U.S. senator from Maryland, 1963–1969; U.S. congressman for Maryland's 2nd District, 1959–1963
- William Cabell Bruce (1882), U.S. senator from Maryland, 1923–1929
- Ben Cardin (1967), U.S. senator for Maryland, 2007–2025; U.S. congressman for United States House of Representatives, 1987–2006
- Charles Mathias (1949), U.S. senator from Maryland, 1969–1987
- George L. P. Radcliffe (1903), U.S. senator from Maryland, 1935–1947
- Joseph Tydings (1953), U.S. senator from Maryland, 1965–1971
- Millard Tydings (1913), U.S. senator from Maryland, 1927–1951

=== U.S. congressmen ===
The following current and former U.S. congressmen are alumni of UM Law:

- William Purington Cole Jr. (1912), U.S. congressman from Maryland's 2nd District, 1927–1929 and 1931–1942
- Elijah Cummings (1976), U.S. congressman for Maryland's 7th District, 1996–2020
- John Charles Linthicum (1890), U.S. congressman for Maryland's 4th District, 1911–1932
- Hugh Meade (1932), U.S. congressman for Maryland 2nd District, 1947–1949
- Hillary Scholten (2011), U.S. congresswoman for Michigan's 3rd Congressional District, 2023–present
- Eric Swalwell (2006), U.S. congressman for California's 15th Congressional District, 2013–2026

=== State senators ===
The following current and former state senators, primarily from the Maryland Senate, are alumni of UM Law:

- Newton D. R. Allen (died 1927), Maryland state senator
- Walter M. Baker (1960), former member of the Maryland Senate, 1979–2003
- F. Vernon Boozer (1964), former member of the Maryland Senate, 1981–1999
- Harry A. Cole, first African-American elected to the Maryland Senate, 1954–1958
- Tom Davis, member of the South Carolina Senate, 2008–present
- John D. C. Duncan Jr. (1884–1958), member of the Maryland Senate, 1935–1937; also member of the Maryland House of Delegates, 1920
- Bill Ferguson (2010), president of the Maryland Senate, 2020–present
- Lisa A. Gladden (1991), majority whip of the Maryland State Senate
- Allan H. Kittleman (1988), member of the Maryland Senate, 2004–2014; Howard County executive, 2014–2018
- David G. McIntosh Jr. (1877–1940), Maryland state delegate and state senator
- Mike Miller (1967), former president of the Maryland Senate, 1987–2020
- Stevenson A. Williams (1851–1932), member of the Maryland Senate

=== State delegates ===
The following current and former members of the Maryland House of Delegates are alumni of UM Law:

- Harry W. Archer Jr. (died 1910), member of the Maryland House of Delegates, 1888
- Charles B. Bosley (died 1959), member of the Maryland House of Delegates, 1914
- Edward H. Burke (1886–1955), member of the Maryland House of Delegates, 1920
- Andrew J. Burns Jr. (1960), former member of the Maryland House of Delegates 1966–1983
- Michael W. Burns (1983), former member of the Maryland House of Delegates
- Jon S. Cardin (2001), member of the Maryland House of Delegates
- Frank I. Duncan (1858–1946), member of the Maryland House of Delegates, 1888; and judge
- Michael U. Gisriel (1976), former member of the Maryland House of Delegates 1987–1991
- John Mays Little (died 1950), member of the Maryland House of Delegates, 1908
- Anthony McConkey (1990), member of Maryland House of Delegates, 2003–present
- John L. V. Murphy (1899), member of the Maryland House of Delegates
- Emil B. Pielke (1971), former member of Maryland House of Delegates, 2002–2003
- Mary Louise Preis (1983), former member of Maryland House of Delegates, 1991–1999
- Kenneth D. Schisler (1998), former member of Maryland House of Delegates, and chair of Maryland Public Service Commission
- John G. Trueschler (1991), former member of the Maryland House of Delegates, 2003–2007
- Osborne I. Yellott (1871–1922), state delegate and lawyer

=== Mayors ===
The following former mayors of Baltimore are alumni of UM Law:

- Thomas L.J. D'Alesandro III, former mayor of Baltimore
- Stephanie Rawlings-Blake (1995), former president of Baltimore City council; 49th mayor of Baltimore

== Judges ==
Some notable alumni of UM Law have been appointed as judges, particularly in the Maryland Court of Appeals and Special Appeals. A few have been appointed to the U.S. District Court for the District of Maryland or other federal courts. The following current and former judges graduated from UM Law:

- Sally D. Adkins (1975), judge, Maryland Court of Appeals (Maryland's highest court), 2008–present
- Mary Ellen Barbera (1984), chief judge, Maryland Court of Appeals (Maryland's highest court), 2009–2021
- John D. Bates, judge for the U.S. District Court for the District of Columbia, 2001–present
- Lynne A. Battaglia (1974), judge, Maryland Court of Appeals, 2001–2016
- Richard D. Bennett (1973), judge, U.S. District Court for the District of Maryland, 2003–present
- Alice Pollard Clark (1982), Howard County, Maryland district court, 1997–2010
- Andre M. Davis (1978), judge U.S. Court of Appeals for the Fourth Circuit 2009–2017; judge, U.S. District Court for the District of Maryland, 1995–2009; Baltimore city solicitor, 2017–2020
- Joseph M. Getty (1996), judge, Maryland Court of Appeals, 2016–
- Clayton Greene Jr. (1976), judge, Maryland Court of Appeals, 2004–present
- John R. Hargrove Sr., Judge, U.S. District Court for the District of Maryland
- Glenn T. Harrell Jr. (1970), judge, Maryland Court of Appeals, 1999–2015
- Bernard S. Meyer (1938), associate judge, New York Court of Appeals
- Joseph F. Murphy Jr. (1969), chief judge, Maryland Court of Special Appeals, 1996–2007; judge, Maryland Court of Appeals, 2008–2011
- Robert C. Murphy (1951), chief judge, Maryland Court of Appeals, 1972–1996
- William H. Murphy Sr., judge, lawyer, civil rights activist
- Julie Rubin (1995), judge, U.S. District Court for the District of Maryland, 2022–present
- George Levi Russell III (1991), judge, U.S. District Court for the District of Maryland, 2012–present
- Simon Sobeloff (1915), former chief judge, United States Court of Appeals for the Fourth Circuit; former solicitor general of the United States
- Julie Stevenson Solt, judge on the Circuit Court for Frederick County in Maryland
- Morris Ames Soper (1895), judge of the United States Court of Appeals for the Fourth Circuit
- Sean D. Wallace (1985), judge, United Nations Dispute Tribunal
- Alan M. Wilner (1962), judge, Maryland Court of Appeals, 1996–2007
- Brendan A. Hurson (2005), U.S. District Court for the District of Maryland

== Attorneys general ==
The following former attorneys general of Maryland and U.S. attorneys general are alumni of UM Law:

- Benjamin Civiletti (1961), attorney general of the United States (1979–1981)
- Edgar Allan Poe (1893), attorney general of Maryland

== Activists and civil rights lawyers ==
The following activists, trailblazers, and civil rights lawyers are alumni of UM Law:

- Juanita Jackson Mitchell, first African-American woman to graduate from the University of Maryland School of Law, civil rights activist and lawyer with the NAACP
- Donald Gaines Murray, first African-American to enter the University of Maryland School of Law since 1890 as a result of winning the landmark civil rights case Murray v. Pearson in 1935
- Rose Zetzer, first woman admitted to the Maryland State Bar Association

== Others ==
- Elijah Bond, inventor of the ouija board
- Edward A. Christmas (1929), Thoroughbred racehorse trainer
- Donald P. Dunbar (2003), U.S. Air Force general; adjutant general of Wisconsin
- Tara Jackson, acting Prince George's County executive (2024–present)
- A.B. "Buzzy" Krongard (1975), former executive director of the CIA
- James F. Matousek (1932), attorney and civil servant who served the City of Baltimore in various legal and administrative capacities
- Jamie McCourt (1978), owner of the Los Angeles Dodgers
- Peter Newsham (2000), chief of the Metropolitan Police Department of the District of Columbia
- Robert Houston Noble (1892), U.S. Army brigadier general
- Robert M. Parker Jr. (1973), founder and editor of The Wine Advocate
- Peter Rheinstein, former FDA official
- William P. Richardson (1895), co-founder and first dean of Brooklyn Law School
- William C. Schmeisser (1907), National Lacrosse Hall of Fame inductee
- Arnold M. Weiner (1957), principal in the Law Offices of Arnold M. Weiner; fellow of the American College of Trial Lawyers

== Fictional ==
- Ardelia Mapp, character in the novels The Silence of the Lambs and Hannibal by Thomas Harris, the film adaptation The Silence of the Lambs, portrayed by Kasi Lemmons, and the television series Clarice, portrayed by Devyn Tyler
