= Joseph F. Murphy Jr. =

American judge (1944–2022)

Honorable Joseph F. Murphy Jr.

Judge of the Supreme Court of Maryland
- In office 2007–2011
- Appointed by: Martin O'Malley
- Preceded by: Alan M. Wilner
- Succeeded by: Robert N. McDonald

Chief Judge of the Appellate Court of Maryland
- In office 1996–2007
- Appointed by: Parris Glendening

Judge of the Appellate Court of Maryland
- In office 1993–1996
- Appointed by: William Donald Schaefer
- Succeeded by: Roslyn Blake Bell

Associate Judge of the Baltimore County Circuit Court
- In office 1984–1993
- Appointed by: Harry R. Hughes

Personal details
- Born: January 9, 1944 Fitchburg, Massachusetts, U.S.
- Died: July 27, 2022 (aged 78) Timonium, Maryland, U.S.
- Education: Boston College; University of Maryland School of Law
- Committees: Board of Directors, Maryland Judicial Institute, 1985–93, 1995–2000; Chair, Court of Appeals Standing Committee on Rules of Practice and Procedure, 1996–2007; Member, Library Committee, State Law Library, 1997–2007; Maryland Alternative Dispute Resolution Commission, 1998–2001; Member, Judicial Cabinet, 2000–07 Judicial Council; Maryland Judicial Conference, 2000–07: Advisory Board, Maryland Mediation and Conflict Resolution Office, 2001–2022; Member, Ad Hoc Committee on Sentencing Alternatives, Re-Entry, and Best Practices, 2010–2022

Joseph F. Murphy Jr. (January 9, 1944 – July 28, 2022) was an American lawyer and jurist from Baltimore, Maryland. Between December 17, 2007, and September 30, 2011, he was a judge of the Maryland Court of Appeals, the highest court in Maryland. Prior to this appointment, Murphy served as the Chief Judge of the Court of Special Appeals, Maryland's intermediate court of appeals. He was also an instructor at the University of Maryland Francis King Carey School of Law.

== Background ==
Born in Fitchburg, Massachusetts on January 9, 1944, Murphy attended St. Bernard's High School, Fitchburg; Boston College, A.B., 1965; and University of Maryland School of Law, J.D., 1969. He was admitted to the Maryland Bar in 1969. Murphy practiced law as a staff attorney for Legal Aid then as an Assistant State's Attorney, Baltimore City from 1970 to 1975, then as Deputy State's Attorney for Baltimore City from 1975 to 1976. After leaving the office of the State's attorney, he was a named partner at the Towson law firm of White & Murphy.

== Judicial career ==
- Associate Judge, Baltimore County Circuit Court, 3rd Judicial Circuit, 1984–93.
- Judge, Court of Special Appeals, (at-large) July 25, 1993 – 1996
- Chief Judge, Court of Special Appeals, 1996 – December 17, 2007
- Judge, Court of Appeals, (2nd Appellate Circuit (Baltimore & Harford counties)), December 17, 2007 – September 30, 2011.

Upon his retirement from the bench, Judge Murphy joined the Baltimore-based law firm of Silverman, Thompson, Slutkin & White, where he served as litigation support, and headed the firm's Alternative Dispute Resolution practice. Judge Murphy's daughter is currently an attorney in the firm's appellate litigation division. On December 22, 2011, Maryland Governor Martin O'Malley announced his appointment of Robert N. ("Bob") McDonald, the Chief Counsel of Opinions and Advice for the Office of the Attorney General of Maryland, to the Court of Appeals replacing Judge Murphy.

Judge Murphy died on July 27, 2022, at the age of 78 after suffering from cancer.

== Awards ==
- 2004 Man of All Seasons Award, St. Thomas More Society of Maryland
- 2003 Maryland Top Leadership in Law Award, Daily Record
- 2003 Maryland Champion for Victims Award, Maryland Crime Victims' Resource Center

Maryland Court of Appeals Judges by Seniority
Circuit	Name
6	Chief Judge Robert M. Bell
4	Judge Glenn T. Harrell Jr.
3	Judge Lynne A. Battaglia
5	Judge Clayton Greene Jr.
2	Judge Joseph F. Murphy Jr.
1	Judge Sally D. Adkins
7	Judge Mary Ellen Barbera
