= Government of Maryland =

State government of the United States

- Maryland state logo Great Seal of the State of Maryland
- Polity type: Sub-national administrative division (federated state)
- Part of: United States of America
- Constitution: Constitution of Maryland

Legislative branch
- Name: General Assembly
- Type: Bicameral
- Meeting place: Maryland State House
- Upper house
- Name: Senate
- Presiding officer: Bill Ferguson, President
- Lower house
- Name: House of Delegates
- Presiding officer: Joseline Peña-Melnyk, Speaker

Executive branch
- Head of state and government
- Title: Governor
- Currently: Wes Moore
- Appointer: Election
- Cabinet
- Name: Maryland executive council
- Leader: Governor
- Deputy leader: Lieutenant Governor
- Headquarters: State House

Judicial branch
- Name: Judiciary of Maryland
- Courts: Courts of Maryland
- Supreme Court of Maryland
- Chief judge: Matthew J. Fader
- Seat: Annapolis

The government of Maryland is conducted according to the Maryland Constitution. The United States is a federation; consequently, the government of Maryland, like the other 49 state governments, has exclusive authority over matters that lie entirely within the state's borders, except as limited by the Constitution of the United States.

Administrative influence in Maryland is divided among three branches of government: executive, legislative, and judicial. Unlike most other states, significant autonomy is granted to many of Maryland's counties.

Most of the business of government is done in Annapolis, the state capital. However, some cabinet level and state officials have their offices in Baltimore. Almost all state and county elections are held in even-numbered years not divisible by four, in which the President of the United States is not elected—this, as in other states, is intended to divide state and federal politics.

The Flag of Maryland

== Executive branch ==
The constitution establishes five principal executive branch officers, as described below. Four of them are elected statewide: the governor and lieutenant governor (who are elected on the same ticket), the attorney general, and the comptroller. The fifth, the treasurer, is elected by a joint ballot of both houses of the General Assembly.

Elected Executive Officials in Maryland
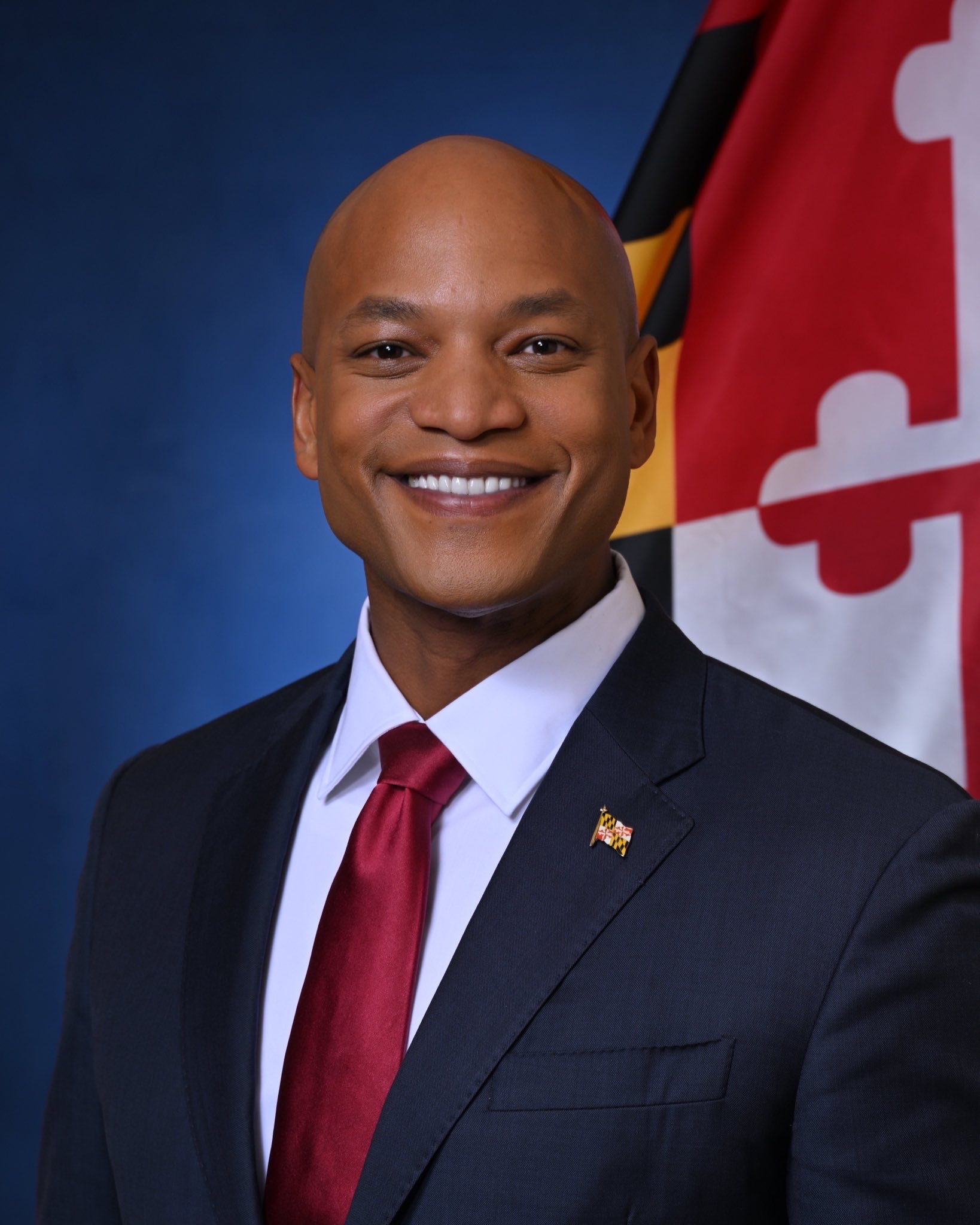
Wes Moore (D)
Governor

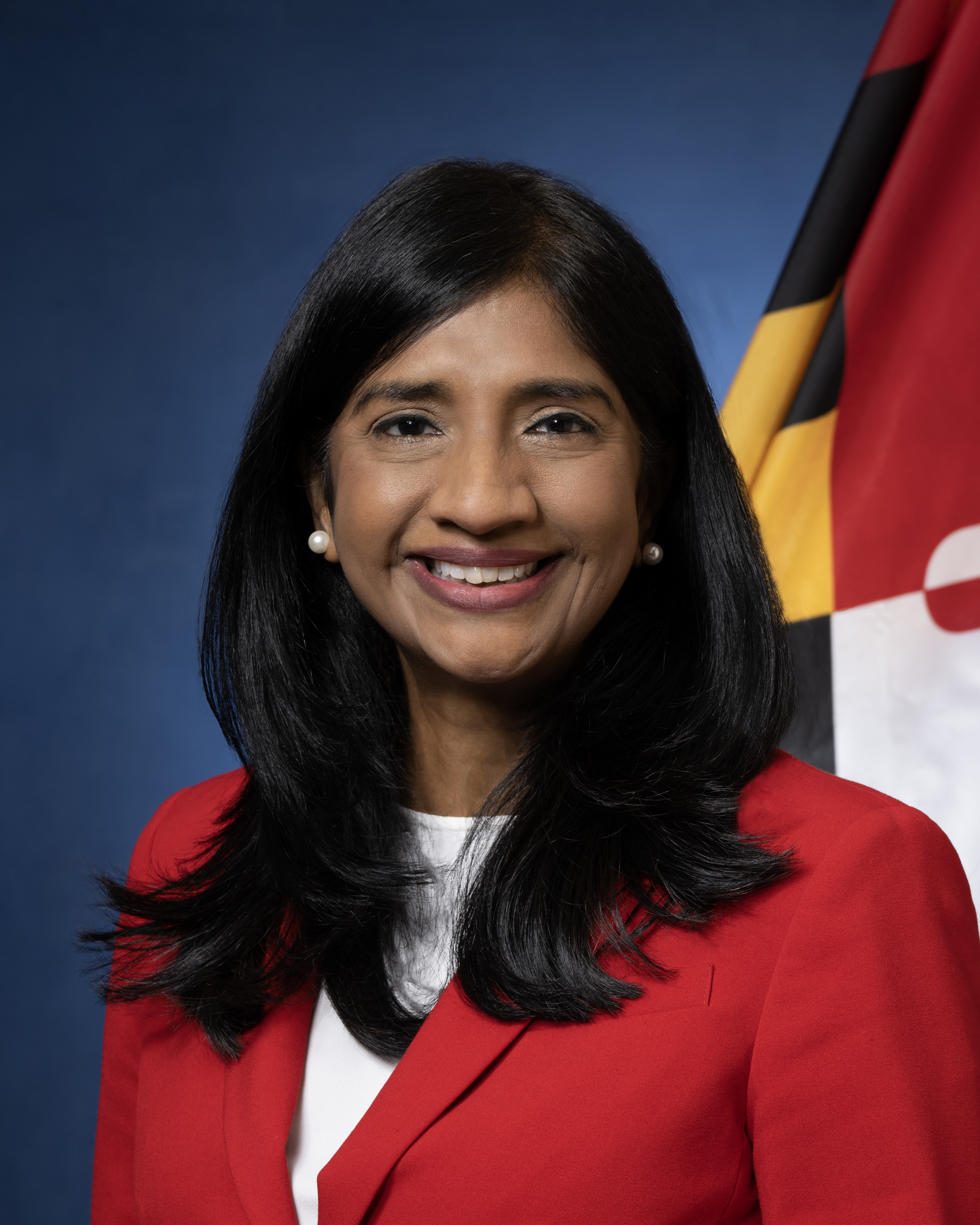
Aruna Miller (D)
Lieutenant Governor

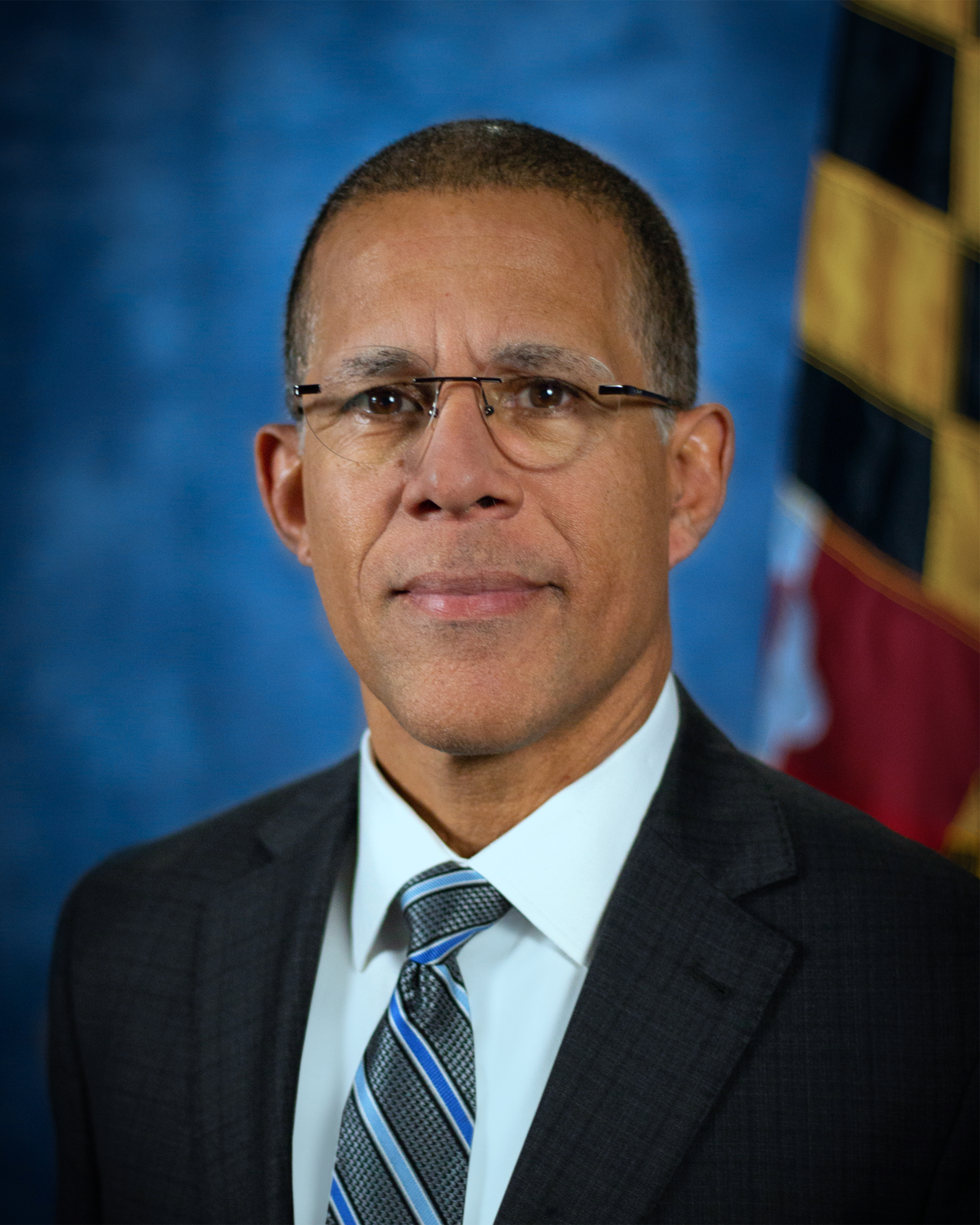
Anthony G. Brown (D)
Attorney General

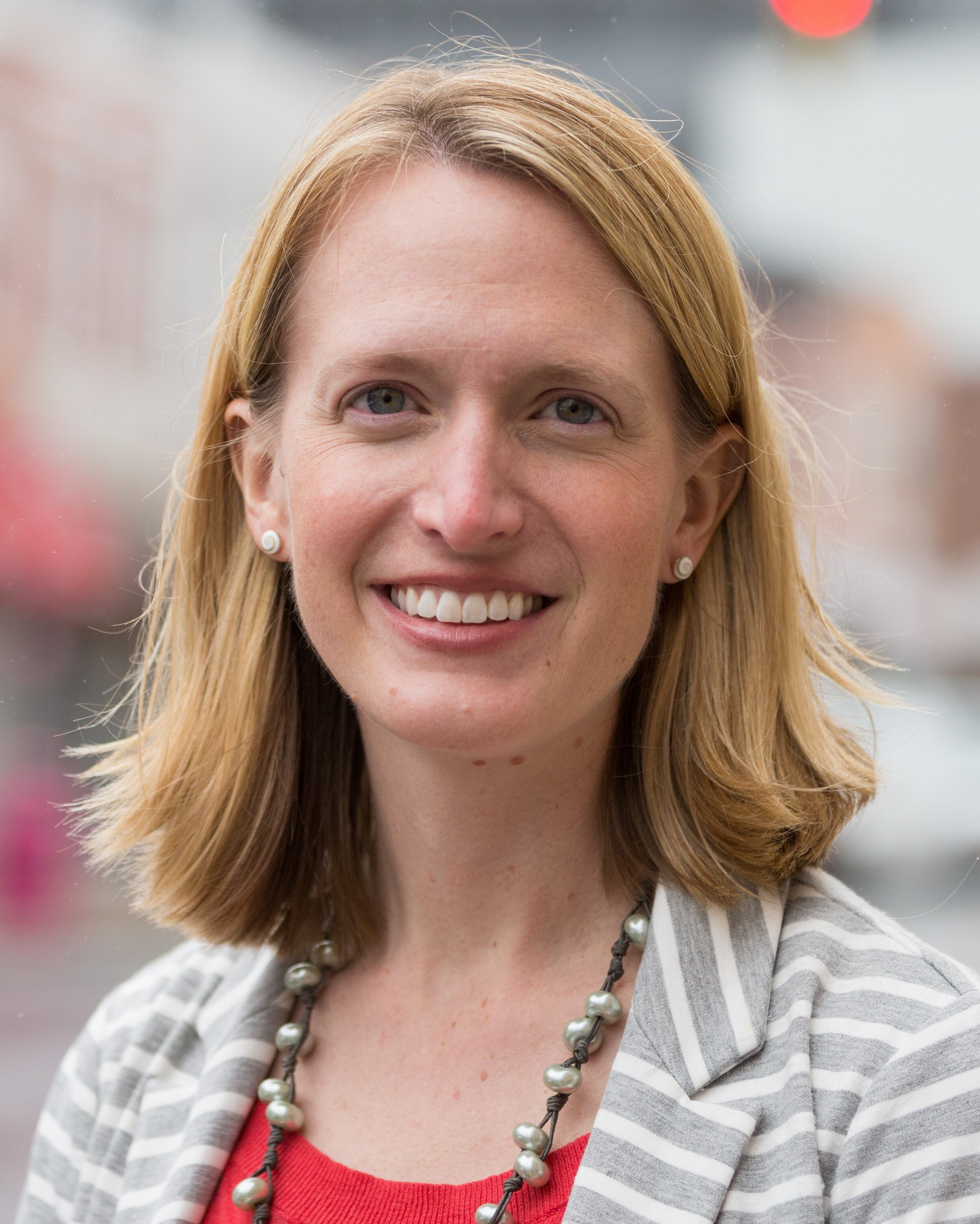
Brooke Lierman (D)
Comptroller

=== Governor ===
As in all states, a popularly elected governor heads Maryland's executive branch. The governor's cabinet is known as the Executive Council. Like most state chief executives, the Maryland governor is elected to serve a four-year term. The governor is term limited to serve no more than two consecutive terms. The governor is elected under the plurality system. The current governor is Wes Moore.

The governor has power to veto laws passed by the state's legislature and, like most of the nation's governors, also has a line item veto, which can be used to strike certain portions of appropriations bills. The state legislature can override a veto by a three-fifths (60%) vote of the total number of members in each house. This is different from most states, which usually require a higher two-thirds (66.66%) vote to override a veto.

The appointment powers of the governor are extensive. The governor appoints almost all military and civil officers of the State subject to the advice and consent of the Senate. In addition to appointing the heads of major departments, boards, and commissions of the State government, the governor appoints certain boards and commissions in each county and the City of Baltimore, as provided for by law. The governor also commissions notaries public and appoints persons to fill vacancies in the offices of Attorney General and Comptroller (both of which are normally elected by the people) and also to fill vacant seats in the General Assembly. The governor can remove any appointed officer (except interim members of the General Assembly) for cause.

The governor is commander-in-chief of the military forces of the State, the Maryland National Guard, except when such forces are called into the national service by the President of the United States, as well as the Maryland Defense Force. In times of public emergency the Governor has certain emergency powers as defined by law.

=== Lieutenant governor ===
The Maryland Lieutenant Governor is elected on the same ticket as the state's Governor and is nominally the second highest-ranking official in the state. The position was first created by the short-lived Maryland Constitution of 1864 and functioned from 1865 to 1868 before being abolished by the state's present constitution, which was ratified in 1867. The position was re-established by Constitutional amendment in 1970, under which the Lieutenant Governor "shall have only the duties delegated to him by the Governor."

The Maryland Lieutenant Governor, currently Aruna Miller, is therefore weaker than the office in most other states which have one (several states do not have one). For instance, in many states, including Texas, the Lieutenant Governor is the President of the State's Senate and in California the Lieutenant Governor assumes all of the governor's powers when the governor is out of the state. In both of those states, as in some others, the Lieutenant Governor is elected in his or her own right, independently of the state's Governor.

In practice, Maryland's Lieutenant Governor attends cabinet meetings, chairs various task forces and commissions, represents the state at ceremonial functions and at events which the Governor cannot attend, and advises the Governor. If there is a vacancy in the office of the Governor, the Lieutenant Governor becomes the Governor. A vacancy in the Lieutenant Governorship is filled by a person nominated by the Governor and confirmed by a majority vote of the General Assembly voting in joint session.

=== Attorney General ===
The Attorney General is the chief legal officer of the State and is elected by the people every four years with no term limits. To run for the office a person must be a citizen of and qualified voter in Maryland and must have resided and practiced law in the state for at least ten years. The current attorney general is Anthony G. Brown.

The Attorney General has general charge, supervision and direction of the legal business of the State. The attorney general is the legal advisor and representative of the Governor, the General Assembly, the Judiciary, and the major departments, various boards, commissions, officials and institutions of State Government. The office represents the State in all cases pending in the Appellate Courts of the State, and in the United States Supreme Court and lower Federal Courts. This arrangement can lead to significant conflict when the Attorney General and Governor have strongly differing views.

=== Comptroller ===
The Comptroller is the state's chief financial officer and is also elected by the people for a four-year term. The comptroller is not term-limited. The office was established by the Maryland Constitution of 1851 due to concern about the potential for fraud and corruption in the administration of the public treasury. The constitutional duties of the office begin with the broad mandate to exercise "general superintendence of the fiscal affairs of the State", which includes collecting taxes and maintaining the general ledger. The Comptroller (or a deputy) countersigns all checks drawn by the State Treasurer upon the deposits of the State. The Comptroller also prescribes the formalities for transfer of other evidence of State debt and countersigns such papers. The current comptroller is Brooke Lierman.

In addition, the comptroller's office audits taxpayers for compliance, handles delinquent tax collection, and enforces license and unclaimed property laws. The agency publicizes forgotten bank accounts, insurance benefits and other unclaimed assets of taxpayers. Acting as Maryland's chief accountant, the comptroller pays the state's bills, maintains its books, prepares financial reports, and pays state employees.

=== Treasurer ===
The Treasurer, currently Dereck E. Davis, is the principal custodian of the State's cash deposits, money from bond sales, and other securities and collateral and directs the investments of those assets. The Treasurer is elected by a joint ballot of both houses of the General Assembly, a tradition begun starting with the Maryland Constitution of 1851, which also created the Board of Public Works (see below).

Because of the close relationship with the General Assembly, the Treasurer briefs the members of the Legislature on matters concerning the State Treasury. The Treasurer is also responsible for producing an annual report to provide the Governor, the General Assembly, and the public with current information about the operations of the State Treasurer's Office.

=== Board of Public Works ===
The State Board of Public Works was first created by the Maryland Constitution of 1864 and is composed of the Governor, who chairs it, the Comptroller, and the Treasurer. The three-member board is quite powerful and there is no other state that has a similar institution. The board, which generally meets twice a month, reviews and approves capital projects, procurement contracts, and the acquisition, use, and transfer of State assets, to assure that executive decisions are made responsibly and responsively.

=== Other ===
- The Maryland Department of Agriculture (MDA) oversees food safety, consumer protection, farmering, food and fiber processing, and other businesses engaged in agricultural related operations.
- The Maryland State Department of Education (MSDE) oversees public school districts.
- The Maryland Department of the Environment (MDE) is the environmental protection agency.
- The Maryland Department of General Services (DGS) manages, operates, and maintains state property and acts as a primary procurement agency.
- The Maryland Department of Health oversees and regulates health-related issues.
- The Maryland Department of Housing and Community Development (DHCD) oversees housing policy.
- The Maryland Department of Labor oversees unemployment insurance, occupational and professional licensing, labor regulation, workforce training, financial regulation, and the Maryland Racing Commission.
- The Maryland Department of Natural Resources (DNR) maintains natural resources such as state parks, public lands, state forests, state waterways, wildlife and recreation areas.
- The Maryland Department of Transportation (MDOT) oversees the Maryland Transportation Authority, Maryland Transit Administration, Maryland Port Administration, State Highway Administration, Maryland Motor Vehicle Administration, and Maryland Aviation Administration.
- The Maryland State Archives serves as the central depository for government records of permanent value.
- The Maryland Energy Administration (MEA) administers the state's renewable energy grant and incentive programs, advises state officials on energy issues, and enforces appliance efficiency regulations.

== Legislative branch ==
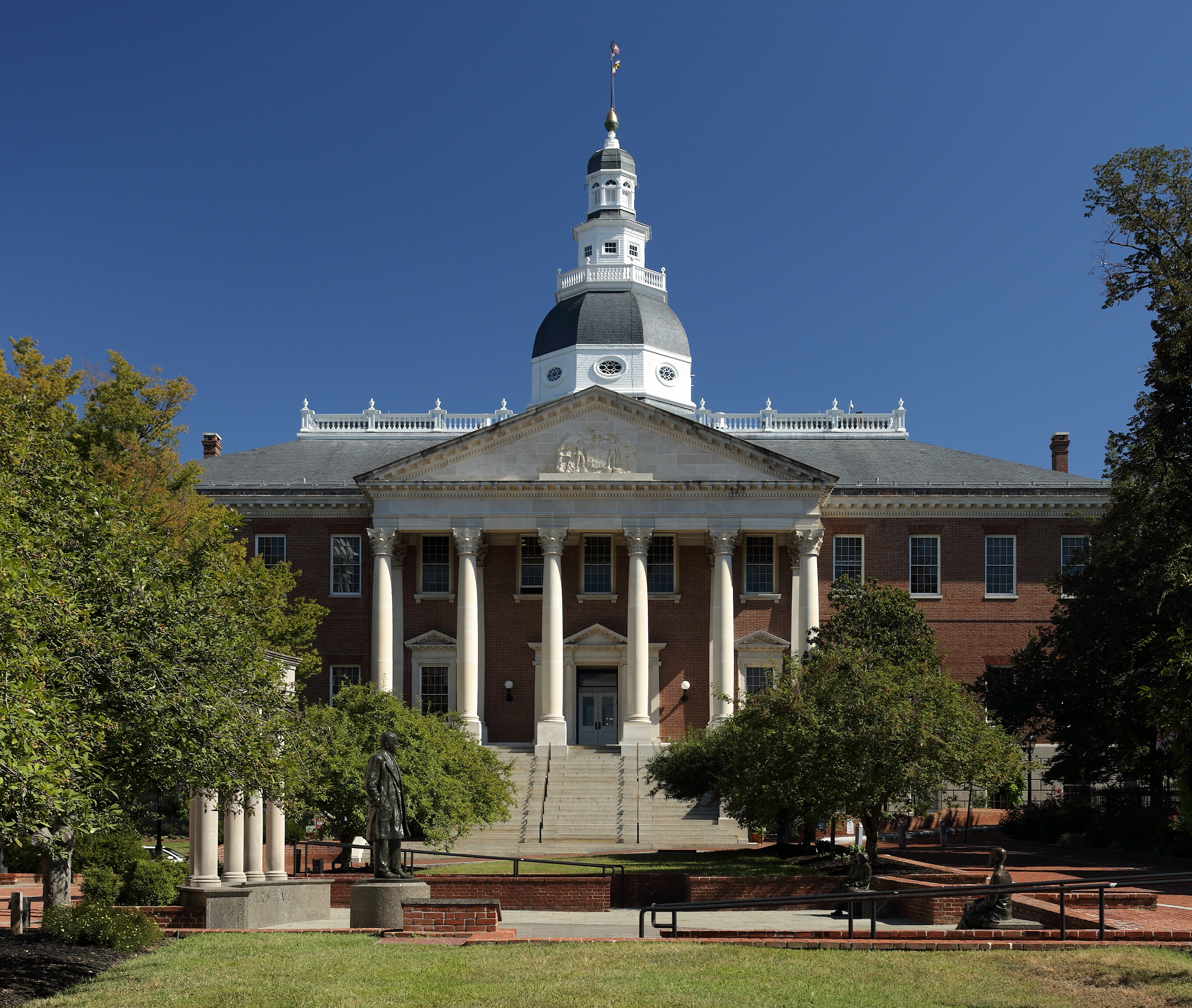
Maryland State House as seen from College Ave.

The state's legislative branch is styled as the General Assembly and consists of a 47-member Senate and a 141-member House of Delegates. It meets each year for 90 days to act on more than 2300 bills including the State's annual budget. Like the governor, members of both houses serve four-year terms. Each house elects its own officers, judges the qualifications and election of its own members, establishes rules for the conduct of its business, and may punish or expel its own members.

The current pattern for distribution of seats began with the legislative apportionment plan of 1972 and has been revised every ten years thereafter according to the results of the decennial U.S. census. A Constitutional amendment, the plan created 47 legislative districts, many of which cross county boundaries to delineate districts relatively equal in population. Each legislative district elects one senator and three delegates. Some of the larger districts are divided into delegate subdistricts to provide local representation to areas not large enough to constitute an entire legislative district.

The Senate is led by a President and the House by a Speaker whose respective duties and prerogatives enable them to influence the legislative process significantly. The President and the Speaker appoint the members of most committees and name their chairs and vice-chairs, except in the case of the Joint Committee on Investigation whose members elect their own officers. The President and Speaker preside over the daily sessions of their respective chambers, maintaining decorum and deciding points of order. As legislation is introduced, they assign it to a standing committee for consideration and a public hearing.

== Judicial branch ==
=== Supreme Court ===
The Supreme Court of Maryland is the highest court in the state. In addition to being the court of last resort for the state, the Supreme Court also administers and sets rules and guidelines for the state's court system. It has original jurisdiction in only a few areas and hears most cases on appeal. Prior to 2022, the Supreme Court was named the Court of Appeals, but a 2022 constitutional amendment changed the title to its current name. The court has seven judges, one from each of the state's seven appellate judicial circuits, which are presently as follows:

- 1st Appellate Judicial Circuit: Caroline, Cecil, Dorchester, Kent, Queen Anne's, Somerset, Talbot, Wicomico & Worcester counties
- 2nd Appellate Judicial Circuit: Baltimore County & Harford County
- 3rd Appellate Judicial Circuit: Allegany, Carroll, Frederick, Garrett, Howard & Washington counties
- 4th Appellate Judicial Circuit: Prince George's County
- 5th Appellate Judicial Circuit: Anne Arundel, Calvert, Charles & St. Mary's counties
- 6th Appellate Judicial Circuit: Baltimore
- 7th Appellate Judicial Circuit: Montgomery County

=== Appellate Court ===
To ease the caseload of the Supreme Court, the state's second-highest court, the Appellate Court was created in 1966, following a constitutional amendment. Except as otherwise provided by law, the Appellate Court has exclusive initial appellate jurisdiction over any reviewable judgment, decree, order, or other action of a circuit court or an orphans' court, except for appeals in criminal cases in which the death penalty is imposed. Generally, it hears cases appealed from the circuit courts. Prior to 2022, the Appellate Court was named the Court of Special Appeals, but a 2022 constitutional amendment changed the title to its current name.

Judges of the Appellate Court are empowered to sit in panels of three. A hearing or rehearing of a case en banc, in which all of the Court's judges sit, may be ordered in any case by a majority of the Court's incumbent judges. The court has thirteen judges, one from each of the state's seven judicial appellate circuits and six at-large judges.

Judges on both the Supreme Court and the Appellate Court are appointed by the Governor, with the consent of the Senate and the approval of the people, for 10 years. This system is similar to the Missouri Plan, which is used in 11 states to fill judicial appointments, in that voters get to decide whether or not to continue a judge in office. However, it is different in that the Governor's choice in whom to appoint is not limited by a Judicial Selection Commission and the State Senate must confirm the nominee before the judge takes office.

=== Circuit Courts ===
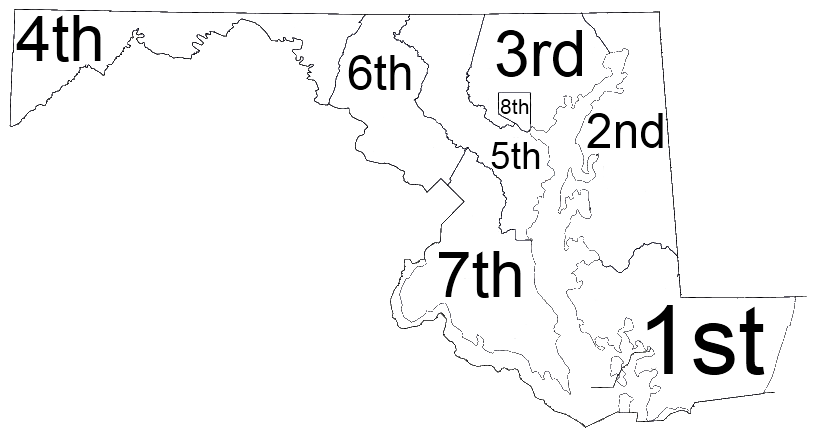
Judicial circuit map

Circuit Courts are the highest common law and equity courts of record exercising original jurisdiction within Maryland. Each has full common law and equity powers and jurisdiction in all civil and criminal cases within its county or counties, and all the additional powers and jurisdiction conferred by the Maryland Constitution and by law, except where jurisdiction has been limited or conferred exclusively upon another tribunal by law. The Circuit Courts are trial courts of general jurisdiction. Their jurisdiction is very broad but generally covers major civil cases and more serious criminal matters. Circuit Courts also may decide appeals from the District Court and certain administrative agencies. Cases can be heard by a jury when the amount in controversy is over $15,000. Juries are limited to the Circuit Courts.

The state is divided into eight judicial circuits, which are presently as follows:

- 1st Judicial Circuit (7 judges): Dorchester (1 judge), Somerset (1 judge), Wicomico (3 judges) & Worcester (2 judges) counties
- 2nd Judicial Circuit (7 judges): Caroline (1 judge), Cecil (3 judges), Kent (1 judge), Queen Anne's(1 judge) & Talbot (1 judge) counties
- 3rd Judicial Circuit (21 judges): Baltimore County (16 judges) & Harford County (5 judges)
- 4th Judicial Circuit (7 judges): Allegany (2 judges), Garrett (1 judge) & Washington (4 judges) counties
- 5th Judicial Circuit (18 judges): Anne Arundel (10 judges), Carroll (3 judges) & Howard (5 judges) counties
- 6th Judicial Circuit (24 judges): Frederick (4 judges) & Montgomery (20 judges) counties
- 7th Judicial Circuit (32 judges): Calvert (2 judges), Charles (4 judges), Prince George's (23 judges) & St Mary's (3 judges) counties
- 8th Judicial Circuit (30 judges): Baltimore

Unlike other state courts, the Circuit Court has no chief judge. Instead, eight circuit administrative judges perform administrative duties in each of their respective circuits. Each Circuit Court judge is appointed by the Governor (without Senate confirmation) for the temporary position until the next election . The judge's name is placed on the ballot in the first general election once they qualify and pay the standard filing fee for the vacancy the judge was appointed to fill. The judge may be opposed formally by one or more qualified members of the bar, with the successful candidate that the people have elected to a fifteen-year term.

=== District Court ===
The Maryland District Court has jurisdiction in minor civil and criminal matters, and in virtually all violations of the Motor Vehicle Law. Created by a constitutional amendment in 1970, the court began operating in July 1971. It replaced the justices of the peace, the county trial magistrates, the People's Courts (in certain counties), and various minor courts. With statewide jurisdiction, the Court functions in every county and Baltimore.

The exclusive jurisdiction of the District Court generally includes all landlord and tenant cases; replevin actions; motor vehicle violations; and criminal cases if the penalty is less than three years imprisonment or does not exceed a fine of $2,500, or both. The District Court has concurrent jurisdiction in misdemeanors and certain enumerated felonies, but has little equity jurisdiction. Small claims (civil cases involving amounts not exceeding $5,000) also come under the jurisdiction of the District Court. In civil cases involving amounts over $5,000 (but not exceeding $25,000), the District Court has concurrent jurisdiction with the circuit courts. Since the District Court provides no juries, a person entitled to and electing a jury trial must proceed to the Circuit Court. However, appeals from the District Court can be heard de novo in the Circuit Court.

District Court judges are appointed by the Governor to ten-year terms, subject to Senate confirmation. Unlike other judges in the state, they do not stand for election. As of October 2003, some 105 judges, including the Chief Judge, who is designated by the Chief Judge of the Supreme Court, serve on the Court. As the District Court's administrative head, its Chief Judge appoints administrative judges for each of the twelve districts, subject to the approval of the Chief Judge of the Supreme Court. Administered centrally, the District Court of Maryland is funded totally by the State.

The District Court of Maryland is divided into twelve geographical districts as follows:

- District 1 (26 judges): Baltimore
- District 2 (5 judges): Dorchester (1 judge), Somerset (1 judge), Wicomico (2 judges) & Worcester (1 judge) counties
- District 3 (6 judges): Caroline (1 judge), Cecil (2 judges), Kent (1 judge), Queen Anne's (1 judge) & Talbot (1 judge) counties
- District 4 (4 judges): Calvert (1 judge), Charles (2 judges) & St. Mary's (1 judge) counties
- District 5 (13 judges): Prince George's County
- District 6 (11 judges): Montgomery County
- District 7 (8 judges): Anne Arundel County
- District 8 (13 judges): Baltimore County
- District 9 (4 judges): Harford County
- District 10 (7 judges): Carroll (2 judges) & Howard (5 judges) counties
- District 11 (5 judges): Frederick (3 judges) & Washington (2 judges) counties
- District 12 (3 judges): Allegany (2 judges) & Garrett (1 judge) counties

== Local government ==
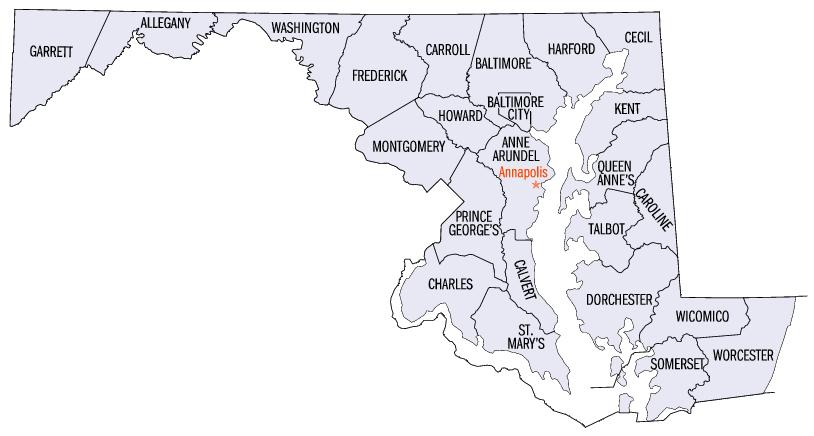
The 23 counties of Maryland, Baltimore, and the state capital of Annapolis, denoted in red)

At the local level, Maryland is notable among U.S. states for having a relatively small number of local governments. There are three forms of county government available to the state's counties. Note that the independent city of Baltimore is typically considered to be on par with the counties; it is reckoned as a county-equivalent for census purposes. Including Baltimore, there are 157 incorporated cities in Maryland. Maryland has no township or independent school district governments.

=== Commissioner counties ===
In 1827, the General Assembly authorized elected boards of county commissioners for each county. Under the state constitution, the General Assembly retains full authority to legislate for a commissioner county. County commissioners have no authority to act in local matters without the express prior consent of the General Assembly. In the areas where they do have authority to legislate, that authority is narrowly construed; it is limited to areas authorized by the General Assembly, enabling legislation, or public local laws. The Constitution adopted in 1867 kept the power to pass public local laws vested in the General Assembly, which gave a lot of control over county government to county delegations in the General Assembly. As a result of this, the General Assembly spends considerable time dealing with local issues, ordinances, and expenditures.

Currently, six counties are run by commissioners. They are: Calvert, Carroll, Garrett, St. Mary's, Somerset, and Washington Counties.

In 2010, the voters of Cecil County adopted a resolution to become a charter county and subsequently elected Tari Moore as the first county executive.

=== Charter counties ===
Due partly to the large amount of time spent by the state legislature on local matters, the Maryland Constitution was amended in 1915 to allow counties the option of operating under a charter form of government, with substantial home rule power. To adopt this form of government, the voters of the county must approve the charter which their charter board drafts.

Charter counties are governed by an elected county council with power to legislate on almost all local matters. Their authority is fairly broadly construed, though the regulation of elections and the manufacture and sale of alcoholic beverages is reserved to the General Assembly. The General Assembly also retains considerable authority over taxation, except in Baltimore and Montgomery counties. Some counties which operate under charters have a separately-elected county executive while others vest executive functions along with legislative functions in the county council.

Currently, eleven counties, including the most populous ones, operate under the charter form of government. They are: Anne Arundel (1964), Baltimore (1956), Cecil (2012), Dorchester (2002), Frederick (2014), Harford (1972), Howard (1968), Montgomery (1948), Prince George's (1970), Talbot (1973), and Wicomico (1964) Counties. Baltimore also operates under a charter.

=== Code Home Rule counties ===
Due to the reluctance of many counties to adopt a charter form of government, despite wanting a measure of home rule, the Maryland Constitution was again amended in 1966 to create a third class of county government, the "code home rule" status. If two thirds of a county's commissioners adopt a resolution that the county become a code county and a majority of the voters approve of the resolution, the county becomes a code county. In a code county, the county commissioners have home-rule powers, and may enact legislation in the areas of the "express powers" of the charter counties. In addition, the commissioners retain all the powers of commissioners in commissioner counties. However, code counties have stricter limits on indebtedness than charter counties. The General Assembly can only legislate for the code counties as a class.

"Express Powers" include franchises, appointment and compensation of county officers, merit system, pensions, group health benefits and joint pooling agreements, tax collections, campground and RVs, publishing and audits, claim proof, competitive bidding and bonds, records, health measures, road maintenance and engineering, prisoner compensation, county police, hearings, plumbing and zoning permits, residential land development, building code, licensing, parks and recreation, refuse collection and disposal. (with various exceptions)

— Article 25, Annotated Code of Maryland, Section 3

Currently, six counties operate as code counties: Allegany, Caroline, Charles, Kent, Queen Anne's, and Worcester Counties.

== Maryland and the national government ==
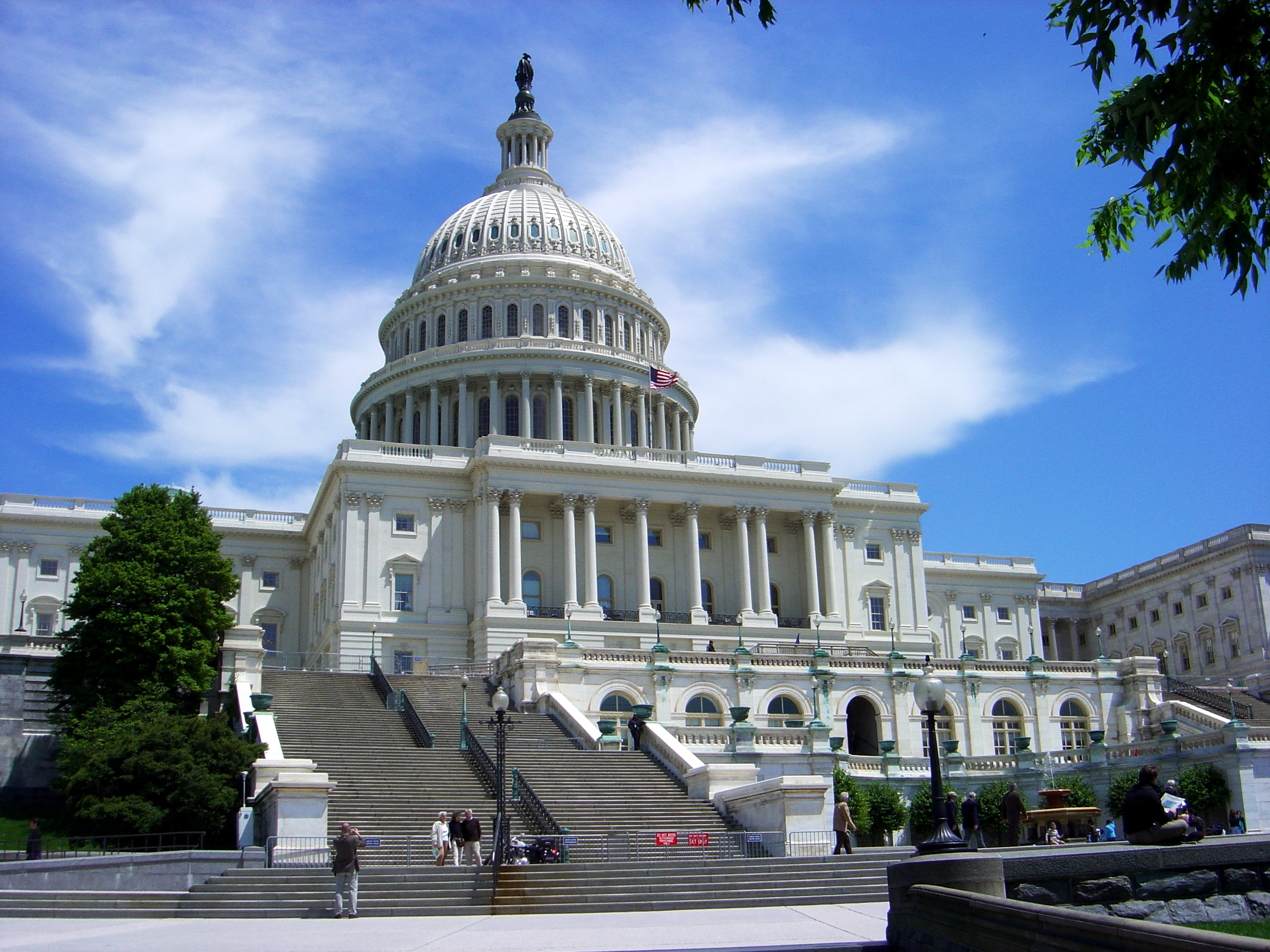
The United States Capitol in Washington, D.C.

Maryland was the seventh state to ratify the United States Constitution, on April 28, 1788. Maryland elects two United States Senators and eight members of the United States House of Representatives. The state is served by the U.S. District Court for the District of Maryland (with two divisions, sitting in Baltimore and Greenbelt) and federal appeals from the state go to the United States Court of Appeals for the Fourth Circuit in Richmond, Virginia.

== See also ==
- History of Maryland
- Maryland Constitution of 1776
- State government in the United States
- Political party strength in Maryland
- Impeachment in Maryland
