= E. Gregory Wells =

American judge (born 1961)

Gregory Wells
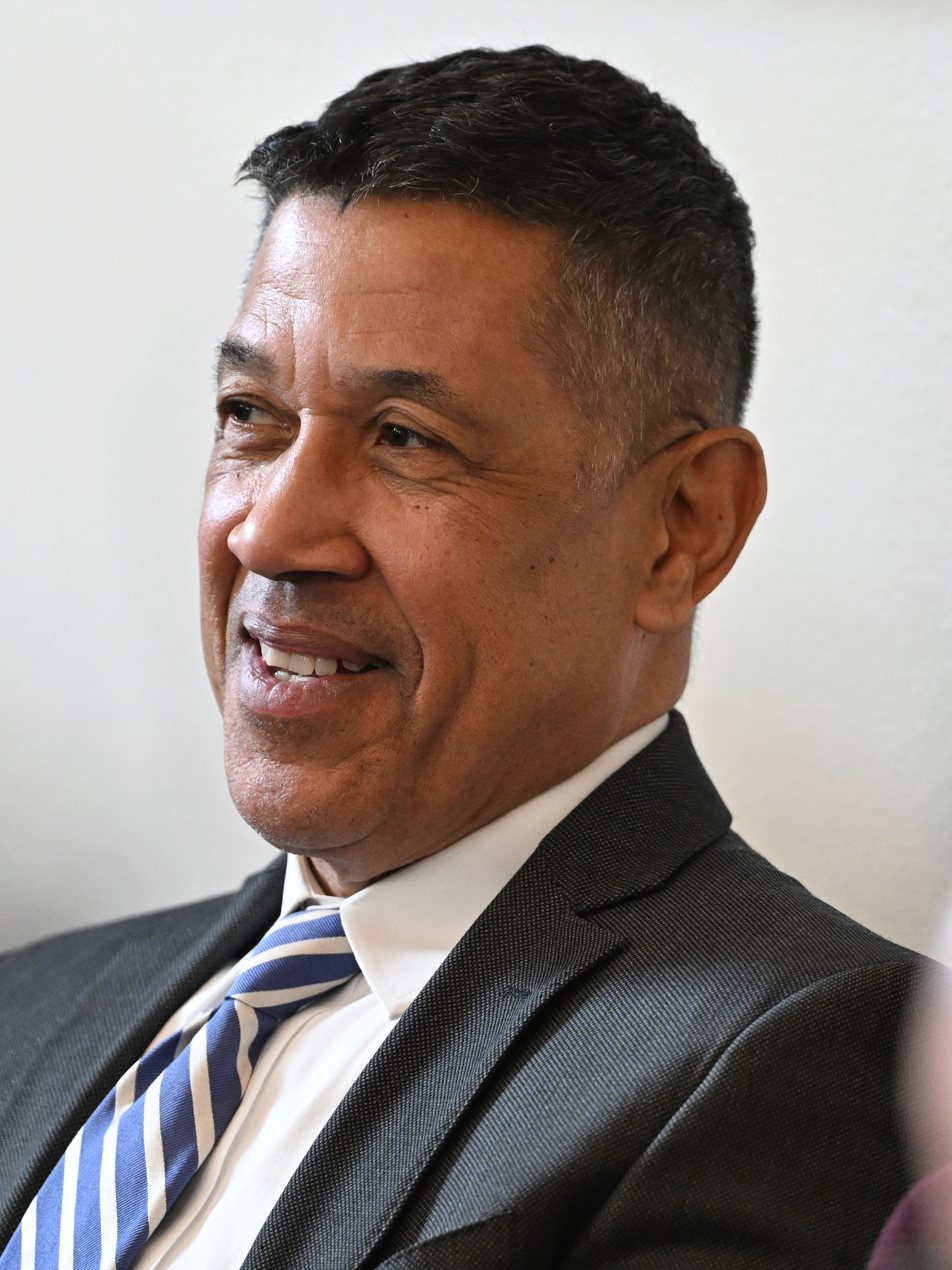
- Wells in 2025

Chief Judge of the Maryland Appellate Court
- Incumbent
- Assumed office April 15, 2022
- Appointed by: Larry Hogan
- Preceded by: Matthew J. Fader

Judge of the Maryland Appellate Court
- In office April 19, 2019 – April 15, 2022
- Appointed by: Larry Hogan
- Preceded by: Deborah Eyler
- Succeeded by: Anne Albright

Administrative Judge of the 7th Maryland Circuit Court for Calvert County
- In office March 1, 2019 – March 21, 2019
- Preceded by: Marjorie Clagett
- Succeeded by: Mark Chandlee

Associate Judge of the 7th Maryland Circuit Court for Calvert County
- In office November 15, 2012 – March 1, 2019
- Appointed by: Martin O'Malley
- Preceded by: Warren Krug
- Succeeded by: Andrew Rappaport

Associate Judge of the Maryland 4th District Court for Calvert County
- In office September 8, 2008 – November 15, 2012
- Appointed by: Martin O'Malley
- Preceded by: Seat established
- Succeeded by: Michelle Saunders

State's Attorney of Calvert County
- In office December 15, 2005 – December 2006
- Preceded by: Robert Riddle
- Succeeded by: Laura Martin

Personal details
- Born: June 28, 1961 (age 65) Washington, D.C., U.S.
- Party: Democratic
- Education: College of William and Mary (BA); University of Virginia (JD)

E. Gregory Wells (born June 28, 1961) is an American lawyer who has served as the chief judge of the Appellate Court of Maryland since 2022.

== Education ==
Wells was born in Washington, D.C., and attended Gonzaga College High School. He earned his Bachelor of Arts from The College of William & Mary and received his Juris Doctor from the University of Virginia School of Law.

== Legal career ==
Wells was an assistant state's attorney in Prince George's County from 1989 to 1994. He then became deputy state's attorney for Calvert County from 1995 to 1998. In 1998, he was selected to become a magistrate (formerly master) in domestic relations and juvenile causes in the Calvert County Circuit Court, a position he held until 2005. Between 2005 and 2006, he was the state's attorney for Calvert County before leaving be an assistant attorney general in the Criminal Appeals Division of the Office of the Attorney General of Maryland from 2007 to 2008.

== Judicial career ==
From September 8, 2008, to November 15, 2012, Wells was an associate judge of the District Court of Maryland, District 4, Calvert County. He was on the Calvert County Circuit Court from 2012 to 2019, first as an associate judge from November 15, 2012, to March 1, 2019, and then as a county administrative judge from March 1 to March 21, 2019. On March 12, 2019, Governor Larry Hogan announced the appointment of Wells to be a judge on the Maryland Court of Special Appeals. On February 17, 2022, Hogan announced that he was appointing Wells chief judge of the Court of Special Appeals, succeeding Matthew J. Fader upon his appointment to the Maryland Court of Appeals.

== See also ==
- List of LGBT jurists in the United States
