= Steven B. Gould =

American judge (born 1966)

Steven Gould
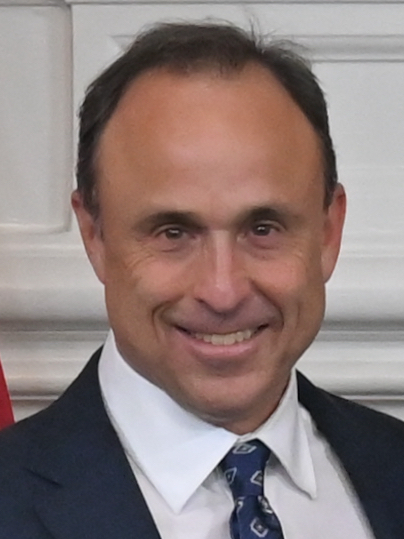

Justice of the Supreme Court of Maryland
- Incumbent
- Assumed office September 11, 2021
- Appointed by: Larry Hogan
- Preceded by: Mary Ellen Barbera

Personal details
- Born: Steven Bennett Gould; 1966 (age 58–59); Washington, D.C., U.S.
- Education: University of Pennsylvania (BA); Boston University (JD)

Steven Bennett Gould (born 1966) is an American lawyer who has served as a justice of the Supreme Court of Maryland since 2021. He served as a judge of the Maryland Court of Special Appeals from 2019 to 2021.

== Early life and education ==
Gould was born in 1966 in Washington, D.C. He received his Bachelor of Arts from the University of Pennsylvania in 1988 and his Juris Doctor, cum laude, from the Boston University School of Law in 1992.

== Legal and academic career ==
Gould is a trial lawyer and civil litigator. From 1993 to 1994 he was an associate with Brown, Rudnick & Gesner. From 1995 to 1997 he was a partner with Flyer & Gould, LLC. He was a sole practitioner from 1994 to 1995 and again from 1997 to 1998. He is a founding partner of Brown Gould Kiely, LLP where he served from 1998 to 2019. Since 2021, he has been an adjunct associate professor at the Washington College of Law of American University.

== Judicial career ==
=== Maryland Court of Special Appeals ===
On March 12, 2019, Governor Larry Hogan appointed Gould to be a judge of the Maryland Court of Special Appeals. On March 22, 2019, his nomination was confirmed by the Maryland Senate. He was sworn in as a Judge of the Maryland Court of Special Appeals on April 18, 2019.

=== Maryland Court of Appeals ===
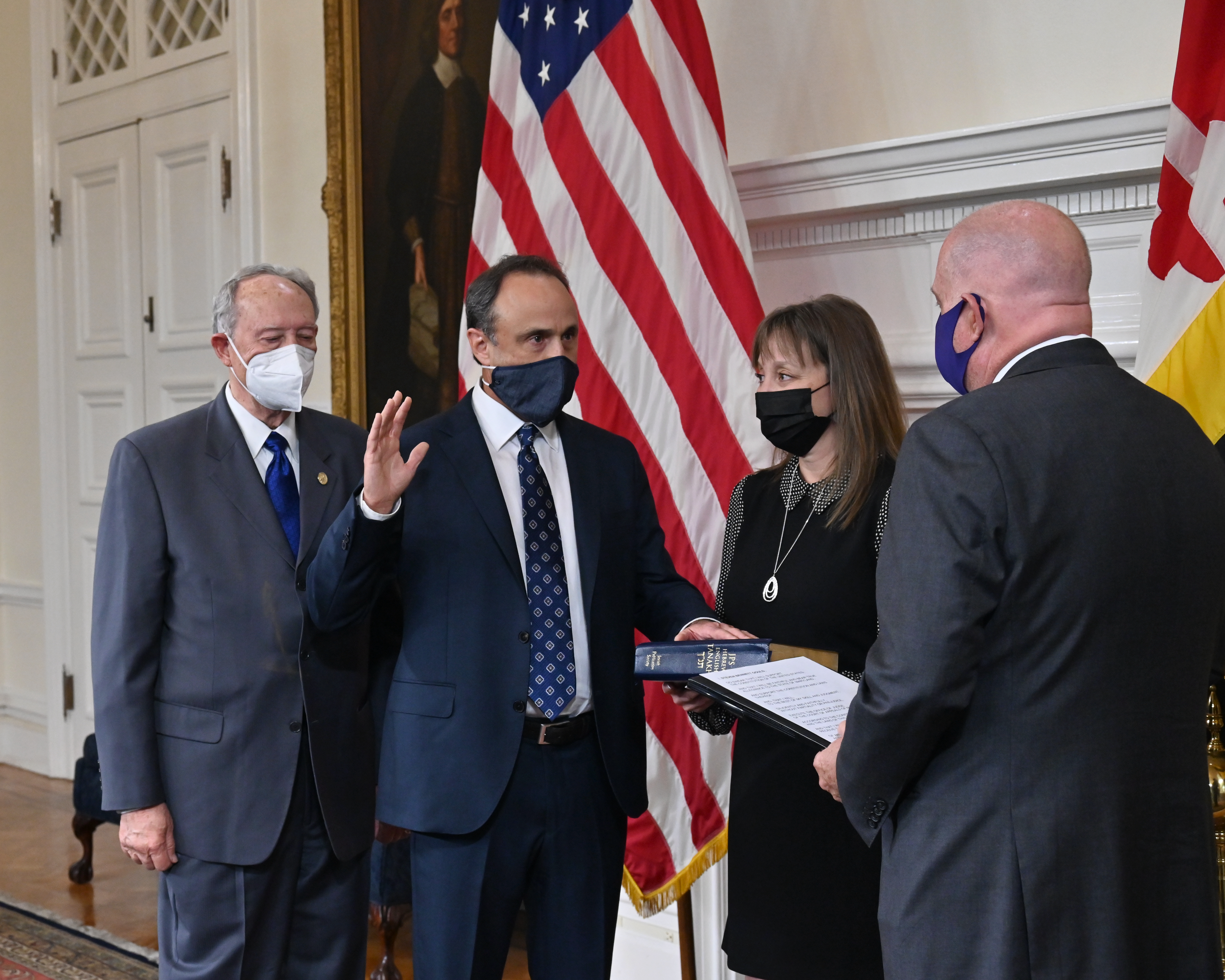
Gould being sworn in as judge by Governor Larry Hogan

Gould was one of six applicants who applied for the upcoming vacancy on the Maryland Court of Appeals, four of the names were submitted to the governor. On September 3, 2021, Governor Larry Hogan announced the appointment of Gould to be a judge of the Maryland Court of Appeals to fill the vacancy to be left by Judge Mary Ellen Barbera who reached the mandatory retirement age on September 10, 2021.

== Community involvement ==
From 2007 to 2010, Gould served a volunteer judge for the Maryland High School Mock Trial Competition. From 2004 to 2008, he has been a coach for children's baseball, basketball, and soccer. Since 2008, he has been a member of Congregation B'Nai Tzedek; serving on the board of directors from 2013 to 2014 and as general counsel from 2015 to 2019.

Legal offices
Preceded by Mary Ellen Barbera	Judge of the Maryland Court of Appeals; 2021–present	Incumbent
