= Angela M. Eaves =

American judge (born 1959)

Angela Eaves
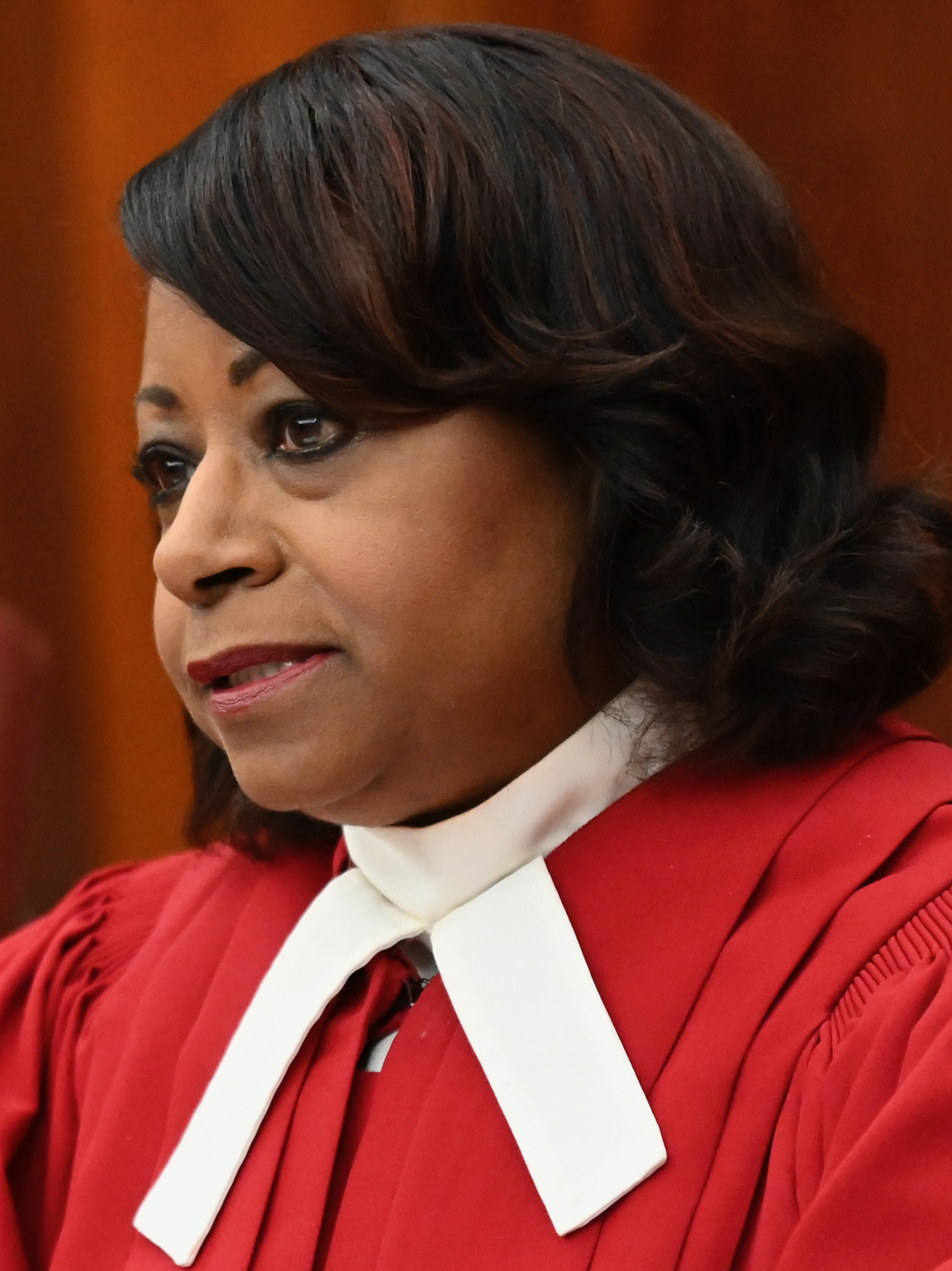

Justice of the Supreme Court of Maryland
- Incumbent
- Assumed office April 12, 2022
- Appointed by: Larry Hogan
- Preceded by: Robert N. McDonald

Personal details
- Born: April 22, 1959 (age 66); Panama Canal Zone, U.S.
- Education: University of Texas, Austin (BA, MA, JD)

Angela M. Eaves (born April 22, 1959) is an American lawyer and judge. She is a justice of the Supreme Court of Maryland. She served as an administrative judge for the 3rd Judicial Circuit for Harford County from 2015 to 2022.

== Early life and education ==
Eaves was born on April 22, 1959, in the Panama Canal Zone. She attended Copperas Cove High School; she received a Bachelor of Arts in 1981 and a Master of Arts in 1986, both from the University of Texas and her Juris Doctor from the University of Texas School of Law in 1986.

== Legal career ==
Eaves was an assistant city attorney for the city of Dallas from 1987 to 1989. She served as a staff attorney with the Maryland Legal Aid Bureau and from 1993 to 2000.

== Judicial career ==
From March 27, 2000, to December 28, 2007, Eaves was an associate judge of the District Court of Maryland, District 9, Harford County. She has served on the Harford County Circuit Court since 2007, first as an associate judge from December 28, 2007, to January 26, 2015, and then as a county administrative judge from January 26, 2015, to March 23, 2022, she succeeded Judge William O. Carr, who retired.

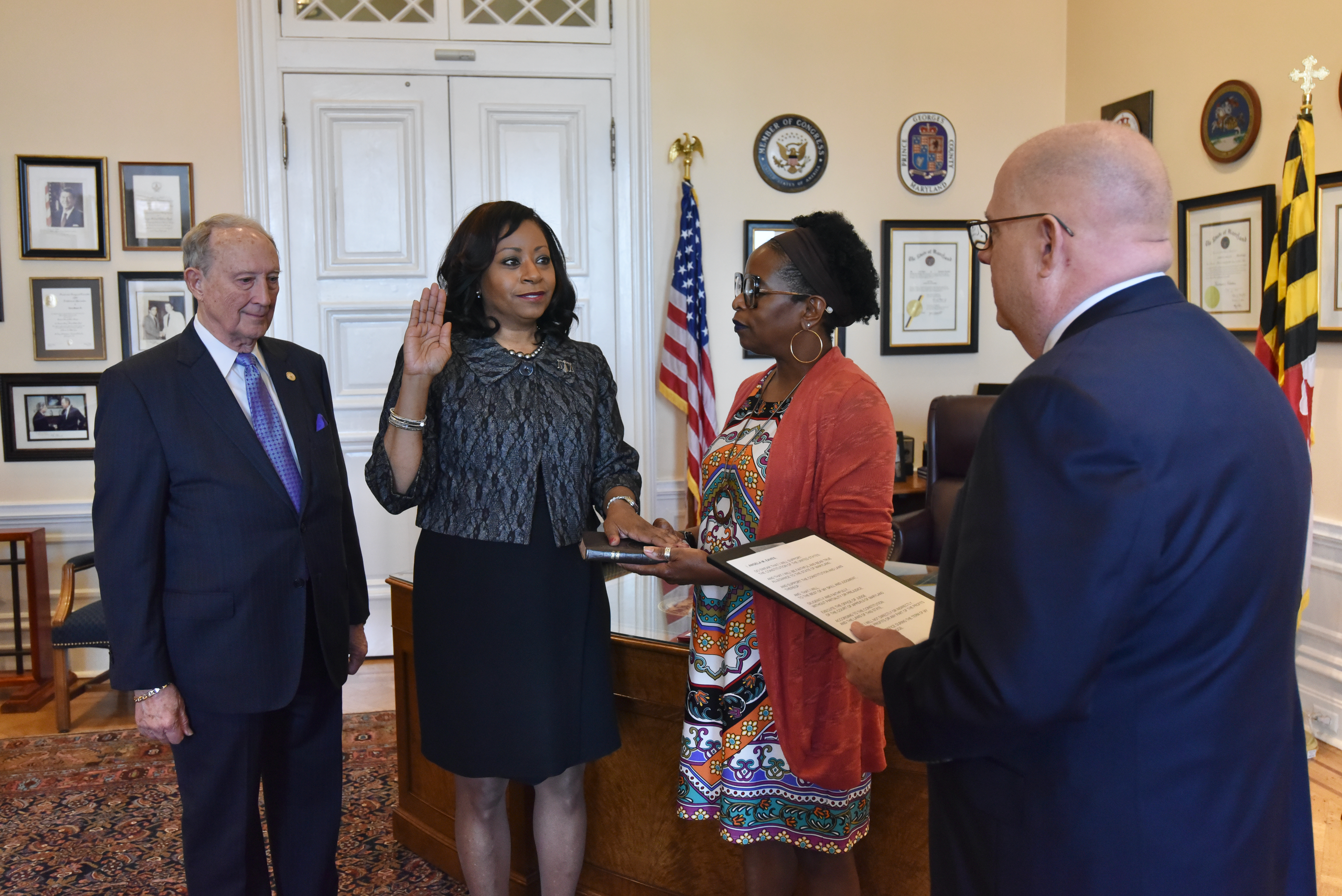
Swearing in of Judge Angela Eaves in April 2022

On February 17, 2022, governor Larry Hogan announced the appointment of Eaves to be a justice of the Supreme Court of Maryland to the seat to be vacated by judge Robert N. McDonald when he reached mandatory retirement age on February 23, 2022. She is the first Hispanic appointed to Maryland's appellate courts. On March 7, 2022, a committee hearing was held on her nomination, and March 9 her nomination was reported favorably out of committee. On March 15, 2022, her nomination was confirmed by the Maryland Senate. She was sworn into office on April 12, 2022, making her the first Hispanic to serve on the Court of Appeals.

== Personal life ==
Eaves' mother is Panamanian and her father is African American.

== See also ==
- List of Hispanic and Latino American jurists

Legal offices
Preceded by Robert N. McDonald	Justice of the Supreme Court of Maryland; 2022–present	Incumbent
