= Matthew J. Fader =

American judge (born 1973)

Matt Fader
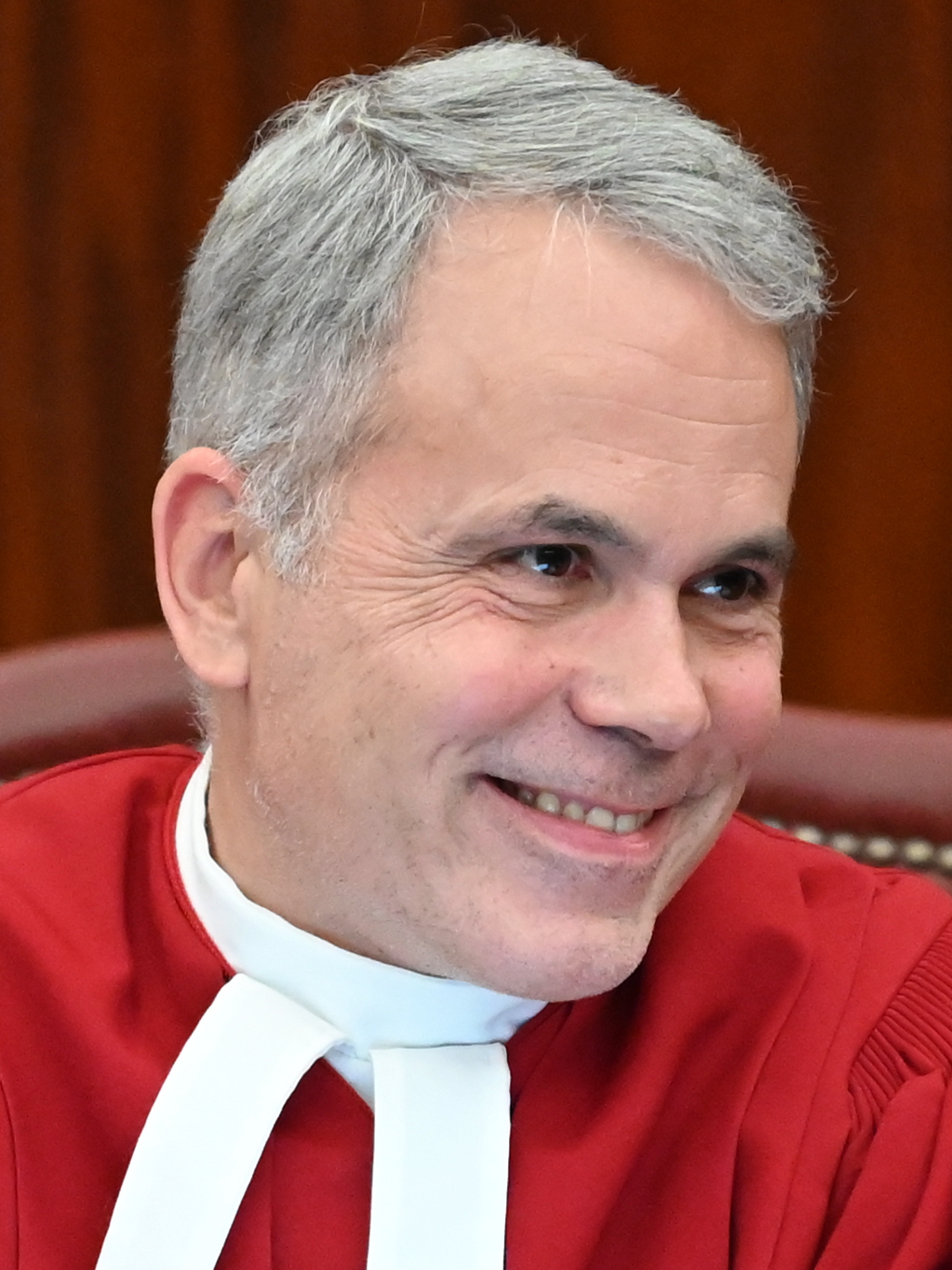

Chief Justice of the Maryland Supreme Court
- Incumbent
- Assumed office April 15, 2022
- Appointed by: Larry Hogan
- Preceded by: Joseph M. Getty

Chief Judge of the Appellate Court of Maryland
- In office November 28, 2018 – April 15, 2022
- Appointed by: Larry Hogan
- Preceded by: Patrick Woodward
- Succeeded by: E. Gregory Wells

Judge of the Appellate Court of Maryland
- In office November 1, 2017 – November 28, 2018
- Appointed by: Larry Hogan
- Preceded by: Peter B. Krauser
- Succeeded by: E. Gregory Wells

Personal details
- Born: 1973 (age 51–52); Towson, Maryland, U.S.
- Education: University of Virginia (BA); Yale University (JD)

Matthew J. Fader (born 1973) is an American lawyer serving as the chief justice of the Supreme Court of Maryland since 2022. He previously served as the chief judge of the Maryland Court of Special Appeals from 2018 to 2022.

== Early life and education ==
Matthew J. Fader was born in 1973 in Towson, Maryland. He received his Bachelor of Arts from the University of Virginia in 1995, where he was a member of Phi Beta Kappa. Fader received his Juris Doctor from Yale Law School in 1998, where he was senior editor of the Yale Law Journal.

== Legal career ==
Fader began his legal career serving as a law clerk for judge Leonie M. Brinkema of the United States District Court for the Eastern District of Virginia from 1998 to 1999. He served as a trial attorney with the United States Department of Justice from 1999 to 2002. From 2002 to 2006, he was an associate with K&L Gates, becoming a partner in 2006 and remaining so until 2010. From 2010 to 2017, he served in the office of the Maryland Attorney General; serving as an assistant attorney general from 2010 to 2012, deputy chief of the civil litigation division from 2012 to 2017, and chief of the civil litigation division in 2017.

== Judicial career ==
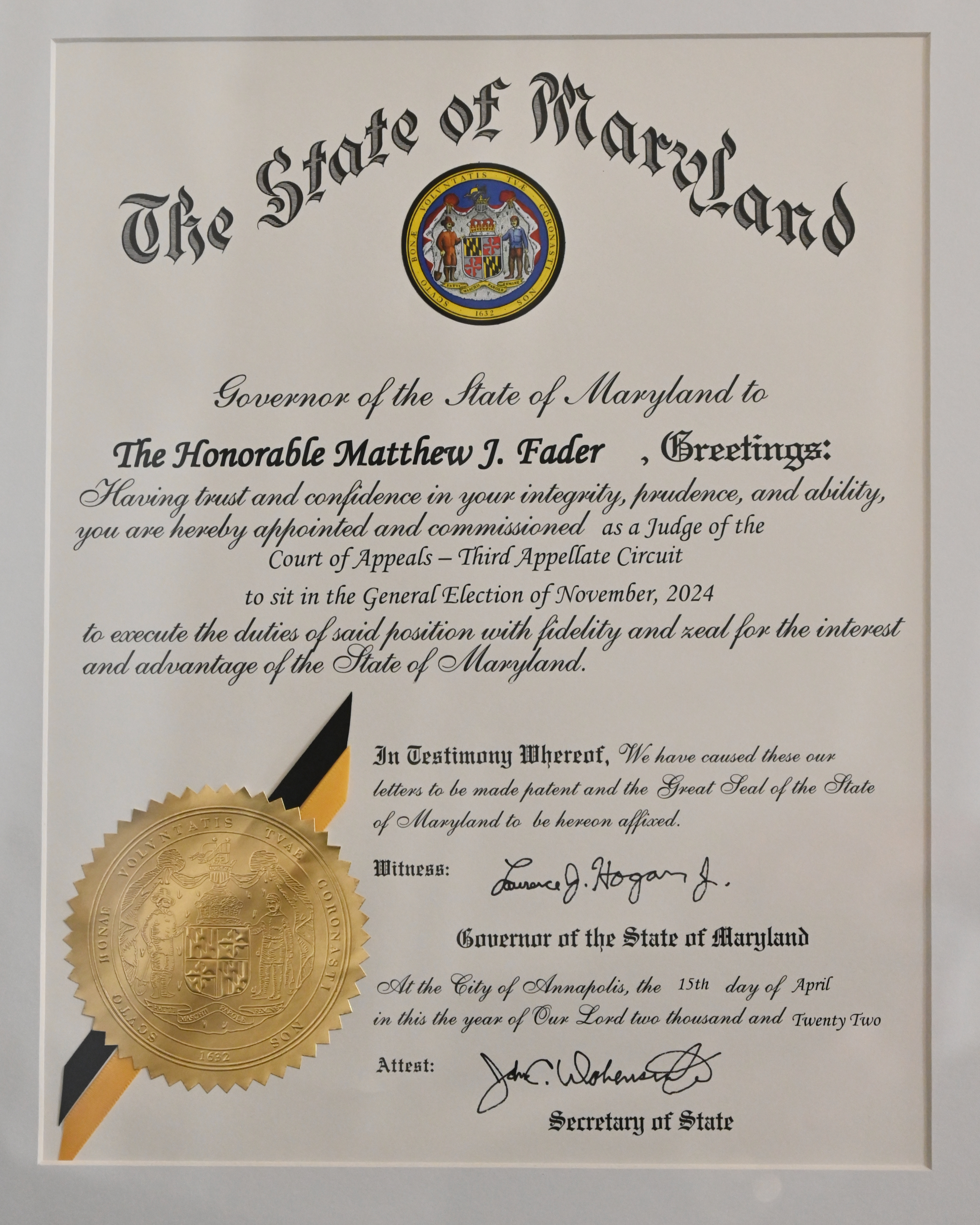
Appointment as a judge of the Maryland Court of Special Appeals

On October 6, 2017, governor Larry Hogan announced the appointment of Fader to serve as a judge of the Maryland Court of Special Appeals. His term began on November 1, 2017. On November 20, 2018, Governor Hogan announced his designation of Fader as chief judge; his term as chief judge began on November 28, 2018. On February 17, 2022, Governor Hogan announced the appointment of Fader to be a justice of the Supreme Court of Maryland to the seat vacated by judge Joseph M. Getty when he reached mandatory retirement age on April 14, 2022. On March 7, 2022, a committee hearing was held on his nomination, and on March 9, his nomination was reported favorably out of committee. The Maryland Senate confirmed his nomination on March 15, 2022, and he was sworn in as Chief Justice on April 15, 2022.

Legal offices
Preceded by Joseph M. Getty	Chief Judge of the Maryland Supreme Court; 2022–present	Incumbent
