= Irma S. Raker =

American judge

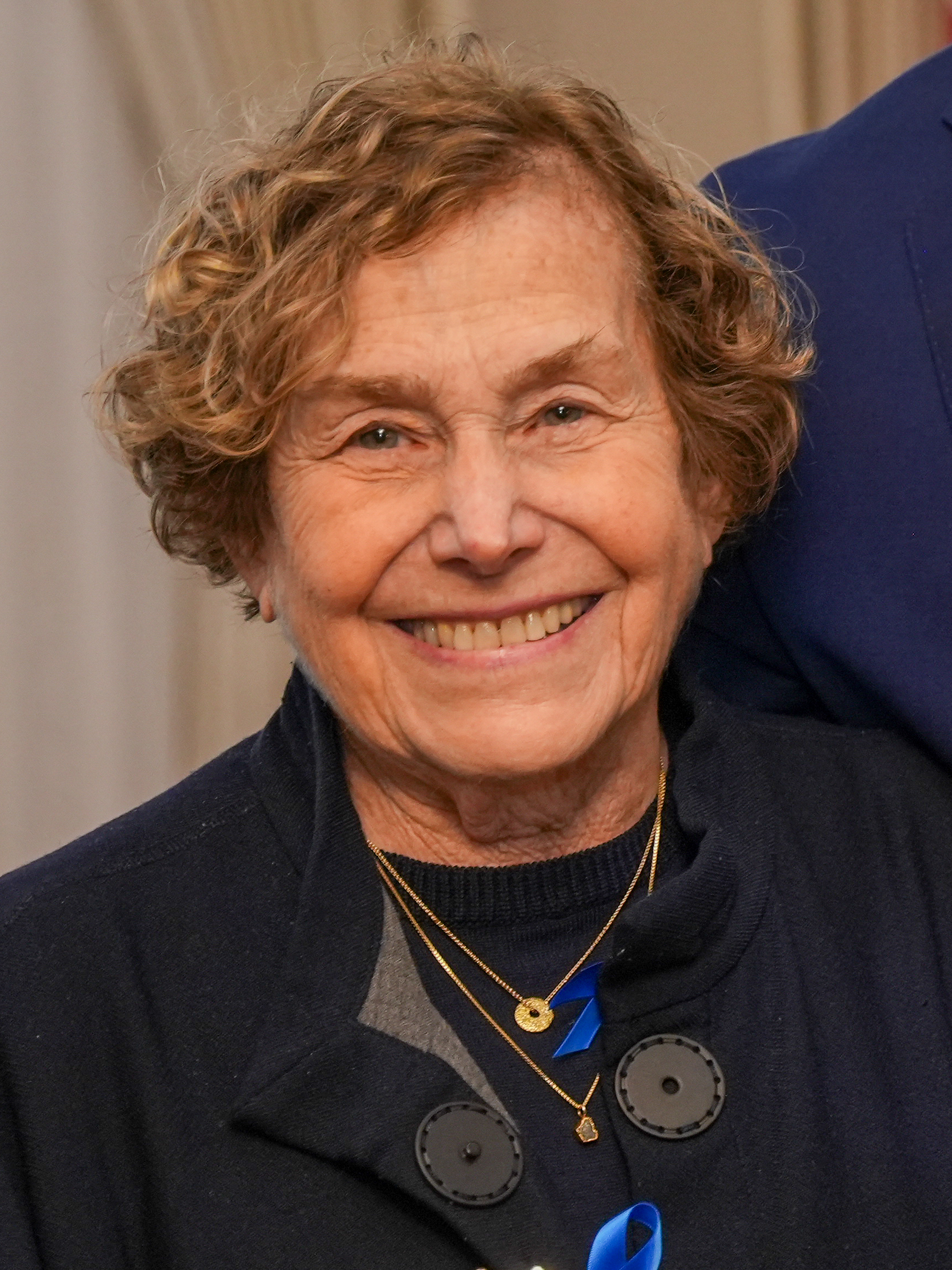

Senior Judge of the Maryland Court of Appeals
- Incumbent
- Assumed office April 24, 2008

Judge of the Maryland Court of Appeals from the 7th Appellate Judicial Circuit (Montgomery County)
- In office January 7, 1994 – April 24, 2008
- Appointed by: William D. Schaefer
- Preceded by: John F. McAuliffe
- Succeeded by: Mary Ellen Barbera

Associate Judge of the Montgomery County Circuit Court (6th Judicial Circuit)
- In office February 3, 1982 – December 1993

Associate Judge of the Montgomery County District Court (6th District)
- In office March 21, 1980 – February 2, 1982

Personal details
- Born: Irma Steinberg; April 24, 1938 (age 87) Brooklyn, New York, U.S.
- Spouse: Samuel K. Raker
- Education: Syracuse University (B.A.); Hague Academy of International Law; American University (J.D.)

Irma Steinberg Raker (born April 24, 1938) is a Senior Judge of the Maryland Court of Appeals, the state's highest court. In 2007, she was awarded the American Bar Association's Margaret Brent Award for outstanding women lawyers who have achieved professional excellence and paved the way for other women in the legal profession.

She was born Irma Steinberg in Brooklyn, New York, and attended local schools including Midwood High School. She graduated from Syracuse University in 1959 and studied at The Hague Academy of International Law.

Steinberg interrupted her education to marry Samuel K. Raker and oversee the early development of their three children. She then returned to her studies, earning a J.D. degree from the American University in Washington, D.C. in 1972. She was admitted to the Maryland bar the next year.

Raker served as an Assistant State's Attorney for Montgomery County, Maryland from 1973 to 1979. Judge Raker took the bench when she was appointed a trial judge in Maryland's District Court of Maryland and then the Circuit Court for Montgomery County. She served in a number of increasingly responsible judicial positions until Governor Schaefer appointed her to the Maryland Court of Appeals, the state's highest court. She became a Senior Judge in 2008 and currently sits by designation.

Judge Raker currently serves as the Chairperson of the Maryland Access to Justice Commission. She is actively engaged in private mediation and arbitration.
