= Peter B. Krauser =

American judge

Peter Brunswick Krauser (born May 5, 1947) is an American jurist who served as the chief judge of the Maryland Court of Special Appeals. Prior to his appointment to the court, he was the chair of the Maryland Democratic Party.

== Early life and education ==
Krauser was born in Philadelphia, Pennsylvania. He received a Bachelor of Arts from Northwestern University in 1969. He studied law at the University of Pennsylvania Law School, where he received a Juris Doctor in 1972.

Krauser is married to Sherrie Lavine Krauser, who was a circuit court judge in Prince George's County, Maryland, having been appointed in 1995 by governor Parris Glendening, and retired in 2013. They have two children.

== Career ==
Krauser began his legal career as a law clerk for Judge John P. Fullam of the United States District Court for the Eastern District of Pennsylvania. Krauser was an appellate attorney for the United States Department of Justice, and was also a public defender for the city of Philadelphia.

Krauser was the state chair of the National Jewish Democratic Council, appointed by Governor Glendening in 1997. He was also president of the Jewish Community Council of Greater Washington. Prior to his appointment to the Court of Special Appeals by Governor Glendening in 2000, Krauser served as the chair of the Maryland Democratic Party.

Krauser served as the chief judge of the Court of Special Appeals from 2007 to 2017.
