= James F. Matousek =

American attorney and civil servant (1908–1974)

- Born: James Frank Matousek; July 15, 1908; Baltimore, Maryland, U.S.
- Died: February 18, 1974 (aged 65); Baltimore, Maryland, U.S.
- Education: Johns Hopkins University; University of Maryland (LLB)
- Occupations: Attorney; civil servant
- Years active: 1932–1973

James Frank Matousek, Sr. (July 15, 1908 – February 18, 1974) was an American attorney and civil servant who served the City of Baltimore in various legal and administrative capacities for more than four decades. A longtime aide to Mayor Howard W. Jackson, Matousek later worked in labor relations for the Bethlehem Steel Corporation and, in his final years, as an assistant city solicitor.

== Early life and education ==
James Frank Matousek was born on July 15, 1908 in Baltimore, Maryland, United States. He graduated cum laude from Baltimore City College and received the George Peabody Prize to attend Johns Hopkins University. He left Johns Hopkins in 1929, after the death of his father, and he entered the University of Maryland School of Law, earning a Bachelor of Laws degree in 1932.

== Career and civic involvement ==
After graduation, Matousek was admitted to the Maryland State Bar Association in 1932. In 1936, he entered municipal service as a secretary to Mayor Howard W. Jackson. Reports in The Baltimore Sun and The Evening Sun from 1936 to 1943 identify him as an assistant secretary in the Mayor's Office, where he handled administrative correspondence, public inquiries, and legal filings.

After leaving Baltimore City Hall, he joined the Bethlehem Steel Corporation at Sparrows Point, serving for twenty-five years as a technical assistant in the labor relations and contract department of the shipbuilding division. Alongside his corporate work, Matousek maintained a private legal practice in Baltimore, handling civil and administrative matters for local clients.

In the 1960s, Matousek remained active in civic and political affairs, including service as treasurer for attorney Irving Winston Mezger's campaign for the Maryland Constitutional Convention and rejoining city government as an assistant city solicitor. The Baltimore Afro-American listed him among the office's legal staff in 1973, working under city solicitor George L. Russell Jr., noting the breadth of civil and property-law matters handled by the division. Matousek left the position in late 1973 because of illness.

Outside of his professional duties, Matousek was active in the Brooklyn Lions Club and held memberships in the Masonic Blue Lodge No. 60 and the Shriners.

== Death ==
Matousek died on February 18, 1974, at University of Maryland Medical Center in Baltimore at the age of 65. He was survived by his wife, a son, and two grandsons.

== See also ==
- History of Czechs in Baltimore
- List of University of Maryland Francis King Carey School of Law alumni
