= Robert N. McDonald =

American judge

Coordinates: 38.9852°N 76.501418°W

Judge of the Maryland Court of Appeals
- In office January 24, 2012 – February 23, 2022
- Nominated by: Martin O'Malley
- Preceded by: Joseph F. Murphy Jr.
- Succeeded by: Angela M. Eaves

Personal details
- Born: February 23, 1952 (age 73); Queens, New York, U.S.
- Education: Harvard University (AB); Harvard Law School (JD)

Robert N. McDonald (born February 23, 1952) is a former judge of the Maryland Court of Appeals. He was appointed to the Court by Governor Martin O'Malley in 2012.

== Personal life and education ==
Robert N. McDonald was born on February 23, 1952, in Queens, New York. He graduated from Regis High School in 1970, earned a Bachelor of Arts in economics from Harvard University, summa cum laude, in 1974, and earned his Juris Doctor from Harvard Law School, magna cum laude, in 1977. At Harvard Law School, Judge McDonald served on the editorial board of the Harvard Law Review from 1975 to 1977. He is a nephew of former U.S. House of Representatives member John N. Erlenborn.

== Career ==
Prior to his appointment to the bench, Judge McDonald had a distinguished career in public service, serving in the United States Attorneys Office and later in the Office of the Attorney General of Maryland.

Legal offices
Preceded by Joseph F. Murphy Jr.	Judge of the Maryland Court of Appeals; 2012–2022	Vacant
