= Courts of Maryland =

Courts of the U.S. state

Courts of Maryland include:

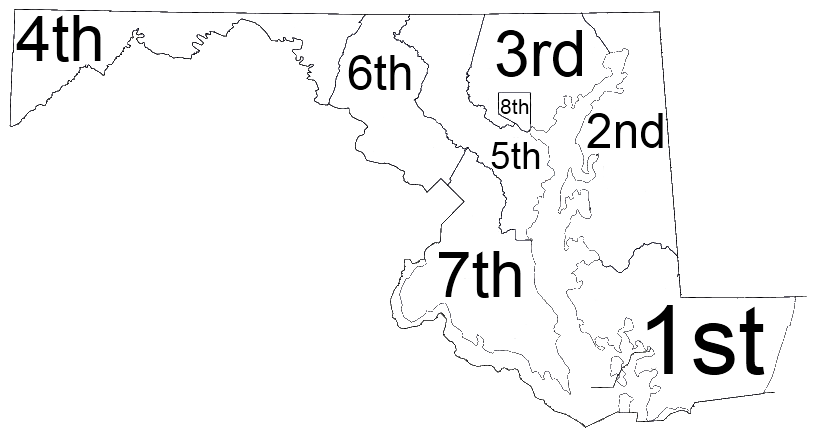
Maryland judicial circuit map

State courts of Maryland

- Supreme Court of Maryland
  - Appellate Court of Maryland
    - Maryland Circuit Courts (8 judicial circuits)
      - Maryland District Courts (34 locations in 12 judicial districts)

Federal courts located in Maryland

- United States District Court for the District of Maryland

Former federal courts of Maryland

- United States District Court for the District of Potomac (1801–1802; also contained the District of Columbia and pieces of Virginia; extinct, reorganized)
