= Talbot County District Courthouse =

District Court in Easton, Maryland, US

Coordinates: 38°46′27″N 76°4′45″W

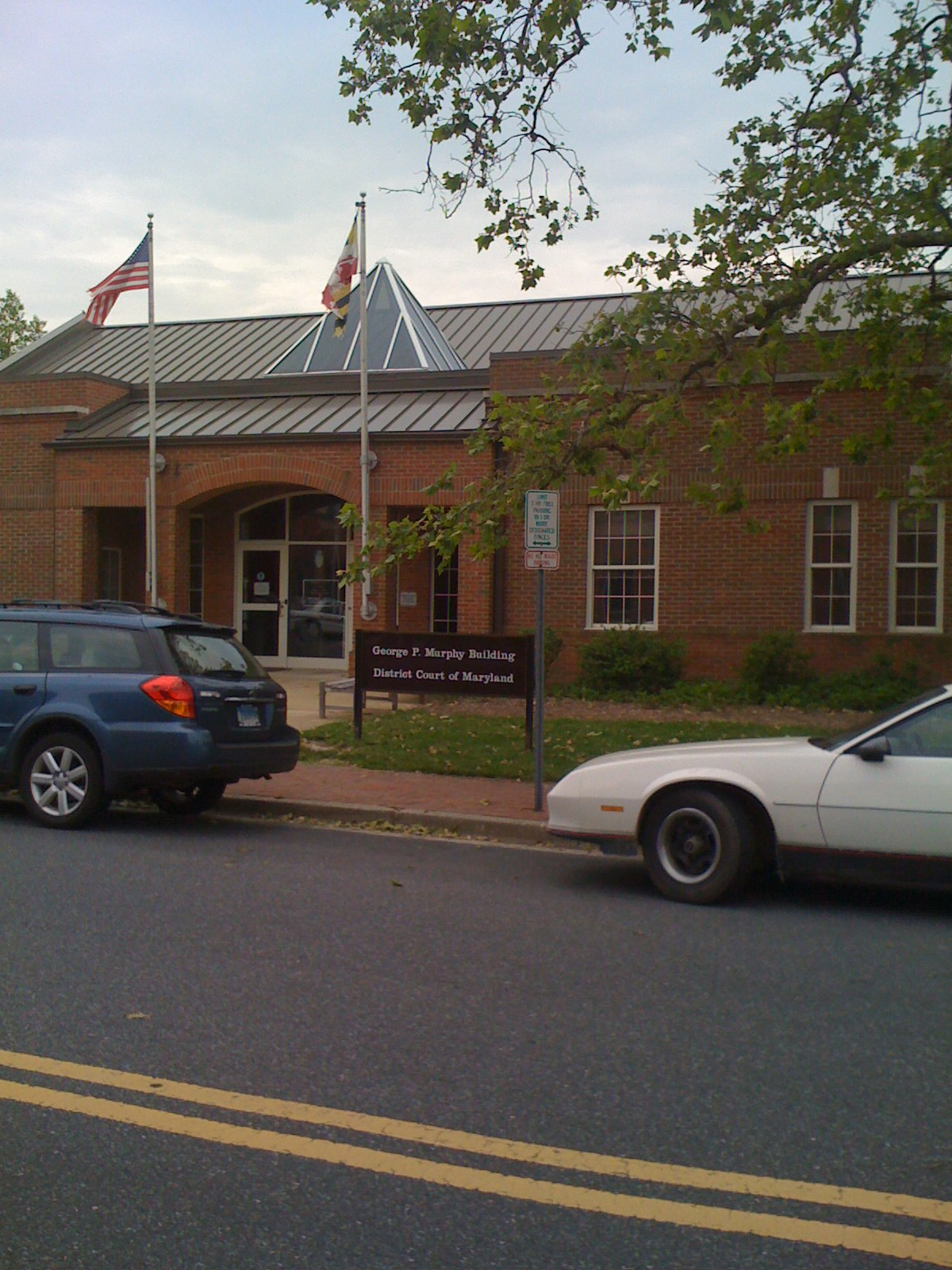
- Location: Easton, Maryland, United States

The District Court of Maryland for Talbot County District Courthouse is located in Easton, Maryland. Jurisdiction of the District Court includes most landlord- tenant cases, small claims for amounts up to $5,000, replevin actions, motor vehicle violations, misdemeanors, certain felonies, and peace and protective orders with one judge, Hugh Adkins, presiding.
