= Maryland District Court =

State lower trial court (court of original jurisdiction) in the U.S. state of Maryland

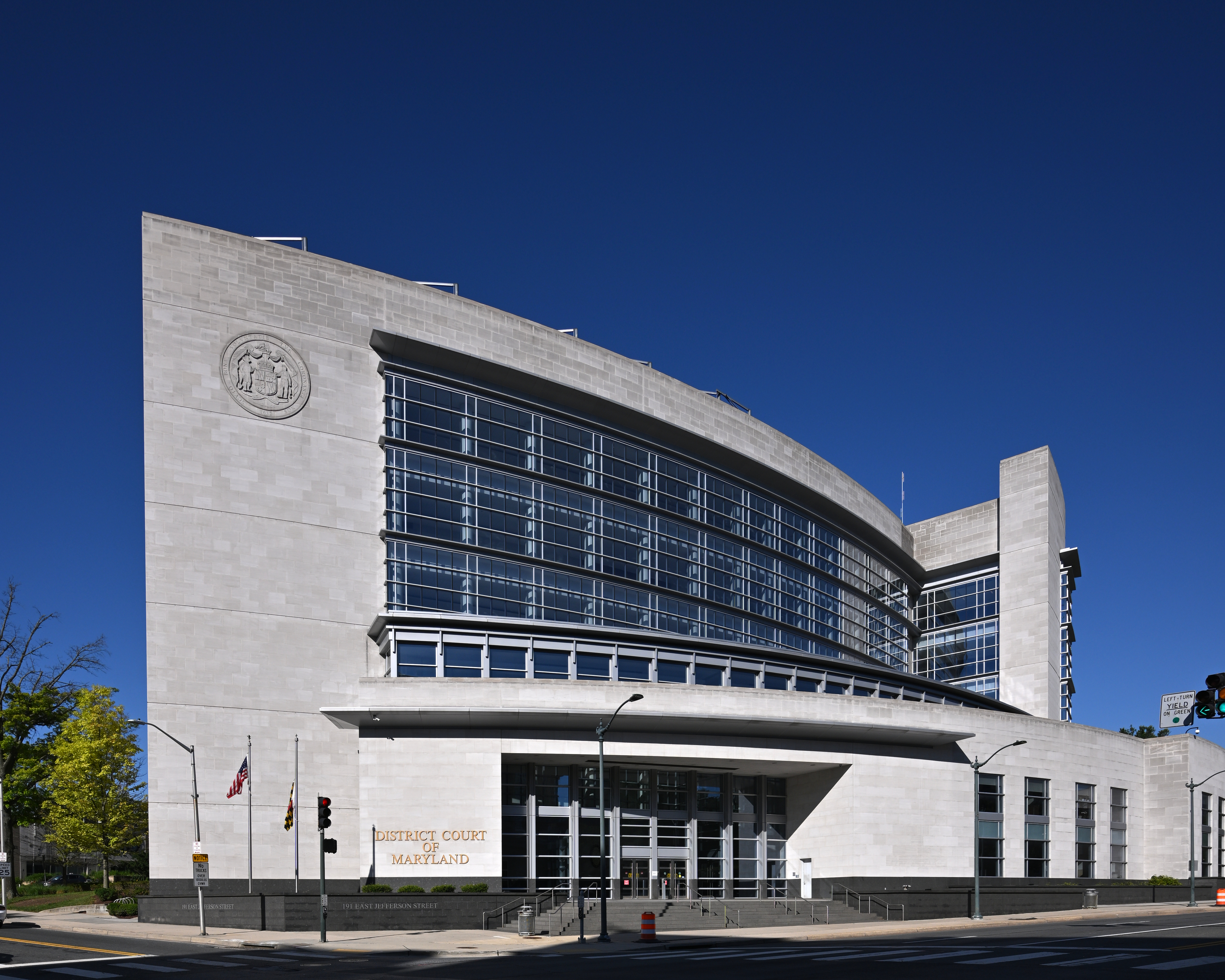
Maryland District Court building, Rockville, MD

The District Court of Maryland is a state lower trial court (court of original jurisdiction) in the state of Maryland. It holds limited jurisdiction over "minor issues," including over all landlord-tenant law cases, replevin actions (the recovery or return of wrongfully taken goods), motor vehicle violations, misdemeanors such as disturbing the peace, and certain felonies. The District Court does not conduct jury trials.

It is a single state court with multiple locations, even though it is typically referred to by the county in which it sits, such as the "Allegany County District Court." The court sits in at least one location in each county, with multiple places of sitting in Baltimore City and some large suburban counties. While counties must typically pay many of the expenses for the local Maryland Circuit Court, the state always pays for the operations of the District Court. There is at least one district judge in each county and in the city of Baltimore.

The court exercises exclusive jurisdiction over civil cases with claims of less than $5,000. It exercises jurisdiction concurrent with the Maryland Circuit Court in civil cases with an amount in controversy between $5,001 and $30,000.

The District Court was created by a state constitutional amendment and came into existence in July 1971 to replace a "hodgepodge" system of local justices of the peace, magistrates, and People's Courts.

Most appeals from District Court are heard by the Circuit Court, although some are heard by the Appellate Court of Maryland and the Supreme Court of Maryland.
