= Joseph M. Getty =

American judge from Maryland (born 1952)

Joseph Getty
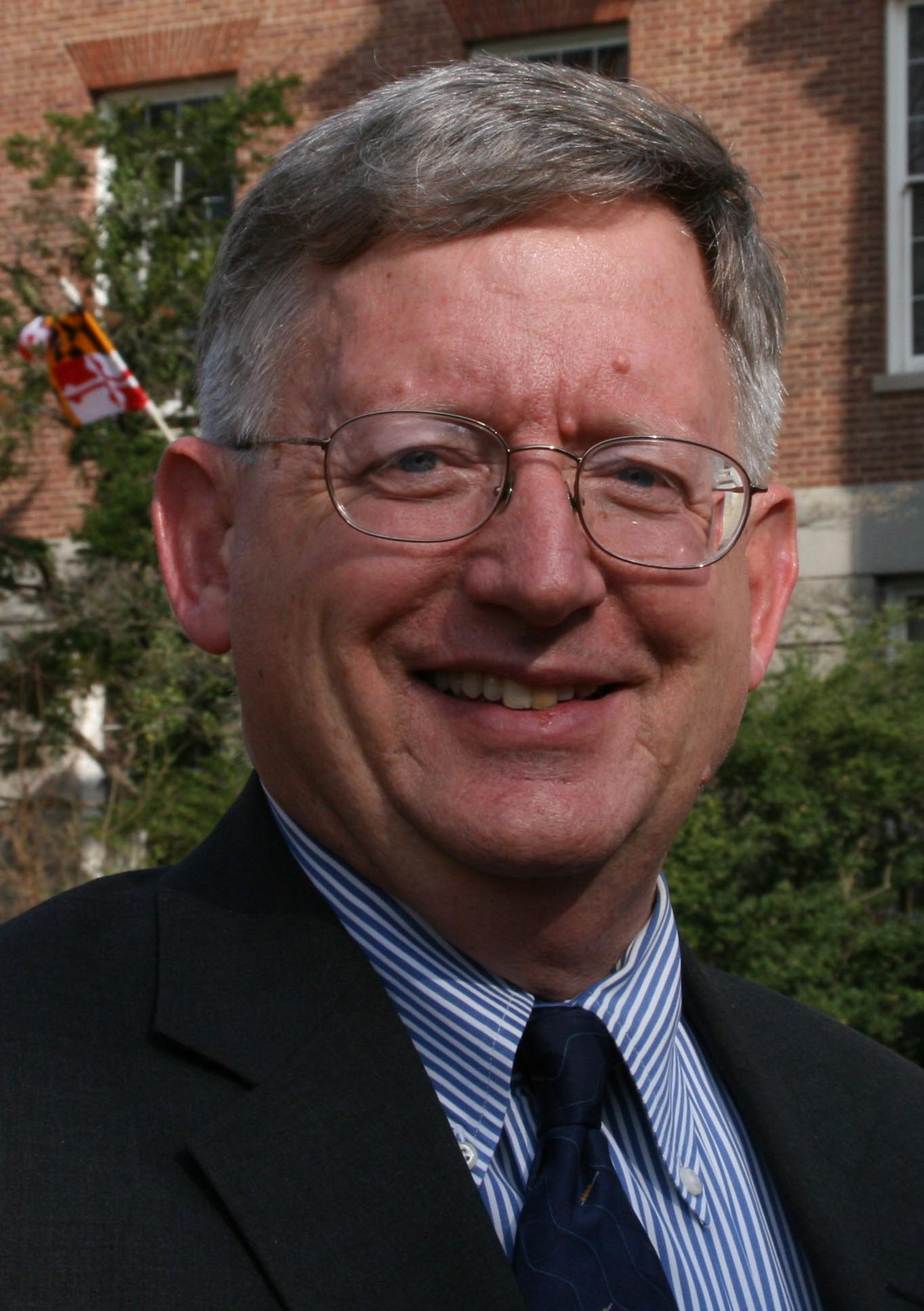

Chief Judge of the Maryland Court of Appeals
- In office September 11, 2021 – April 14, 2022
- Appointed by: Larry Hogan
- Preceded by: Mary Ellen Barbera
- Succeeded by: Matthew J. Fader

Judge of the Maryland Court of Appeals
- In office June 27, 2016 – September 10, 2021
- Appointed by: Larry Hogan
- Preceded by: Lynne A. Battaglia
- Succeeded by: Matthew J. Fader

Member of the Maryland Senate from the 5th district
- In office January 12, 2011 – January 23, 2015
- Preceded by: Larry E. Haines
- Succeeded by: Justin Ready

Member of the Maryland House of Delegates from the 5th district
- In office January 11, 1995 – January 8, 2003
- Preceded by: Richard Matthews; Lawrence LaMotte
- Succeeded by: Wade Kach

Personal details
- Born: April 14, 1952 (age 74) Olney, Maryland, U.S.
- Party: Republican
- Education: Washington College (BA); George Washington University (MA); University of Maryland, Baltimore (JD)

Joseph M. Getty (born April 14, 1952) is the former chief judge of the Supreme Court of Maryland. He was appointed as a judge of that court on June 27, 2016, by Governor Larry Hogan. Effective September 11, 2021, Hogan appointed him as chief judge to replace Mary Ellen Barbera as she reached the mandatory retirement age of 70, an age Getty himself reached after seven months. He was succeeded by Matthew J. Fader.

Getty is a former Republican state senator and delegate representing Maryland's 5th district. In February 2015, then-Senator Getty was appointed by Governor Larry Hogan to his cabinet, as legislative and policy director during his second term as senator. When Getty vacated his seat, he was replaced by former delegate, now Senator Justin Ready. Getty also served in former Governor Bob Ehrlich's cabinet in a similar capacity.

Joe Getty is also a regular contributor to the Northern News, which is a weekly newspaper that distributes to Hampstead, Manchester and Upperco, Maryland. He also previously served as the director of the Historical Society of Carroll County.

He is a graduate of the University of Maryland School of Law.

== Task Force, boards and commissions ==
In 2012, Getty was appointed by Maryland legislative leaders to a task force to study the impact of a Maryland Court of Appeals ruling regarding the liability of owners of pit bulls and landlords that rent to them.

Legal offices
Preceded by Lynne A. Battaglia	Judge of the Maryland Court of Appeals; 2016–2021	Succeeded by Matthew J. Fader
Preceded by Mary Ellen Barbera	Chief Judge of the Maryland Court of Appeals; 2021–2022	Succeeded by Matthew J. Fader
