= Alan M. Wilner =

American judge

Judge of the Maryland Court of Appeals
- In office 1996–2007

Chief Judge of the Maryland Court of Special Appeals
- In office 1990–1996

Judge of the Maryland Court of Special Appeals
- In office 1977–1990

Personal details
- Born: January 26, 1937 (age 88); Baltimore, Maryland, U.S.
- Education: Baltimore City College; Johns Hopkins University (AB, MLA); University of Maryland, Baltimore (JD)

Alan M. Wilner (born January 26, 1937) is an American lawyer and jurist who served as a judge of the Maryland Court of Appeals, the state's highest court, from Baltimore County, Maryland.

== Early life and education ==
Wilner was born in Baltimore, Maryland. He attended Baltimore City College and Johns Hopkins University, receiving a Bachelor of Arts degree in 1958 and a Master of Arts in Liberal Studies degree in 1966. He earned his Juris Doctor from the University of Maryland School of Law in 1962.

== Career ==
Wilner first entered the state court system as a judge on the Court of Special Appeals in 1977. He served on this court until 1990, and was chief judge from November 1990 to November 1996.

In 1996 he was appointed to the Maryland Court of Appeals; he retired in January 2007 on reaching the mandatory retirement age of 70.
