= Mary Ellen Barbera =

American judge (born 1951)

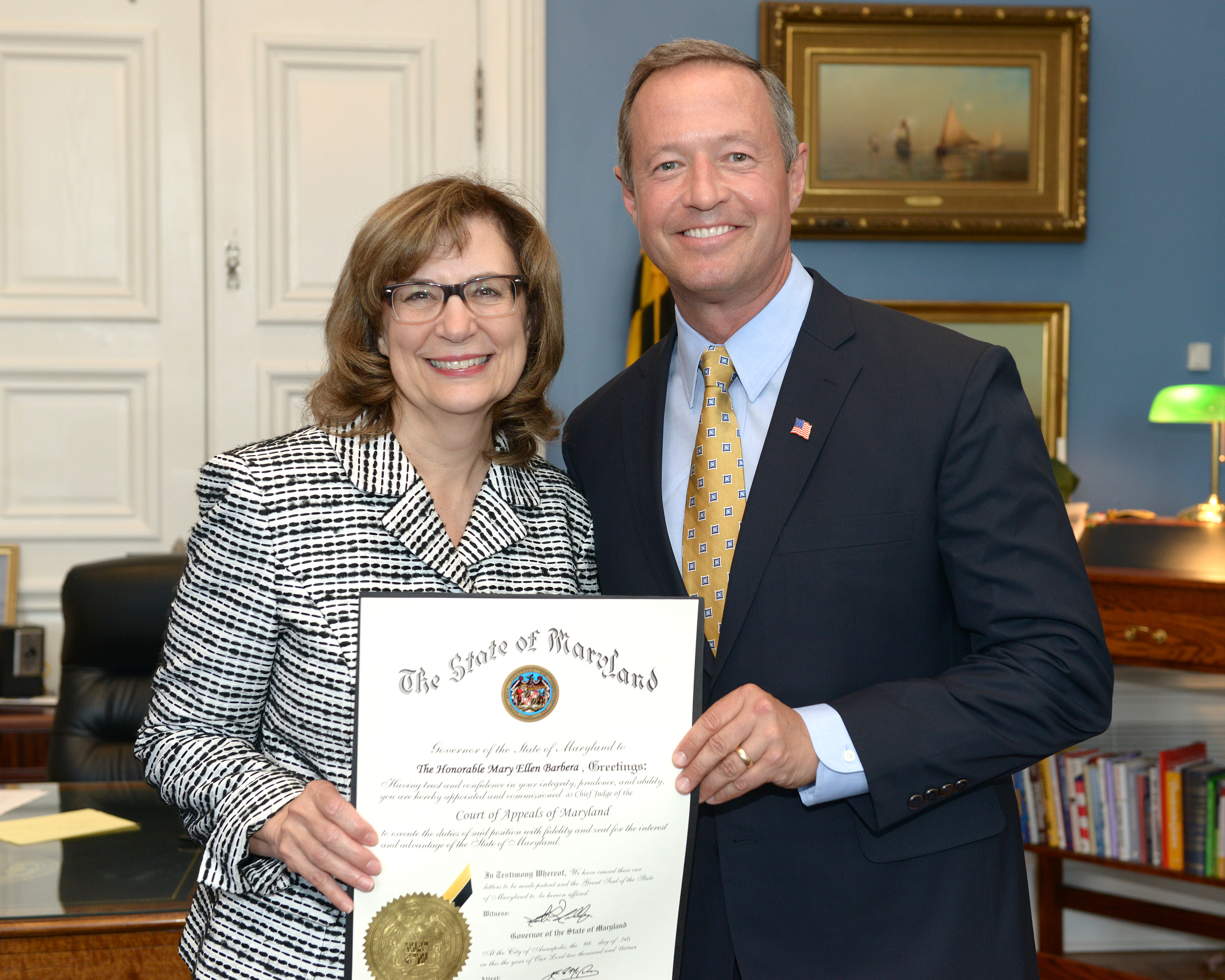
- Barbera (left) sworn in by Martin O'Malley (right)

Chief Judge of the Maryland Court of Appeals
- In office July 3, 2013 – September 10, 2021
- Appointed by: Martin O'Malley
- Preceded by: Robert M. Bell
- Succeeded by: Joseph M. Getty

Personal details
- Born: September 10, 1951 (age 73); Baltimore, Maryland, U.S.
- Education: Towson University (BA); University of Maryland, Baltimore (JD)

Mary Ellen Barbera (born September 10, 1951) is an American lawyer and jurist from Baltimore, Maryland.

== Education ==
In 1975, Barbera earned a bachelor's degree from Towson State College. In 1984, Barbera earned a JD degree from University of Maryland School of Law.

== Career ==
From July 8, 2013 to September 10, 2021, she served as Chief Judge on the Maryland Court of Appeals, (now the Supreme Court of Maryland) the highest court in the state. Until 2008, she served as a judge on the Court of Appeals representing the 7th Appellate Judicial Circuit (Montgomery County). Barbera, a graduate of the University of Maryland School of Law, is the first female Chief Judge of the Maryland Court of Appeals.

Prior to her appointment to the Court of Appeals, she served as an at large judge on Maryland's intermediate appellate court, the Court of Special Appeals, from January 4, 2002 to September 2, 2008. On July 3, 2013, Governor Martin O'Malley appointed Judge Barbera as successor to former Chief Judge Robert M. Bell, who reached the mandatory retirement age of 70. On September 3, 2021, Governor Larry Hogan appointed Judge Joseph M. Getty to succeed Barbera when she reached the mandatory retirement age on September 10, 2021.

== See also ==
- List of female state supreme court justices

Legal offices
| Preceded by Robert M. Bell | Chief Judge of the Maryland Court of Appeals; 2013–2021 | Succeeded by Joseph M. Getty |
