= Lynne A. Battaglia =

American judge

Honorable Lynne A. Battaglia
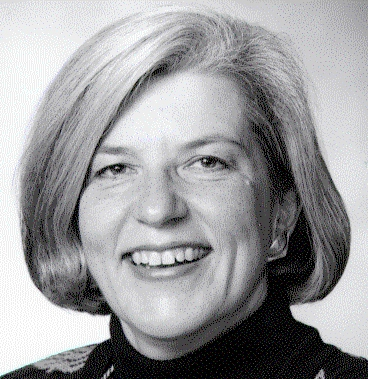

Judge of the Maryland Court of Appeals
- In office January 26, 2001 – April 14, 2016
- Nominated by: Parris Glendening
- Preceded by: Lawrence F. Rodowsky
- Succeeded by: Joseph M. Getty

United States Attorney for the District of Maryland
- In office 1993–2001
- Appointed by: Bill Clinton
- Preceded by: Richard D. Bennett
- Succeeded by: Thomas M. DiBiagio

Personal details
- Born: April 14, 1946 (age 80) Buffalo, New York, U.S.
- Education: American University (BA, MA); University of Maryland School of Law (JD)
- Committees: Public Awareness Committee, 2001-04, Maryland Judicial Conference. Chair, Professionalism Task Force, 2002-03. Chair, Court Commission on Professionalism, 2004-06. Chair, Commission on Professionalism, 2009-Present.

Lynne Ann Battaglia (born April 14, 1946) is an American lawyer and former jurist from Howard County, Maryland. From 2001 to 2016 she served as an associate judge on the Maryland Court of Appeals.

== Background ==
Lynne Ann Battaglia was born on April 14, 1946, in Buffalo, New York. She graduated from American University with a Bachelor of Arts in international relations in 1967 and a Master of Arts in Latin American studies in 1968. She attended Georgetown University to study the American government and later graduated from the University of Maryland School of Law with a Juris Doctor in 1974. She was admitted to the bar that same year. Battaglia was appointed as an associate judge of the Maryland Court of Appeals, the state's highest appellate court, by governor Parris Glendening. She served from 2001 to 2016, when she reached her 70th birthday and mandatorily retired. Formerly, she served as United States Attorney for the District of Maryland and as Chief of Staff to Senator Barbara A. Mikulski. Judge Battaglia chairs the Maryland Professionalism Commission, the Women Lawyers in Maryland project and is an associate professor at the University of Maryland and the University of Baltimore School of Law.

== Judicial career ==
=== Notable opinions ===
- McQuitty v. Spangler, 410 Md. 1 (2009) (informed consent and medical malpractice are distinct theories of negligence and an affirmative physical invasion is not a threshold requirement of an informed consent claim).
- Blackwell v. Wyeth, 408 Md. 575 (2009) (when a novel scientific theory is postulated (that thiomersal in vaccines causes autism), the Frye-Reed general acceptance test applies to each phase of the scientific method; also, when an expert posits a complicated, novel scientific theory, the expert's credentials are subject to closer scrutiny as to whether the area of expertise is appropriate/relevant to the proffered theory).
- Independent Newspapers v. Brodie, 407 Md. 415 (2009) (recommending a five-part test that balances the first amendment right to speak anonymously with right to discover identifying information about individuals who make defamatory remarks on the Internet).
- Anderson v. Gables Condominium, 404 Md. 560 (2008) (holding that provisions of Maryland Condominium Act, generally requiring condominium council of owners to maintain property insurance on "the common elements and units, exclusive of improvements and betterments installed in units by unit owners," and requiring council to repair or replace "[a]ny portion of the condominium damaged or destroyed," do not require a council to insure, against casualty loss, property in an individual condominium unit, or to repair or replace property in an individual condominium unit after a casualty loss.)
- State v. Baby, 404 Md. 220 (pronounced Ba'bee) (2008) (a woman has a right to withdraw consent to sex at any time during intercourse).
- Khalifa v. Shannon, 404 Md. 107 (2008) (recognizing the tort of interference with custody and visitation rights, when mother fled to Egypt with two children never to return, and noting that loss of services was never an element of the substantive common law tort).
- Dept. of Health and Mental Hygiene v. Kelly, 397 Md. 399 (2007) (holding that Department was not authorized to forcibly medicate patient in the absence of a finding that patient was a danger to himself or others while confined at the facility.)
- Clemons v. State, 392 Md. 339 (2007) (holding that conclusory aspects of the comparative bullet lead analysis were not generally accepted in the scientific community and thus, not admissible).
- Rite Aid v. Levy-Gray, 391 Md. 608 (2006) (dealing with notice in products liability suit).
- Newman v. State, 384 Md. 285 (2004) (Defendant may still assert attorney-client privilege to exclude evidence, even when attorney ethically disclosed the confidential information to the judge pursuant to Rule 1.6 of the Rules of Professional Conduct).
- LeJune v. Coin Acceptors, 381 Md. 288 (2004) (inevitable disclosure doctrine would not be adopted as theory for finding threatened future disclosure of trade secrets)
- Hemmings v. Pelham Woods, 375 Md. 522 (2003) (If apartment owner puts up security devices, they must maintain or be liable in tort).
- Wholey v. Sears, 370 Md. 38 (2002) (terminating at-will employment on the grounds that the employee, as a victim or witness, gave testimony at an official proceeding or reported a suspected crime to the appropriate law enforcement or judicial officer is wrongful and contrary to public policy) (Whistleblower case).

=== Notable dissents ===
- Conaway v. Deane, 401 Md. 219 (2007) (Maryland Equal Rights Amendment provides for equal protection, making statute prohibiting same-sex marriages unconstitutional).
- Pringle v. State, 370 Md. 525 (2002) (Majority's holding that the police officers lacked probable cause to arrest the petitioner for possession of cocaine is based primarily upon an erroneous blending of the probable cause standard for an arrest and the sufficiency of evidence standard for a conviction), rev'd 540 U.S. 366 (agreeing with Judge Battaglia and dissent).
