= Supreme Court of Maryland =

Highest court in the U.S. state of Maryland

Coordinates: 38.9852°N 76.501418°W

- Seal of the Supreme Court of Maryland
- Interactive map of Supreme Court of Maryland
- Established: 1776; 250 years ago (as Court of Appeals)
- Jurisdiction: Maryland, United States
- Location: Annapolis, Maryland, U.S.
- Composition method: Appointment by the Governor of Maryland with the advice and consent of the Maryland Senate
- Authorized by: Maryland Constitution
- Appeals to: Supreme Court of the United States
- Judge term length: 10 years (mandatory retirement at the age of 70)
- Number of positions: 7
- Website: Official website

Chief Justice
- Currently: Matthew J. Fader
- Since: April 15, 2022
- Lead position ends: July 23, 2043

The Supreme Court of Maryland (previously the Maryland Court of Appeals) is the highest court of the U.S. state of Maryland. The court, which is composed of one chief justice and six associate justices, meets in the Robert C. Murphy Courts of Appeal Building in the state capital, Annapolis. The term of the Court begins the second Monday of September. The Court is unique among American courts in that the justices wear red robes.

== History ==
Seal as the Court of Appeals.

As the highest tribunal in Maryland, the Court of Appeals was created by Article 56 of the Maryland Constitution of 1776. The Court was to be "composed of persons of integrity and sound judgment in the law, whose judgment shall be final and conclusive in all cases of appeal, from the general court, court of chancery, and court of admiralty". With counsel, advice and consent, the Governor appointed all of the judges. Five judges were commissioned in 1778, but that number was reduced to three in 1801. The Court was restructured in 1806 by dividing the State into six judicial districts with a chief judge and two associate judges for each district appointed by the Governor and Council. Together, these six chief judges constituted the Court of Appeals which began to sit on the Eastern Shore at Easton as well as on the Western Shore at the State capital.

The Maryland Constitution of 1851 divided the State into four judicial districts. Voters of each district elected a judge to the Court of Appeals for a ten-year term. The Court became responsible solely for appellate duties and sat only at Annapolis, whereas before it sat in various locations throughout the State. Five judges, each elected from one of five judicial districts, were prescribed by the Maryland Constitution of 1864.

The Maryland Constitution of 1867 (currently in effect) returned to the older form of requiring Court of Appeals judges to assume trial court and appellate duties. In seven judicial circuits, the Governor, with Senate advice and consent, designated a chief judge. In the eighth judicial circuit in Baltimore, the voters elected the chief judge. These eight chief judges then constituted the Court of Appeals.

Judicial reorganization in 1943 provided for a five-member Court of Appeals elected for terms of fifteen years. The five judges included two from Baltimore City and one each from three appellate judicial circuits. In 1960, the number of judges was increased to the present-day seven. Until 1994, there was one from each of the first five Appellate Judicial Circuits and two from the Sixth Appellate Judicial Circuit (Baltimore), but a Constitutional amendment realigned the circuits to create seven circuits with one judge from each. Since 1975, the Court of Appeals has heard cases almost exclusively by way of certiorari. As a result, the Court's formerly excessive workload has been reduced to a more manageable level, thus allowing the Court to devote more time to the most important and far-reaching issues.

Maryland was formerly one of only two states whose highest judicial body was called a "Court of Appeals" rather than a "Supreme Court," along with the New York Court of Appeals. (Note: Additionally, the highest court in the District of Columbia is the District of Columbia Court of Appeals. The Oklahoma Court of Criminal Appeals and Texas Court of Criminal Appeals are the highest courts for criminal matters in their respective states, which use the term "Supreme Court" for their highest courts that hear civil matters.) In the 2022 general election held on November 8, 2022, voters approved a constitutional amendment to change the name of the court to the "Supreme Court of Maryland", and the title of its judges to "Justice." The same amendment also renamed the intermediate appellate court from the Court of Special Appeals to the Appellate Court of Maryland. The new names became effective on December 14, 2022.

== Functions ==
As Maryland's highest court, the Supreme Court of Maryland reviews cases of both major and minor importance. Throughout the year, the Supreme Court of Maryland holds hearings on the adoption or amendment of rules of practice and procedure. It also supervises the Attorney Grievance Commission and State Board of Law Examiners in attorney disciplinary and admission matters. The Chief Justice of the Supreme Court of Maryland, designated by the Governor, is the constitutional administrative head of the Maryland judicial system.

Cases typically come before the Supreme Court of Maryland on a petition for a writ of certiorari to the Appellate Court of Maryland. The court can decline the petition, and refuse to hear the case, or it can grant the "cert," and hear the appeal. The justices sometimes decide to hear an appeal before the lower appellate court has heard the case. This is known as the Court 'granting certiorari on its own motion', or 'reaching down'. In this instance, the writ of certiorari is issued to the trial court, rather than to the Appellate Court of Maryland (Maryland's intermediate appellate court, or appellate court of right). The procedural framework for seeking review is set out in Maryland Rule 8-301, which also provides for exceptions to the cert petition requirement, such as direct appeals in limited circumstances governed by other statutes.

The court does not sit in panels; all seven justices sit on each case (en banc) unless there is a disqualification, in which event a judge from another court, or a retired appellate judge, may be specially assigned to sit in the place of the disqualified justice. In practice, almost all cases are heard by seven justices, though a quorum for the court is five justices.

While it is generally an appellate court and hears most cases on appeal, the Supreme Court of Maryland has exclusive jurisdiction over certain matters, such as legislative redistricting, removal of certain officers, and certification of questions of law. Additionally, it had exclusive jurisdiction in death penalty appeals prior to the abolition of capital punishment in Maryland.

The Supreme Court of Maryland likewise retains original jurisdiction to discipline all attorneys admitted to the practice of law in Maryland. It can impose penalties ranging from reprimands to the ultimate punishment, disbarment.

== Justices ==
=== Appointment and qualifications ===
The seven justices of the Supreme Court of Maryland are appointed by the Governor of Maryland with Senate consent. They serve ten-year terms. However, note that the ballot for re-election says only 'for continuance in office'. I.e. there is no opposing candidate.

The justices of the court are required to be citizens of and qualified voters in Maryland. Prior to their appointment, they must have lived in Maryland for at least five years, and must have lived for at least six months in the appellate judicial circuit from which they are appointed. They must be at least thirty years of age at the time of appointment, and must have been admitted to practice law in Maryland. Appointees should be "most distinguished for integrity, wisdom and sound legal knowledge."

After initial appointment by the Governor and confirmation by the Senate, members of the court, at the first general election occurring at least one year after their appointment, run for continuance in office on their records without opposition. If the voters reject the retention in office of a justice, or the vote is tied, the office becomes vacant. Otherwise, the incumbent justice is retained in office for a ten-year term. This requirement of voter approval is similar to provisions in the Missouri Plan, a non-partisan method for selecting judges which is used by 11 states. Like all Maryland judges, members of the Supreme Court of Maryland must retire by their 70th birthday.

There is one justice from each of the state's seven Judicial Circuits. Each justice is required to be a resident of his or her respective circuit. The circuits are currently as follows:

Maryland Judicial Circuits
Circuit	Counties
1	Caroline, Cecil, Dorchester, Kent, Queen Anne's, Somerset, Talbot, Wicomico, and Worcester counties
2	Baltimore County and Harford County
3	Allegany, Carroll, Frederick, Garrett, Howard, and Washington counties
4	Prince George's County
5	Anne Arundel, Calvert, Charles, and St. Mary's counties
6	Baltimore
7	Montgomery County

=== Current justices ===
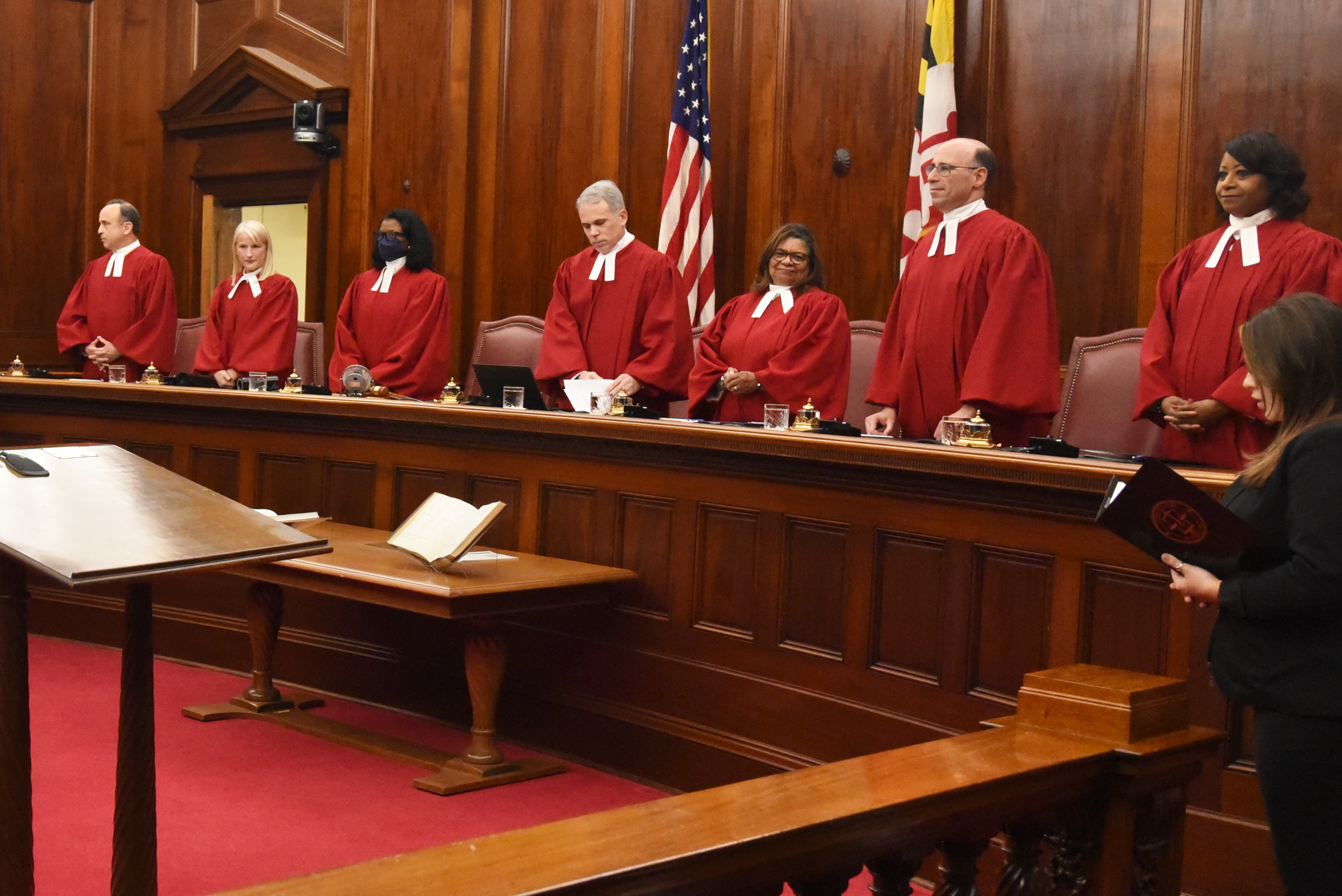
Justices of the Supreme Court of Maryland, 2023

Unlike most other American federal, state, and local courts, the justices on the Supreme Court of Maryland wear red robes and with white cross-collars, reminiscent of British court dress. Judges at all other levels of the Maryland judiciary wear the more customary black robes. In 2025, Supreme Court justices began wearing black robes for most oral arguments, with the red robes reserved for special occasions.

Circuit	Name	Born	Start	Term ends	Mandatory retirement (Note: Justices must retire by the age of 70.)	Appointer	Law school
3	Matthew J. Fader, Chief Justice	1973 (age 52–53)	April 15, 2022	2034	2043	Larry Hogan (R)	Yale
6	Shirley M. Watts	1959 (age 66–67)	July 31, 2013	2034	2029	Martin O'Malley (D)	Rutgers
1	Brynja M. Booth	1972 (age 53–54)	April 18, 2019	2030	2042	Larry Hogan (R)	W&L
5	Jonathan Biran	1966 (age 59–60)	December 16, 2019	2030	2036	Larry Hogan (R)	Stanford
7	Steven B. Gould	1966 (age 59–60)	September 11, 2021	2032	2036	Larry Hogan (R)	BU
2	Angela M. Eaves	1959 (age 66–67)	April 12, 2022	2034	2029	Larry Hogan (R)	Texas
4	Peter Killough	1960 (age 65–66)	July 31, 2024	2036	2030	Wes Moore (D)	Virginia

=== Senior justices ===
Justices of the Supreme Court of Maryland who no longer wish to work full time, or wish to have more control over their schedules, may become senior justices and be appointed to hear cases if: they were not removed or involuntarily retired from the bench, they did not leave the bench for reason of disability, they did not leave the bench because they lost an election or did not gain Senate confirmation, they were not censured by the Supreme Court of Maryland upon recommendation of the Commission on Judicial Disabilities, and they do not engage in the practice of law.

Name	Born	Ended active service	Designation ends (Note: Senior justices are designated to three-year, renewable terms. All terms end on June 30 of the year listed.)	Appointer	Law school
Alan M. Wilner	1937 (age 88–89)	January 26, 2007	2027	Parris Glendening (D)	Maryland
Irma S. Raker	1938 (age 87–88)	April 24, 2008	2027	William Donald Schaefer (D)	American
Glenn T. Harrell Jr.	1945 (age 80–81)	June 26, 2015	2027	Parris Glendening (D)	Maryland
Lynne A. Battaglia	1946 (age 79–80)	April 14, 2016	2027	Parris Glendening (D)	Maryland
Robert N. McDonald	1952 (age 73–74)	February 23, 2022	2028	Martin O'Malley (D)	Harvard
Joseph M. Getty	1952 (age 73–74)	April 14, 2022	2028	Larry Hogan (R)	Maryland

== See also ==
- Courts of Maryland
- Government of Maryland
- Appellate Court of Maryland
