= Appellate Court of Maryland =

Maryland's intermediate appellate court

- Established: 1966
- Location: Annapolis, Maryland, United States
- Composition method: Appointment by the Governor of Maryland
- Authorised by: Md. Courts and Judicial Proceedings Code Ann. § 1-401
- Number of positions: 15

Chief Judge
- Currently: E. Gregory Wells
- Since: April 15, 2022

The Appellate Court of Maryland is the intermediate appellate court for the U.S. state of Maryland. Formerly known as the Maryland Court of Special Appeals, it was created in 1966 in response to the rapidly growing caseload in the Supreme Court of Maryland. Like the state's highest court, the tribunal meets in the Robert C. Murphy Courts of Appeal Building in the state capital, Annapolis.

The Appellate Court of Maryland originally could hear only criminal cases. However, its jurisdiction has expanded so that it now considers any reviewable judgment, decree, order, or other action of the circuit and orphans’ courts, unless otherwise provided by law. Appeals to the Appellate Court are typically initiated by the filing of a Notice of Appeal in accordance with Maryland Rule 8-201. Judges sitting on the Appellate Court of Maryland generally hear and decide cases in panels of three. In some instances, however, all 15 judges may listen to a case, known as an en banc hearing.

A ballot proposal in the 2022 general election asked Maryland voters whether to change the court's name from the Maryland Court of Special Appeals to the Appellate Court of Maryland. The measure was approved by 74.2% of voters on November 8, 2022. It changed to this name on December 14, 2022.

== Judges ==
=== Appointment and qualifications ===
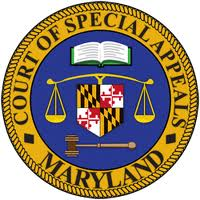
Seal as the Court of Special Appeals.

The fifteen judges of the Appellate Court of Maryland are appointed by the Governor of Maryland with Senate consent. They serve ten-year terms.

The Judges of the court are required to be citizens of and qualified voters in Maryland. Prior to their appointment, they must have resided in Maryland for at least five years, and for at least six months in the appellate judicial circuit from which they are appointed. They must be at least thirty years of age at the time of appointment, and must have been admitted to practice law in Maryland. Appointees should be "most distinguished for integrity, wisdom and sound legal knowledge."

After initial appointment by the Governor and confirmation by the Senate, members of the court, at the first general election occurring at least one year after their appointment, run for continuance in office on their records without opposition. If the voters reject the retention in office of a judge, or the vote is tied, the office becomes vacant. Otherwise, the incumbent judge is retained in office for a ten-year term. This requirement of voter approval is similar to provisions of the Missouri Plan, a non-partisan method for selecting judges which is used by 11 states.

There are eight at large judges and one judge from each of the state's seven Judicial Circuits; the latter are required to be a resident of his or her respective circuit. The circuits are currently as follows:

Maryland Judicial Circuits
| Circuit | Counties |
|---|---|
| 1 | Caroline, Cecil, Dorchester, Kent, Queen Anne's, Somerset, Talbot, Wicomico, and Worcester counties |
| 2 | Baltimore County and Harford County |
| 3 | Allegany, Carroll, Frederick, Garrett, Howard, and Washington counties |
| 4 | Prince George's County |
| 5 | Anne Arundel, Calvert, Charles, and St. Mary's counties |
| 6 | Baltimore |
| 7 | Montgomery County |

=== Current judges ===
| Circuit | Name | Born | Start | Term Ends | Mandatory Retirement (Note: Judges must retire by the age of 70.) | Appointer | Law School |
|---|---|---|---|---|---|---|---|
| At-large | Gregory Wells, Chief Judge | June 28, 1961 (age 65) | April 18, 2019 | 2030 | 2031 | Larry Hogan (R) | UVA |
| 3rd | Kathryn Grill Graeff | February 7, 1961 (age 65) | September 2, 2008 | 2030 | 2031 | Martin O'Malley (D) | UMD |
| At-large | Stuart Berger | 1959 (age 66–67) | January 25, 2012 | 2032 | 2029 | Martin O'Malley (D) | Baltimore |
| 2nd | Douglas Nazarian | October 30, 1966 (age 60) | January 8, 2013 | 2034 | 2036 | Martin O'Malley (D) | Duke |
| At-large | Kevin Arthur | October 25, 1958 (age 68) | March 18, 2014 | 2034 | 2028 | Martin O'Malley (D) | UMD |
| At-large | Andrea Leahy | May 23, 1961 (age 65) | March 18, 2014 | 2034 | 2031 | Martin O'Malley (D) | American |
| 6th | Michael Reed | August 14, 1960 (age 66) | March 18, 2014 | 2034 | 2030 | Martin O'Malley (D) | GWU |
| At-large | Daniel Friedman | August 27, 1965 (age 61) | September 23, 2014 | 2026 | 2035 | Martin O'Malley (D) | UMD |
| 4th | Melanie Shaw | 1957 (age 68–69) | June 20, 2016 | 2028 | 2027 | Larry Hogan (R) | UMD |
| At-large | Terrence Zic | April 24, 1961 (age 65) | November 10, 2020 | 2032 | 2031 | Larry Hogan (R) | Georgetown |
| 5th | Laura Ripken | 1964 (age 61–62) | January 17, 2021 | 2032 | 2034 | Larry Hogan (R) | Catholic |
| 7th | Rosalyn Tang | 1980 (age 45–46) | March 3, 2022 | 2032 | 2050 | Larry Hogan (R) | SMU |
| At-large | Anne Albright | 1961 (age 64–65) | April 20, 2022 | 2034 | 2031 | Larry Hogan (R) | Georgetown |
| 1st | Stephen Kehoe | 1958 (age 67–68) | April 11, 2024 | 2034 | 2028 | Wes Moore (D) | CWRU |
| At-large | Kendra Young Ausby | July 16, 1971 (age 55) | October 7, 2026 | 2028 | 2041 | Wes Moore (D) | Baltimore |

== See also ==
- Courts of Maryland
