= Marie de Ford Keller =

American painter

- Born: 1860; Germany
- Died: 1962 (aged 101–102); Baltimore, Maryland

Marie de Ford Keller (1860 – 1962) was an American artist known for her portraiture.

Keller was born in 1860 in Germany. She studied at the Art Students League of New York. Keller died in Baltimore in 1962.

Her work is in the Maryland State Art Collection of the Maryland State Archives. She created a series of portraits of prominent Maryland judges including Richard H. Alvey, James Lawrence Bartol, Andrew Hunter Boyd, Richard Bowie, Samuel Claggett Chew, Thomas Beale Dorsey, Philip Barton Key, John Carroll LeGrand, James Alfred Pearce, and John Mitchell Robinson. Her portrait of Louis B. Kohn is owned by the Maryland Historical Society.
