= Sappington (disambiguation) =

Sappington may refer to:

== Places ==
- Sappington, Missouri
  - Joseph Sappington House, house in Missouri
  - William B. Sappington House, house in Missouri
  - Sappington Cemetery State Historic Site, historic site in Missouri

== People ==
- Courtney Sappington, American politician from Kansas
- Francis Brown Sappington (died c. 1839), American politician and physician from Maryland
- John Sappington (1776-1856), American physician
- John S. Marmaduke (1833-1887), American governor of Missouri
- John Sappington (Maryland politician) (1847–1905), American physician and politician
- Marc Sappington (born 1978), American spree killer
- Margo Sappington (born 1947), American choreographer
- Richard F. Sappington (1861–1930), American politician from Maryland
- Thomas Sappington (died 1857), American politician from Maryland

== Other ==
- Sappington Formation, geologic formation in Montana
