= James McSherry =

James McSherry may refer to:

- James McSherry Jr. (1819–1869), lawyer and author
- James McSherry (Maryland judge) (1842–1907), Chief Judge of the Maryland Court of Appeals, son of James McSherry, Jr
- James McSherry (Pennsylvania politician) (1776–1849), Congressional Representative from Pennsylvania
