= McSherry =

McSherry is a surname, and may refer to:

- Clayton McSherry (born 1991), Best Person Award Recipient (2010)
- Bernadette McSherry (born 1961), Australian lawyer, academic, and writer
- Chic McSherry (born 1958), Scottish musician and businessman
- Diana McSherry (born 1945), American computer scientist and biophysicist
- Frank McSherry, American computer scientist
- G. X. McSherry (1924–2013), American farmer and politician
- James McSherry Jr. (1819–1869), American lawyer and author
- James McSherry (Maryland judge) (1842–1907), American jurist
- James McSherry (Pennsylvania politician) (1776–1849), American politician
- Jim McSherry (born 1952), Scottish football player
- John McSherry (1944–1996), American umpire in Major League
- John McSherry, Irish uillean piper who has played with Lúnasa and Coolfin
- J. Patrice McSherry, professor of political science at Long Island University
- Laurel McSherry, American artist
- Paul McSherry, guitarist from Northern Ireland
- Richard McSherry (1817–1885), American physician
- William McSherry (1799–1839), American Jesuit and president of Georgetown University
- Virginia Faulkner McSherry (1845-1916), American non-profit executive
