= Judge Robb =

Judge Robb may refer to:

- Charles Henry Robb (1867–1939), associate justice of the United States Court of Appeals for the District of Columbia
- Roger Robb (1907–1985), judge of the United States Court of Appeals for the District of Columbia Circuit

== See also ==
- Clair E. Robb (1905–1965), justice of the Kansas Supreme Court
