= Alexander McIlhenny =

American military officer, farmer (1778–1835)

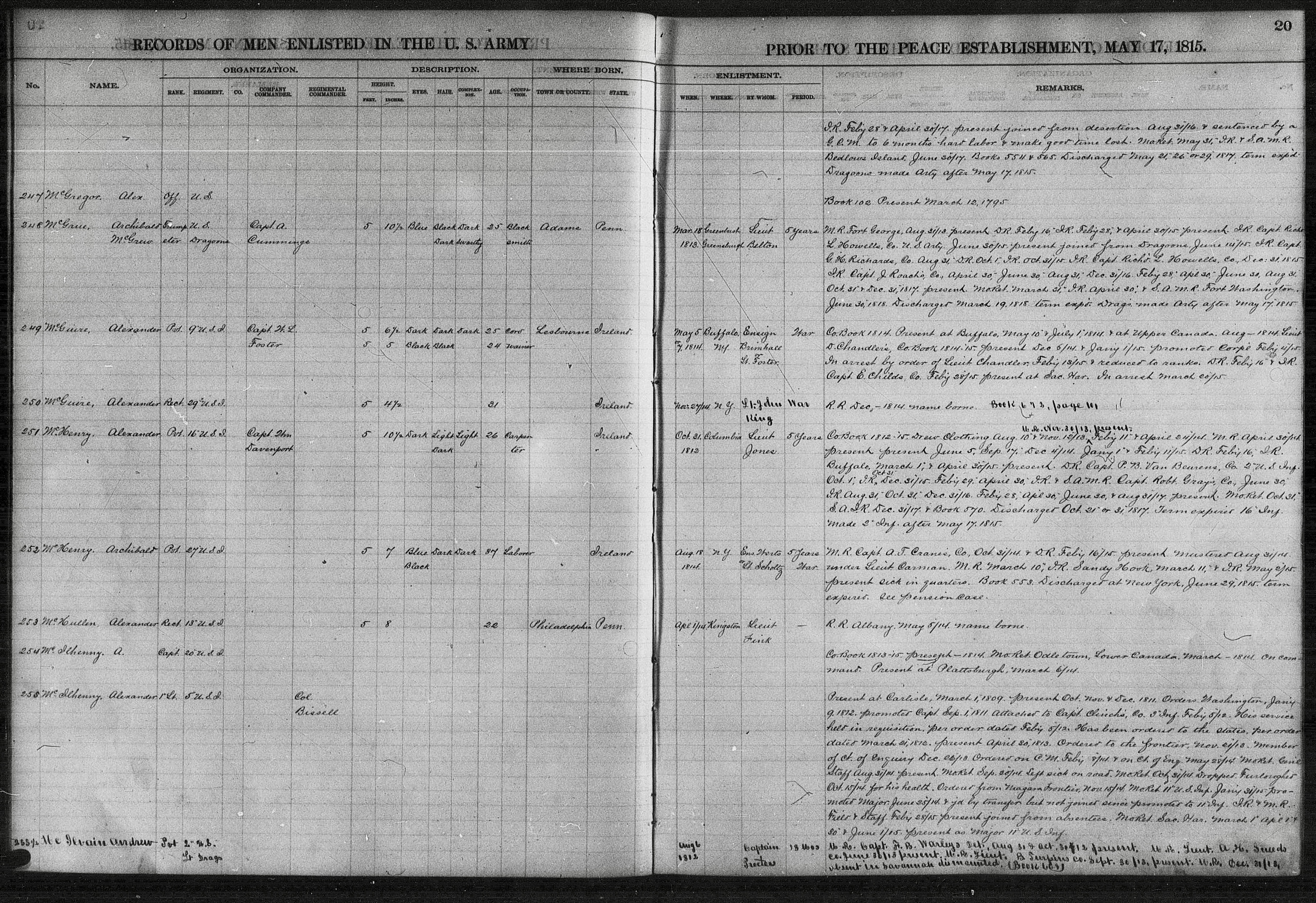
- Entry for Alexander McIlhenny in the ledger of "men enlisted in the U.S. Army prior to the peace establishment May 17, 1815"

Member of the Maryland House of Delegates from the Frederick County district
- In office 1826–1826 Serving with Samuel Barnes, John C. Cockey, William P. Farquhar, Thomas Sappington
- Preceded by: Samuel Barnes, John C. Cockey, William P. Farquhar, Thomas Sappington
- Succeeded by: Nicholas Holtz, David Kemp, Isaac Shriver, Francis Thomas

Personal details
- Born: November 10, 1778 Adams County, Pennsylvania
- Died: January 25, 1835 (aged 56) Near Uniontown, Carroll County, Maryland, United States
- Occupation: Military officer, legislator, lawyer, justice of the peace/judge, farmer, etc.

Alexander McIlhenny (November 10, 1778 – January 25, 1835) was an American military officer, Maryland state legislator, occasional federal judge (?), farmer, and diarist. He served as chief of staff to brigadier general Daniel Bissell during the War of 1812. McIlhenny represented Frederick County in the Maryland House of Delegates in 1826. During the fraught 1828 U.S. presidential election McIlhenny wrote a public letter describing his recollection of an Andrew Jackson scandal that occurred during their military service in colonial-territorial Mississippi. He served as a justice of the peace and did legal work in his community (executing deeds, etc.), and was seemingly impressed into sitting as a judge in cases before the U.S. circuit court in Baltimore in 1830. McIlhenny's preserved diaries describe his career, family life, and the society and economy of Maryland and southern Pennsylvania during the early 19th century.

== Early life and career ==
Alexander McIlhenny was a grandson of Ezekiel McIlhenny, one of four immigrant brothers (Robert, Ezekiel, John, and Alexander McIlhenny), Scots by heritage, who immigrated from northern Ireland to southeast Pennsylvania around 1745. There was a McIlhenny homestead built along the banks of Conewago Creek in 1767 that stood until it was destroyed by a house fire in 1900. Alexander's father was James McIlhenny, eldest son of Ezekiel. James McIlhenny was a tanner by trade, and lived "on the old homestead" in Mount Joy Township in what was then York County and is now Adams County. Alexander McIlhenny was born in November 1778, the oldest of James McIlhenny's nine children. According to a schoolteacher and lifelong resident of north-central Maryland named Ella Beam, writing in 1914, "In my childhood the Major's life-size portrait in oil hung in the living room at the residence of his daughter Mrs. [Elizabeth] Ross Mcllhenny Danner, Uniontown, Md...I remember the portrait as that of a handsome man in uniform, with dark hair and expressive, dark eyes. It had a heavy gilt frame and hung in a recess. A large easy chair under this picture was the accustomed seat of Mrs. Mcllhenny...I am told that the Major's portrait now hangs in Masonic Hall, Westminster, Md."

Alexander McIlhenny seems to have worked as a farmer before he joined the U.S. Army from Pennsylvania on June 18, 1808, initially serving as a first lieutenant in the 5th Infantry. He was promoted to captain in September 1811. He was then promoted to brigade major to brigadier general Daniel Bissell in 1814, and promoted again to Major of the 11th Infantry on June 25, 1814, unit disbanded on June 15, 1815. The title brigade major is no longer used in the United States Army but during this era, brigadier majors were the key members of a brigadier general's staff. The equivalent title today would be chief of staff. The general and major were typically assisted by several aides-de-camp, as well as a brigade inspector, brigade subinspector, brigade quartermaster, wagon master, and chaplain. According to John J. McGrath of the Combat Studies Institute at Fort Leavenworth, Kansas, during the War of 1812, there were approximately 12 brigadier-generals in the U.S. Army at any one time.

On November 27, 1816, the Adams Centinel newspaper published a notice of McIlhenny's marriage: "Maj. Alexander McIlhenny (late U.S. Army) and Elizabeth Reid of Runny Meade, Frederick Co., MD., married on the 19th, by Rev. Patrick Davidson." Reid was said to have been "one of the belles of Annapolis." According to the 1919 McIlhenny genealogy they had nine children together. According to more recent scholarship, they had just one daughter, Elizabeth Ross (1817–1898). McIlhenny's Maryland journals show that they had at least two slaves as of 1817, Polly and her child, and were friendly with Maryland families like the Taneys and the Keys, to whom Elizabeth Reid McIlhenny was kin by marriage. McIlhenny's life seems to have been both secure and content. Some of the activities he recorded were ordering a clock, making currant wine, and sitting "by a fire with comfort." McIlhenny's purchase of a clockworks from Eli Bentley for $60 plus $40 to cabinetmaker George Christ for a case "was a huge investment at the time—an indication of McIlhenny's wealth."

In 1820, McIlhenny served as Grand Warden of a Masonic lodge in Maryland. In 1826 he was elected, along with four others, to represent Frederick County, Maryland in the Maryland House of Delegates. He also "had a long career as a Justice of the Peace."

== 1828 U.S. presidential election ==
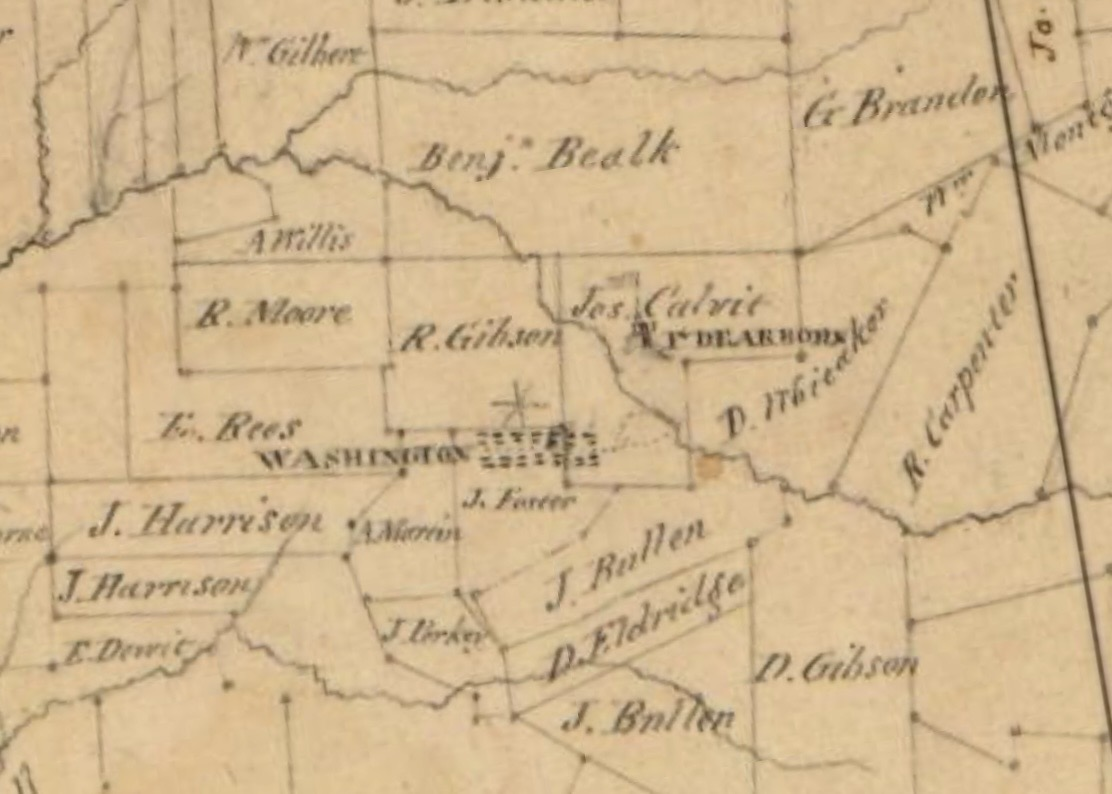
Plantations in the vicinity of Washington, the capital of Mississippi Territory, and Fort Dearborn, on an 1810 map of Adams County

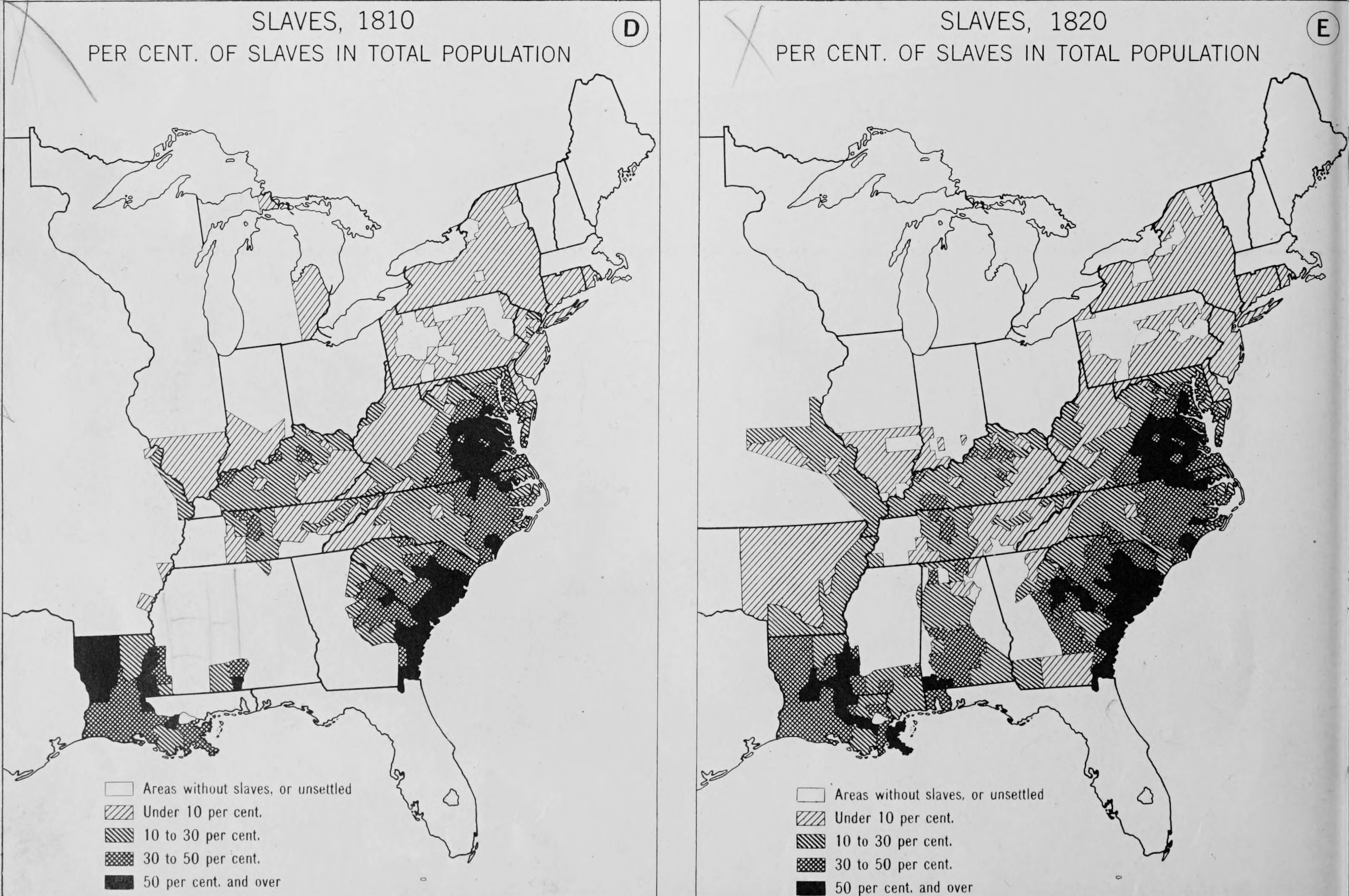
Percent of slaves in total population, 1810 and 1820

In summer 1828, during the course of the presidential campaign, a controversy broke out over whether or not candidate Andrew Jackson, while in the course of transporting slaves through the Choctaw Nation without the necessary identity documents, had physically threatened a federal agent for doing his job. According to news reports, "It is notorious, that he (Gen. Jackson) did not take a passport; but when he approached the Agency, he armed his negroes with axes, hired some half breed Indians with their arms—marched by the agency in military order, himself at their head with the cap of his holsters thrown back, and his rifle cocked. Mr. Dinsmore was absent and no passport was required, and the General had no occasion to use his fire arms. But he thus set at defiance a wise and salutary regulation, designed for the protection of Slave holders in this and the adjoining States." This incident was surfaced in part because it was additional evidence for the claim that Andrew Jackson had been a professional slave trader. The editor of the Frederick Examiner newspaper vouched for McIlhenny, writing, "Major Mclhenny is well known to, and much esteemed by, the citizens of Frederick County, and was one of their representatives in the legislature in the session of 1826. He is a gentleman of unimpeachable veracity, and his testimony will not be doubted by any man who values his own respectability. It will be seen by the letter, that he bore a military command in the service of his country, and we know that his conduct in that service obtained the warmest commendations of his brother officers. The most implicit confidence may, therefore, he given to his statement." McIlhenny's immediate superior during the War of 1812, Daniel Bissell, had been commander at Fort Massac during the unraveling of the Burr conspiracy of 1806 and had interacted with Andrew Jackson when Jackson "exceeded his authority in ordering Captain Bissell of the regular army at Fort Massac to stop all armed boats."

The incident continues to be examined by Jacksonian scholars studying the future president's sense of privilege and entitlement, as Jackson reportedly claimed that "an American citizen did not need any permission to cross through Indian country" and that "a U.S. citizen required only 'an honest face and a good reputation' to pass by."

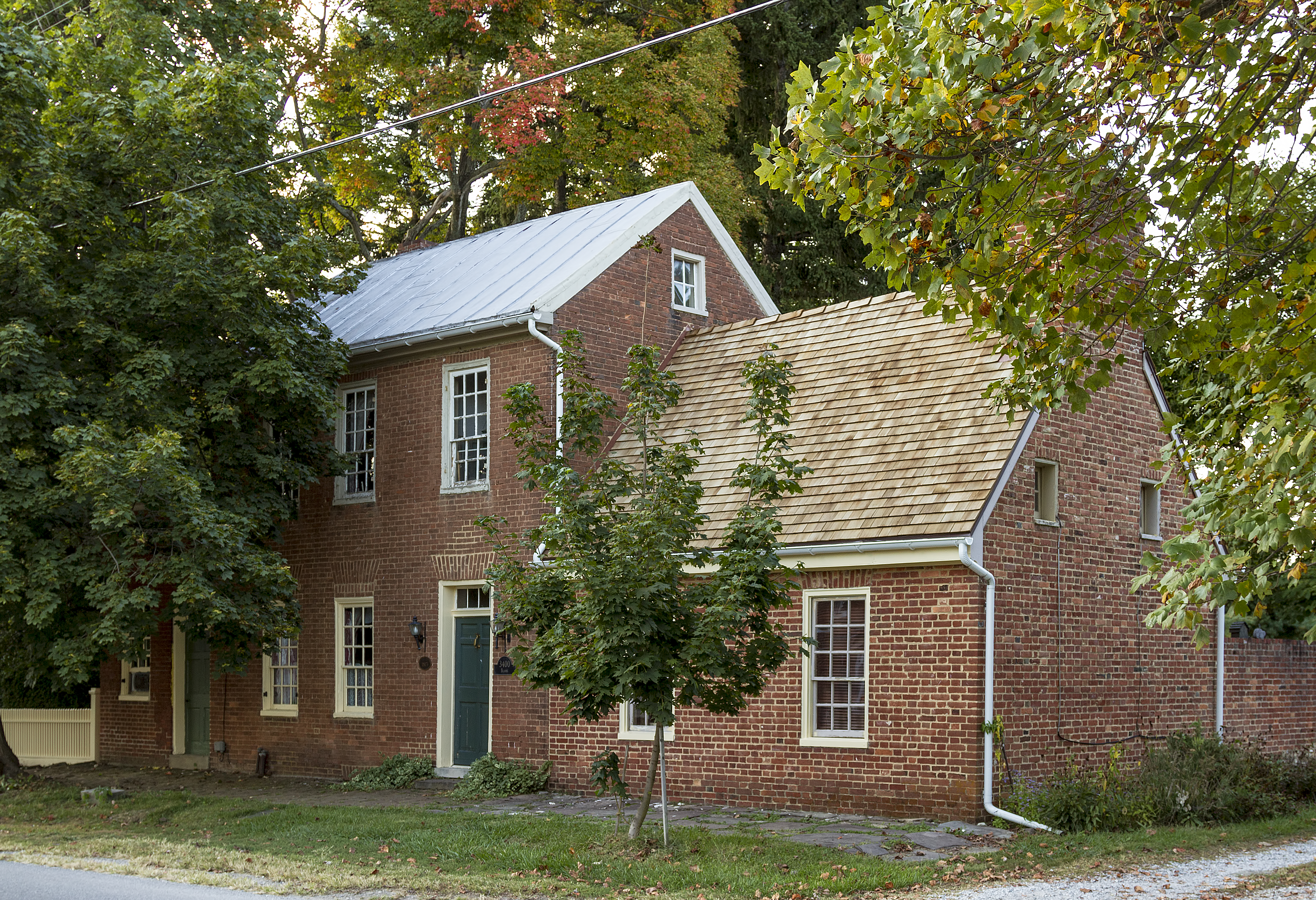
A Federal-period brick residence in Maryland's Uniontown Historic District (2013)

McIlhenny, writing from his home near Union-Town, Maryland on May 28, 1828, described an incident that had taken place in approximately January 1812 along the Natchez Trace, at the Choctaw Agency, in what were then unceded Choctaw lands, in what is now Madison County, Mississippi. McIlhenny's account began with an endorsement of the incumbent candidate, John Quincy Adams, and arguing that Jackson enthusiasts were "totally unacquainted" with Jackson's "qualifications, temper and habits of life." In 1811, McIlhenny had been stationed at Washington Cantonment (Fort Dearborn) in Mississippi Territory, and "Gen. Jackson spent three or four days in our Cantonment in quarters with Col. Purdy, who commanded a battalion of the 7th Regiment infantry, from Tennessee. The General was then a militia officer, and during his stay was exceedingly attentive to our drills." Later, explained McIlhenny, while he was socializing in Washington, the Mississippi territorial capital, "in company with Cowles Meade [sic], Speaker of the House of Delegates, Silas Dismore, Choctaw Agent, and several of my brother officers" the conversation turned to the "good effects" of the passport system, such that territorial legislators present made a point to carry and present them, since the system had resulted in the successful arrest of "deserters from the army, runaway negroes, kidnappers, horse-thieves, and many others, fugitives from justice."

According to McIlhenny, Dinsmoor then volunteered an anecdote:

Gen. Jackson, who he said, IN PASSING DOWN WITH A DROVE OF NEGROES, halted at the Agency to refresh, &c. Being about to proceed, Mr. Dinsmore observed, that it was necessary for persons passing through the nation, to show their passports. Gen. Jackson replied, 'that Gen. Jackson required no passport to travel through the Indian nation.' Mr. Dinsmore said that he did not know Gen. Jackson from any other man, and that in demanding his passport, he was only doing his duty, in conformity with instructions from the War Department. By this time the general, having sent forward his negroes, had mounted his horse, and laying his hand upon his pistols, significantly replied, 'These are General Jackson's passports!!!' I have often thought of this anecdote of Mr. Dinsmore's whenever the Constitution, laws, or the orders of government, have thwarted the arbitrary will of this man. Shall weapons of war be his passport to our suffrage, and to the Chair of State?

After the news broke, and it was reported that Dismoor had not been present at the agency at the time in question, Dismoor himself then wrote the newspaper on July 14, 1828, with his insight on the incident:

With respect to the anecdote related by Mr. M'Ilhenny, so far as I was reported to have had an interview with General Jackson, it is not accurate. I never saw Gen. Jackson in the Choctaw nation but once, about the 29 or 30th of March, 1813, when he had a number of his officers supped with me at the agency house. With the exception above, I believe the statement of Major M'Ilhenny substantially correct. I had left a young man in charge of the agency house, and directed him, though not employed in the public service, to receive passports from travellers, and to record them in a book kept for that purpose. He reported an interview between Gen. Jackson and himself, corresponding in the features to that contained in Major M'llhenny's publication, with a change of name only. I undoubtedly repeated the report of the young man, and very probably in the presence of Major M. which may readily account for the mistake. Had the interview taken place between the General and myself, I am under the impression that the result would have been different.

== Later life and death ==
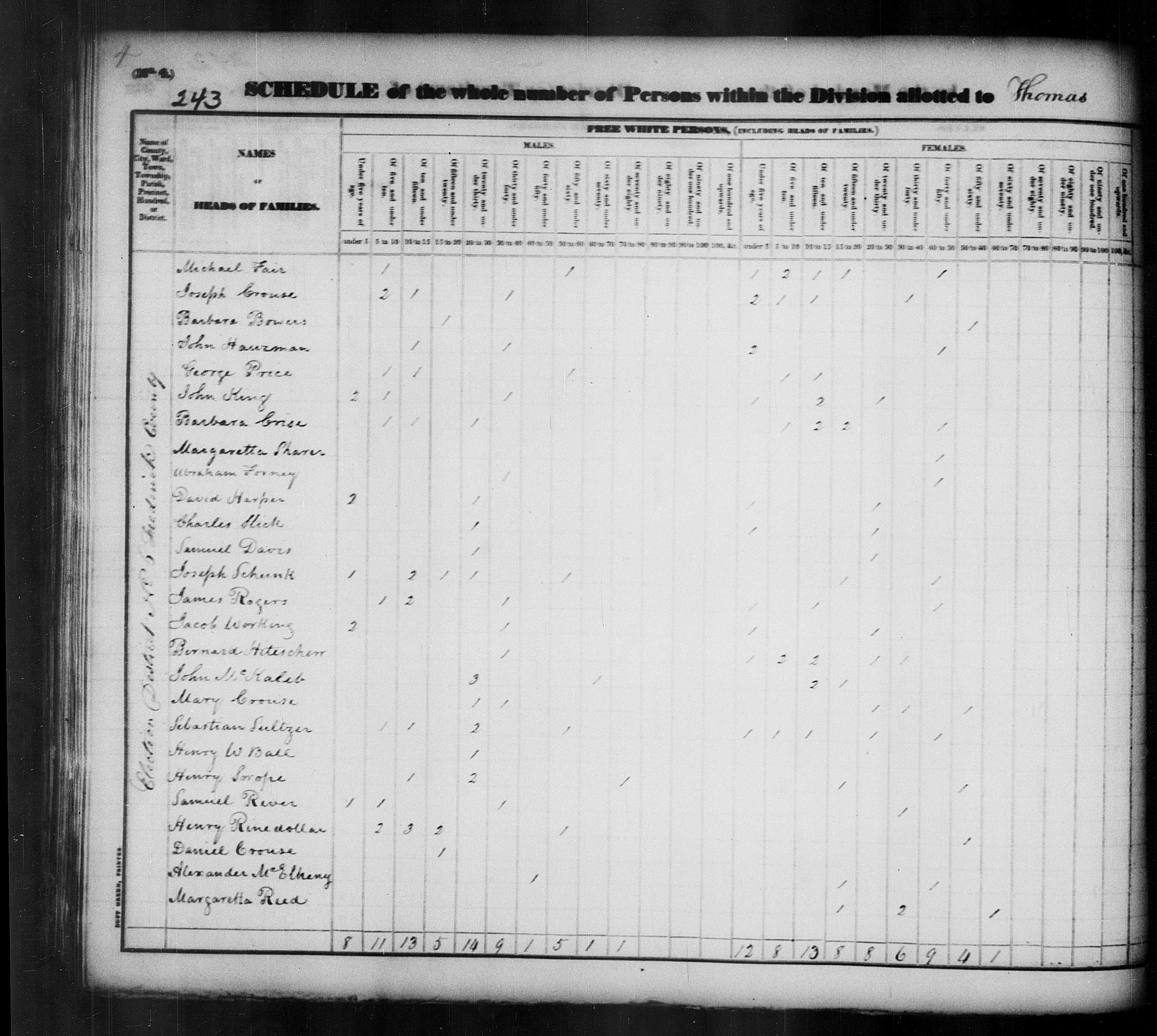
Partial entry for Alexander McElheny, 1830 U.S. census, Frederick County, Maryland

McIlhenny apparently kept journals, with his diaries from 1810, 1817, and 1830 surviving into the 20th century. As of 1914, the 1810 and 1817 journals were "owned by Mrs. Rodkey" and the 1830 journal was "owned by Dr. J. J. Weaver." McIlhenny wrote in his journals about elections, sermons, trading books with neighbors, visiting with kin, establishing fruit trees, butchering animals, making candles, snowstorms, floods, and the arrival of their babies. He may have earned some side income as a cooper. The McIlhennys seem to have owned a 283-acre farm with a peach orchard and log house on Meadow Branch creek, but they lived in rented or borrowed brick houses in Uniontown "where Alexander McIlhenny pursued a legal and political career."

Another topic covered in the 1830 diary is the work of their slave Harry, who was between 36 and 55 years old, and who may have been a bequest to Elizabeth Reid McIlhenny from her great-uncle Upton Scott. Harry's most common task assignments were cutting firewood (many diary entries include the statement "Harry in the woods"), and grinding corn for meal. One entry says that "Harry made a new mould," but not to what purpose, and another reads, "Harry took up the last of our apples. More specks than sound." The entry of February 7, 1830 records "snow began to fall" and "Harry went to see his wife," suggesting that McIlhenny personally acknowledged slave marriages. The McIlhennys may have also occasionally employed a free woman of color named Ann Hays for household help. Harry was apparently hired out to someone called Koontz on occasion.

In 1830 he wrote at least one item, "All a Blank," for a newspaper called The Patriot. McIlhenny's literacy was valuable to his community; in one case he recorded in his diary, "I wrote 10 advertisements for Mr. Jacob Appler, he pd. Me 50 cts voluntarily." In another case, "I wrote a deed of manumission John Smith to Aaron Linconstant – after 8 years." In 1830, while visiting Baltimore, "I was summoned by the marshal and seized [served?] about 3 weeks on the U.S. Circuit Court. Tried John Gooding for Slaving, and Capt. J. D. Quincy and Lieut. A. Ramsey for Piracy and these two and several others for misdemeanors in fitting out vessels to cruise as privateers."

According to a death announcement published in a Gettysburg newspaper in Adams County, Pennsylvania of Gettysburg, McIlhenny died in Maryland on January 25, 1835, at age 56. The cause of death was "an affliction of the liver." He and his wife are buried at Runnymeade Cemetery, also known as Nusbaums' Cemetery, a family graveyard on an old farm that was granted and recorded during the colonial period as Runnymeade. The cemetery is near Tyrone, a rural village located about halfway between Taneytown and Westminster in present-day Carroll County.

== See also ==
- George Kephart – American slave trader (1811–1888), McIlhenny was acquainted with his siblings Peter and Sarah Kephart
- United States v. Gooding (1827)
