= Francis Brown Sappington =

American politician and physician

Member of the Maryland House of Delegates from the Frederick County district
- In office 1808–1809 Serving with George Baer Jr., John Thomas, John H. Thomas
- Preceded by: Benjamin Biggs, Thomas Hawkins, Henry Kuhn, David Shriver Jr.
- Succeeded by: George Baer Jr., John Schley, John Thomas, John H. Thomas
- In office 1799–1800 Serving with David Shriver, John Thomas, Henry Ridgely Warfield
- Preceded by: Upton Bruce, John Gwinn, John Thomas, Henry Ridgely Warfield
- Succeeded by: Thomas Hawkins, Henry Kemp, Roger Nelson, David Shriver
- In office 1792–1793 Serving with William Beatty, Joshua Dorsey, Roger Nelson
- Preceded by: William Beatty, George Burkhart, John Ross Key, Patrick Sim Smith
- Succeeded by: Mountjoy Bayly, William Beatty, Benedict Jamison, Roger Nelson

Personal details
- Born: near Ellicott City, Maryland, U.S.
- Died: c. 1839 Libertytown, Maryland, U.S.
- Party: Federalist
- Spouse: Ann Ridgely
- Children: 7, including Thomas
- Relatives: James McSherry Jr. (grandson); James McSherry (great-grandson); Richard F. Sappington (great-grandson)
- Education: College of Philadelphia (BA)
- Occupation: Politician; physician

Francis Brown Sappington (died c. 1839) was an American politician and physician from Maryland. He served as a member of the Maryland House of Delegates, representing Frederick County.

== Early life ==
Francis Brown Sappington was born near Ellicott City, Maryland, to Frances (née Brown) and Thomas Sappington. He graduated from the College of Philadelphia with a Bachelor of Arts in 1775. Members of the Second Continental Congress, including George Washington attended his commencement. At the commencement, Sappington spoke on the topic of "The Education of Young Ladies".

== Career ==
Sappington worked as a physician in Libertytown. He was considered one of the founders of the Medical and Chirurgical Faculty of the State of Maryland and an incorporator of the University of Maryland. He was associated with John P. Thompson in the founding of the Frederick Town Herald.

Sappington was a Federalist. He served as a member of the Maryland House of Delegates, representing Frederick County from 1792 to 1793, 1799 to 1800 and 1808 to 1809.

== Personal life ==
Sappington married a cousin of his brother Thomas Jr.'s wife. He married Ann Ridgely, daughter of Greenberry Ridgely and descendant of Cardinal Richelieu. They lived in Libertytown. He had seven children, including Thomas, Francis B., Matilda or Martha, Harriet, Annie, Lydia and Nancy. His daughter Nancy married a McSherry, the father of James McSherry Jr. and grandfather of James McSherry. His son Thomas was a state delegate and served in the War of 1812. His great-grandson Richard F. Sappington was a state delegate.

Sappington died in Libertytown around 1839.

== Legacy ==
His Windsor armchair is displayed in the Etchison Room of the Historical Society in Frederick. The University of Pennsylvania preserves Sappington's knee breeches worn under his graduation gown during his College of Philadelphia commencement.
