= National Republican Party =

American political party

- Other name: Adams–Clay Republicans; Adams's Men; Anti-Jacksonians
- Leader: John Quincy Adams; Henry Clay
- Founded: 1824; 202 years ago
- Dissolved: 1834; 192 years ago
- Split from: Democratic-Republican Party
- Preceded by: Democratic-Republican Party; Federalist Party
- Merged into: Whig Party
- Ideology: American School; Anti-Jacksonianism; Traditionalist conservatism; Economic nationalism; Classical liberalism Conservative liberalism Liberal nationalism Conservatism Liberalism
- National affiliation: Democratic-Republican Party (1824)

The National Republican Party, also known as the Anti-Jacksonian Party or simply Republicans, was a political party in the United States which evolved from a faction of the Democratic-Republican Party that supported John Quincy Adams in the 1824 presidential election.

Known initially as Adams–Clay Republicans in the wake of the 1824 campaign, Adams's political allies in Congress and at the state-level were referred to as "Adams's Men" during his presidency (1825–1829). When Andrew Jackson became president, following his victory over Adams in the 1828 election, this group became the opposition, and organized themselves as "Anti-Jackson". The use of the term "National Republican" dates from 1830.

Henry Clay was the party's nominee in the 1832 election, but was defeated by Jackson. The party supported Clay's American System of nationally financed internal improvements and a protective tariff. After the 1832 election, opponents of Jackson, including the National Republicans, Anti-Masons and others, coalesced into the Whig Party.

== History ==
Before the election of John Quincy Adams to the presidency in 1825, the Democratic-Republican Party, which had been the only national American political party for over a decade, began to fracture, losing its infrastructure and identity. Its caucuses no longer met to select candidates because now they had separate interests. After the 1824 election, factions developed in support of Adams and in support of Andrew Jackson. Adams politicians, including most ex-Federalists (such as Daniel Webster and Adams himself), would gradually become members of the National Republican Party; and those politicians that supported Jackson would later help form the modern Democratic Party.

After Adams's defeat in the 1828 election, his supporters regrouped around Henry Clay. Now the "anti-Jackson" opposition, they soon organized as the National Republican Party. Led by Clay, the new party maintained its historic nationalistic outlook and desired to use national resources to build a strong economy. Its platform was Clay's American System of nationally financed internal improvements and a protective tariff, which would promote faster economic development. More important, by binding together the diverse interests of the different regions, the party intended to promote national unity and harmony.

Historians refer to the National Republican Party, but the term Anti-Jackson was frequently used at the time. For instance in 1830, Alexander McIlhenny recorded in his diary, "May 29th: I attended the Anti Jackson meeting at Sultzers in Taney Town. Addressed a few words to the meeting."

The National Republicans saw the Union as a corporate, organic whole. Hence, the rank and file idealized Clay for his comprehensive perspective on the national interest. Conversely, they disdained those they identified as "party" politicians for pandering to local interests at the expense of the national interest. The party met in national convention in late 1831 and nominated Clay for the presidency and John Sergeant for the vice presidency.

=== Formation of the Whig Party ===
The Whig Party emerged in 1833–1834 after Clay's defeat as a coalition of National Republicans, along with Anti-Masons, disaffected Jacksonians and people whose last political activity had been with the Federalists a decade before. In the short term, the Whig Party formed with the help of other smaller parties in a coalition against President Jackson and his reforms.

== National Republican presidents ==
John Quincy Adams was the only president to come from the National Republican Party.

#	Name (lifespan)	Portrait	State	Presidency start date	Presidency end date	Time in office
6	John Quincy Adams (1767–1848)		Massachusetts	March 4, 1825	March 4, 1829	4 years, 0 days

== Electoral history ==
=== Presidential tickets ===
Election	Ticket		Popular vote	Electoral vote	
Election	Presidential nominee	Running mate	Percentage	Electoral votes	Ranking
1828	John Quincy Adams	Richard Rush	44.0	83 / 261	2
1832	Henry Clay	John Sergeant	37.4	49 / 286	2

=== Congressional representation ===
Congress	Years	Senate					House of Representatives					President
Congress	Years	Total	Pro-Jackson	Pro-Adams	Others	Vacancies	Total	Pro-Jackson	Pro-Adams	Others	Vacancies	President
19th	1825–1827	48	26	22	—	—	213	104	109	—	—	John Quincy Adams
20th	1827–1829	48	27	21	—	—	213	113	100	—	—	John Quincy Adams
Congress	Years	Total	Pro-Jackson	Anti-Jackson	Others	Vacancies	Total	Pro-Jackson	Anti-Jackson	Others	Vacancies	President
21st	1829–1831	48	25	23	—	—	213	136	72	5	—	Andrew Jackson
22nd	1831–1833	48	24	22	2	—	213	126	66	21	—	Andrew Jackson
23rd	1833–1835	48	20	26	2	—	240	143	63	34	—	Andrew Jackson
24th	1835–1837	52	26	24	2	—	242	143	75	24	—	Andrew Jackson

== See also ==
- Era of Good Feelings
- Second Party System
