= Fort Dearborn (disambiguation) =

Fort Dearborn is a historic United States fort in what is now Chicago, Illinois.

Fort Dearborn may also refer to:

- Fort Dearborn (Mississippi)
- Fort Dearborn (New Hampshire)

== See also ==
- Battle of Fort Dearborn, a battle fought at the Illinois fort between the United States and Potawatomi during the War of 1812.
