= James McSherry Jr. =

American lawyer and writer (1819–1869)

- Born: July 29, 1819; Libertytown, Maryland, U.S.
- Died: July 13, 1869 (aged 49); Frederick, Maryland, U.S.
- Education: Mount St. Mary's College
- Occupations: Lawyer; writer
- Spouse: Eliza Spurrier (m. 1841)
- Children: 5, including James
- Father: James McSherry
- Relatives: William McSherry (brother); Francis Brown Sappington (grandfather)

James McSherry Jr. (July 29, 1819 – July 13, 1869) was an American lawyer and writer.

== Early life ==
James McSherry Jr. was born on July 29, 1819, in Libertytown, Maryland, to Ann Ridgely (née Sappington) and James McSherry. His brother was William McSherry. His grandfather was Francis Brown Sappington. He graduated from Mount St. Mary's College, in Emmitsburg, Maryland, in 1838, where he studied law. He read law in Frederick and was admitted to the bar in 1840.

== Career ==
McSherry began practicing law in Gettysburg, Pennsylvania, with Thaddeus Stevens. He returned to Frederick in 1841. He continued to practice law in Frederick, until his death.

McSherry is best known for his "History of Maryland" (Baltimore, 1849). He was a frequent contributor to the "United States Catholic Magazine", and also wrote "Pere Jean, or the Jesuit Missionary" (1849). He also contributed to Baltimore's Metropolitan Magazine. He published "Willitoff, or the Days of James the First: a Tale" (1851), republished in German (Frankfort, 1858).

== Family ==
McSherry married Eliza Spurrier on September 30, 1841. They had five children, James, William S., Edward C., Alice and Gertrude. His son James was chief judge of the Court of Appeals of Maryland.

McSherry died on July 13, 1869, at his home on East Second Street in Frederick.
