= Uniontown, Maryland =

Unincorporated community in Maryland, U.S.

Coordinates: 39°35′36″N 77°06′58″W

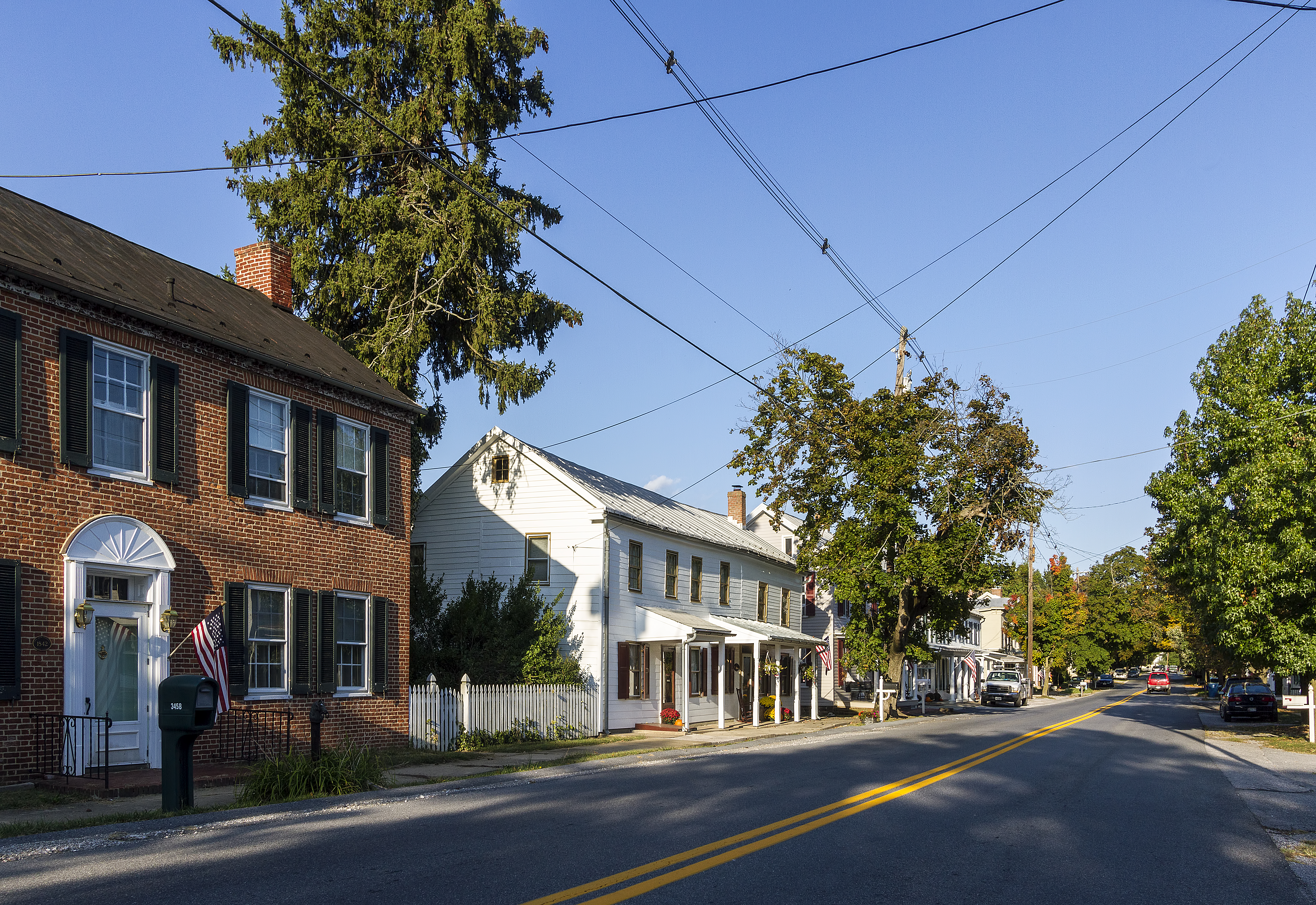
Uniontown Historic District in Uniontown

Uniontown is an unincorporated community in Carroll County, Maryland, United States. The community is home to the Uniontown Historic District, added to the National Register of Historic Places in 1986.

The band Half Japanese began here.
