= Thomas Sappington =

American politician (c.1789–1857)

Member of the Maryland Senate from the Western Shore district
- In office 1831–1836

Member of the Maryland House of Delegates from the Frederick County district
- In office 1825–1827 Serving with Samuel Barrnes, John C. Cockey, William P. Farquhar, Alexander McIlhenny
- Preceded by: Samuel Barnes, Joseph M. Cromwell, William P. Farquhar, Henry Kemp
- Succeeded by: Nicholas Holtz, David Kemp, Isaac Shriver, Francis Thomas

Personal details
- Born: c. 1789 Libertytown, Maryland, U.S.
- Died: July 18, 1857 Frederick, Maryland, U.S.
- Party: Whig; Democratic; Know Nothing
- Spouse(s): Sarah Coale; Louisa C. Klein
- Children: 16, including Greenberry
- Parent: Francis Brown Sappington (father)
- Relatives: Richard F. Sappington (grandson)
- Occupation: Politician; newspaper editor; farmer

Thomas Sappington (c. 1789 – July 18, 1857) was an American politician. He served as a member of the Maryland House of Delegates and Maryland Senate.

== Early life ==
Sappington was born c. 1789 in Libertytown, Maryland, to Ann (née Ridgely or Richelieu) and Francis Brown Sappington. His father was a physician in Libertytown and served as a state delegate. His mother was a relative of Cardinal Richelieu. He was educated in schools in Frederick County.

== Career ==
As a young man, Sappington traveled with Mr. Beard to Kentucky to visit his uncle, John Sappington. He settled in Beardstown. While in Kentucky, he served in a cavalry regiment in the War of 1812. He served under William Henry Harrison and fought at the Battle of Tippecanoe. After the war, he ran a store in Libertytown with his brother Francis B. for a short time. He also worked as a farmer.

Sappington was first a Whig and later became a Democrat. He served as a member of the Maryland House of Delegates, representing Frederick County from 1825 to 1827. He served as a member of the Maryland Senate, representing the Western Shore from 1831 to 1836. He was president and president pro tempore of the senate in 1834. He chaired the 1833 reform convention in Baltimore.

Sappington was appointed as register of wills by Governor Thomas Pratt in 1844 or 1845. He served in that role until 1851. He then was editor of the Frederick Herald for three years. At the time of his death, he was affiliated with the Know Nothing.

== Personal life ==
Sappington married Sarah Coale, daughter of Richard Cole and sister of James M. Coale. They had nine sons and two daughters, including James, John, Thomas, Henry, Greenberry R., Sidney, Augustus, William Coale, Francis B., Caroline (or Catherine) and Sarah "Sally" R. He later married Louisa (née Louise) C. Klein, daughter of Charles S. Klein. They had five sons, Richelieu, Richard D., Wentworth, Francis Brown and George. His son Greenberry served in the Maryland senate. His grandson, Richard F. Sappington, was a state delegate.

Sappington died on July 18, 1857, in Frederick.
