= Seth Shepard =

American judge

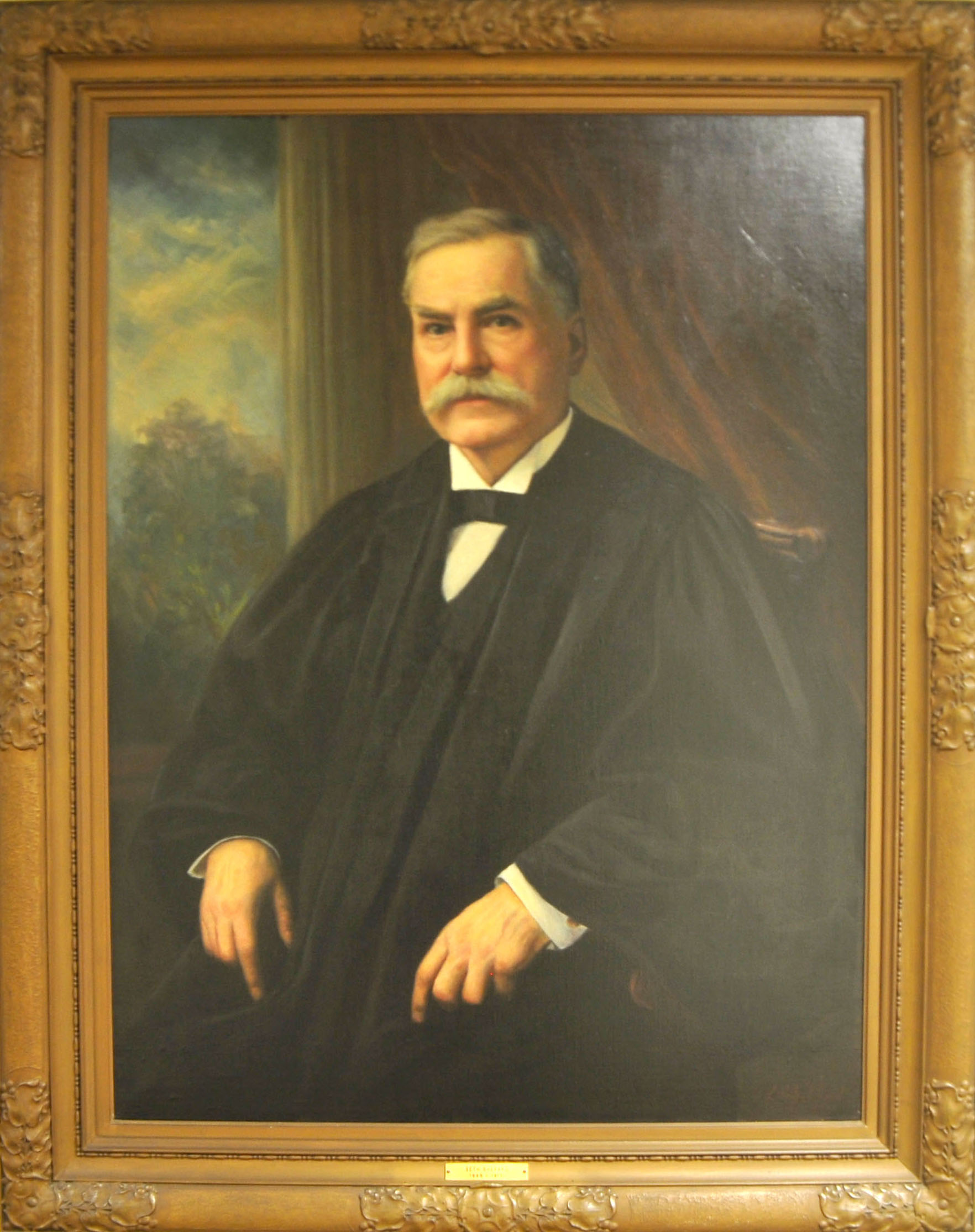

Chief Justice of the Court of Appeals of the District of Columbia
- In office January 5, 1905 – September 30, 1917
- Appointed by: Theodore Roosevelt
- Preceded by: Richard H. Alvey
- Succeeded by: Constantine Joseph Smyth

Associate Justice of the Court of Appeals of the District of Columbia
- In office April 15, 1893 – January 19, 1905
- Appointed by: Grover Cleveland
- Preceded by: Seat established 27 Stat. 434
- Succeeded by: Charles Holland Duell

Personal details
- Born: Seth Shepard; April 23, 1847 Brenham, Texas, U S.
- Died: December 3, 1917 (aged 70) Washington, D.C., U.S.
- Education: Washington and Lee University; School of Law (LLB)

Seth Shepard (April 23, 1847 – December 3, 1917) was an Associate Justice and Chief Justice of the Court of Appeals of the District of Columbia.

== Education and career ==
Born in Brenham, Texas, Shepard was a private in the Confederate States Army from 1864 to 1865. He received a Bachelor of Laws from Washington College (now Washington and Lee University School of Law) in 1868 and entered private practice in Brenham. He was a member of the Texas Senate from 1874 to 1875, thereafter returning to private practice in Galveston, Texas until 1886, and then in Dallas, Texas from 1886 to 1893.

== Federal judicial service ==
Shepard was nominated by President Grover Cleveland on April 14, 1893, to the Court of Appeals of the District of Columbia (now the United States Court of Appeals for the District of Columbia Circuit), to a new Associate Justice seat authorized by 27 Stat. 434. He was confirmed by the United States Senate on April 15, 1893, and received his commission the same day. His service terminated on January 19, 1905, due to his elevation to be Chief Justice of the same court.

Shepard was nominated by President Theodore Roosevelt on December 16, 1904, to the Chief Justice seat on the Court of Appeals for the District of Columbia (now the United States Court of Appeals for the District of Columbia Circuit) vacated by Chief Justice Richard H. Alvey. He was confirmed by the Senate on January 5, 1905, and received his commission the same day. His service terminated on September 30, 1917, due to his retirement.

=== Other service ===
Concurrent with his federal judicial service, Shepard was a lecturer in law at Georgetown University from 1895 to 1910.

== Death ==
Shepard died on December 3, 1917, aged 70, in Washington, D.C.

== Sources ==
- \

Legal offices
Preceded by Seat established by 27 Stat. 434	Associate Justice of the Court of Appeals of the District of Columbia; 1893–1905	Succeeded by Charles Holland Duell
Preceded by Richard H. Alvey	Chief Justice of the Court of Appeals of the District of Columbia; 1905–1917	Succeeded by Constantine Joseph Smyth
