= Abraham Jones House =

Historic house in Maryland

- U.S. National Register of Historic Places
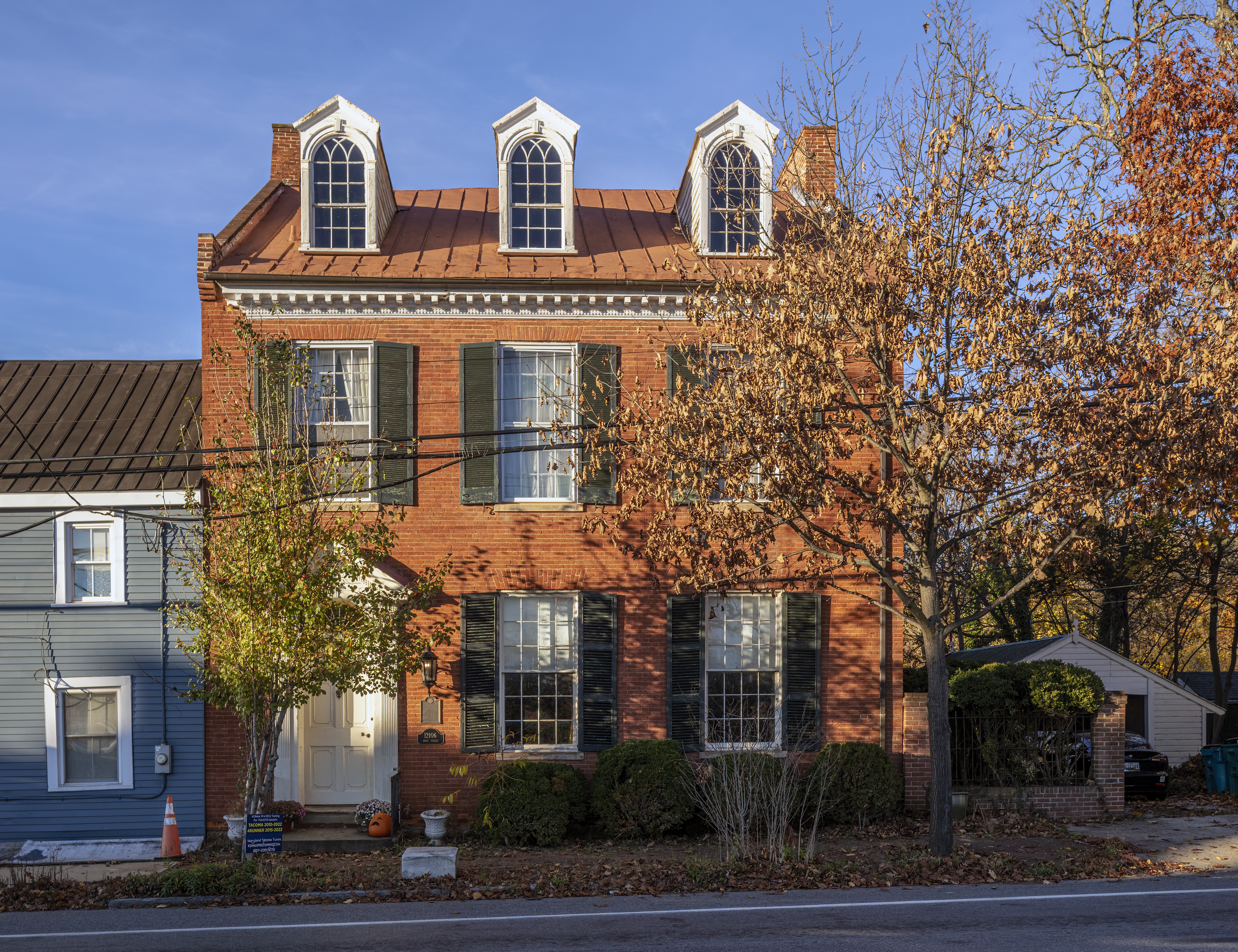
- Abraham Jones House in 2022

- Location within Maryland Location within the United States
- Location: 12106 Main Street (MD 26), Libertytown, Maryland
- Coordinates: 39°29′7″N 77°14′24″W
- Area: less than one acre
- Architectural style: Federal
- NRHP reference No.: 73000917
- Added to NRHP: July 24, 1973

The Abraham Jones House is a historic home located at Libertytown, Frederick County, Maryland, United States. It is a 2 1/2-story, Flemish bond brick house attached to a later frame structure. Roof features include low "parapets" formed by the extension of the gable walls and at each end of the roof ridge are single flush gable chimneys. The main entrance door is an example of Federal period craftsmanship and design. It is one of the finest Federal houses in Maryland.

The Abraham Jones House was listed on the National Register of Historic Places in 1973.

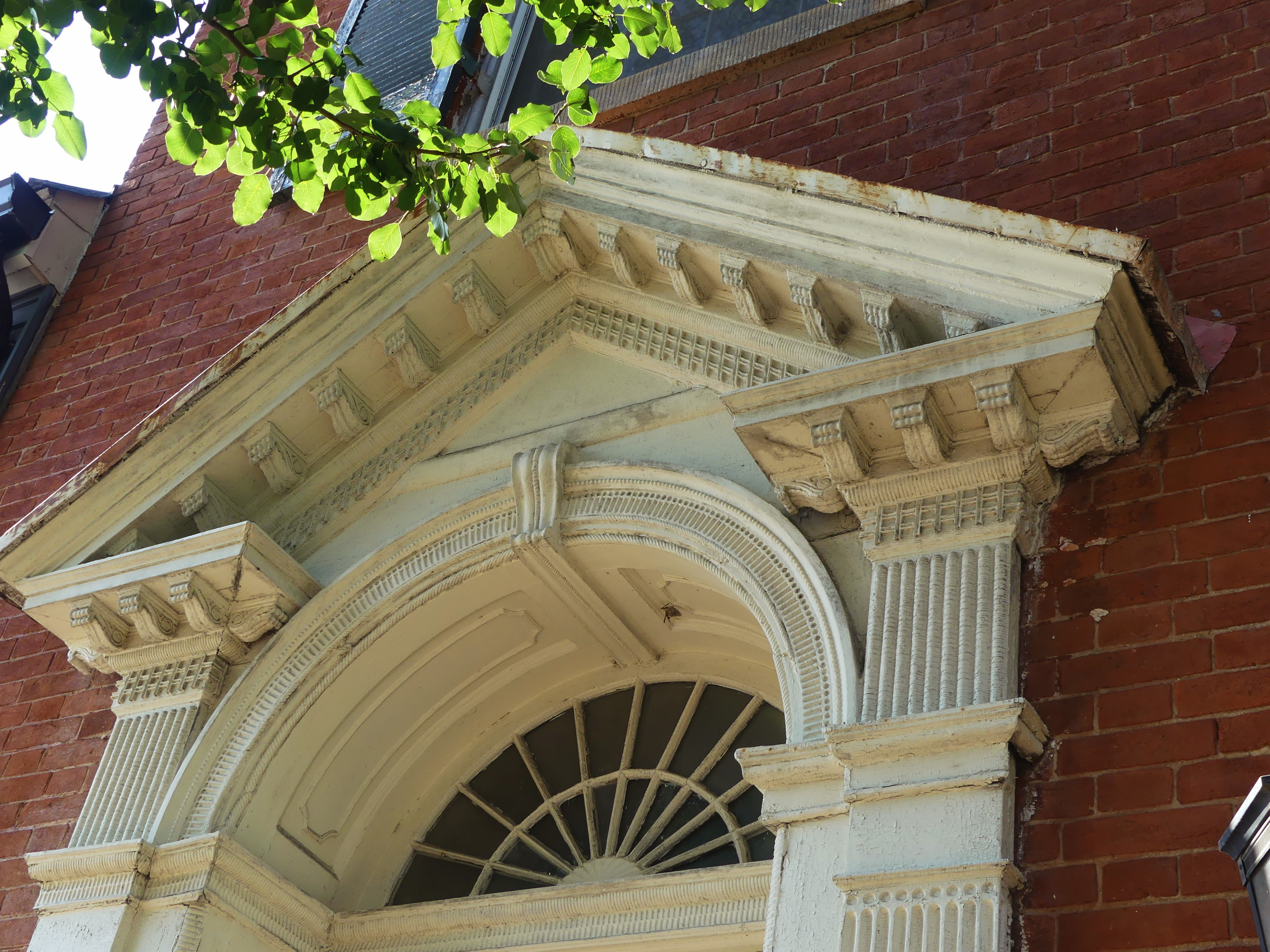
Architectural Detail of the Abraham Jones House Portico in August 2025

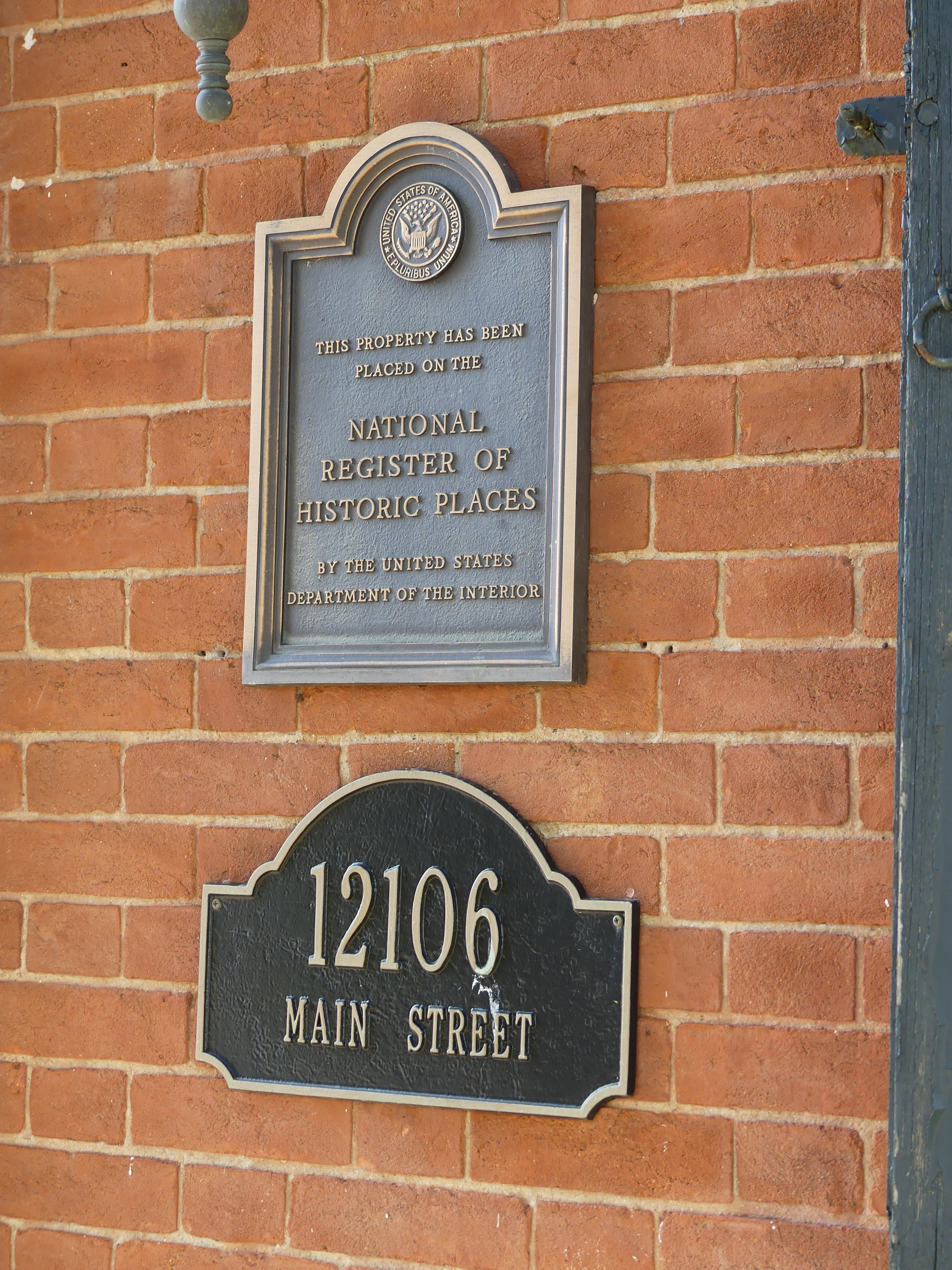
National Register of Historic Places and Address Plaques for Abraham Jones House
