= Charles Holland Duell =

American judge

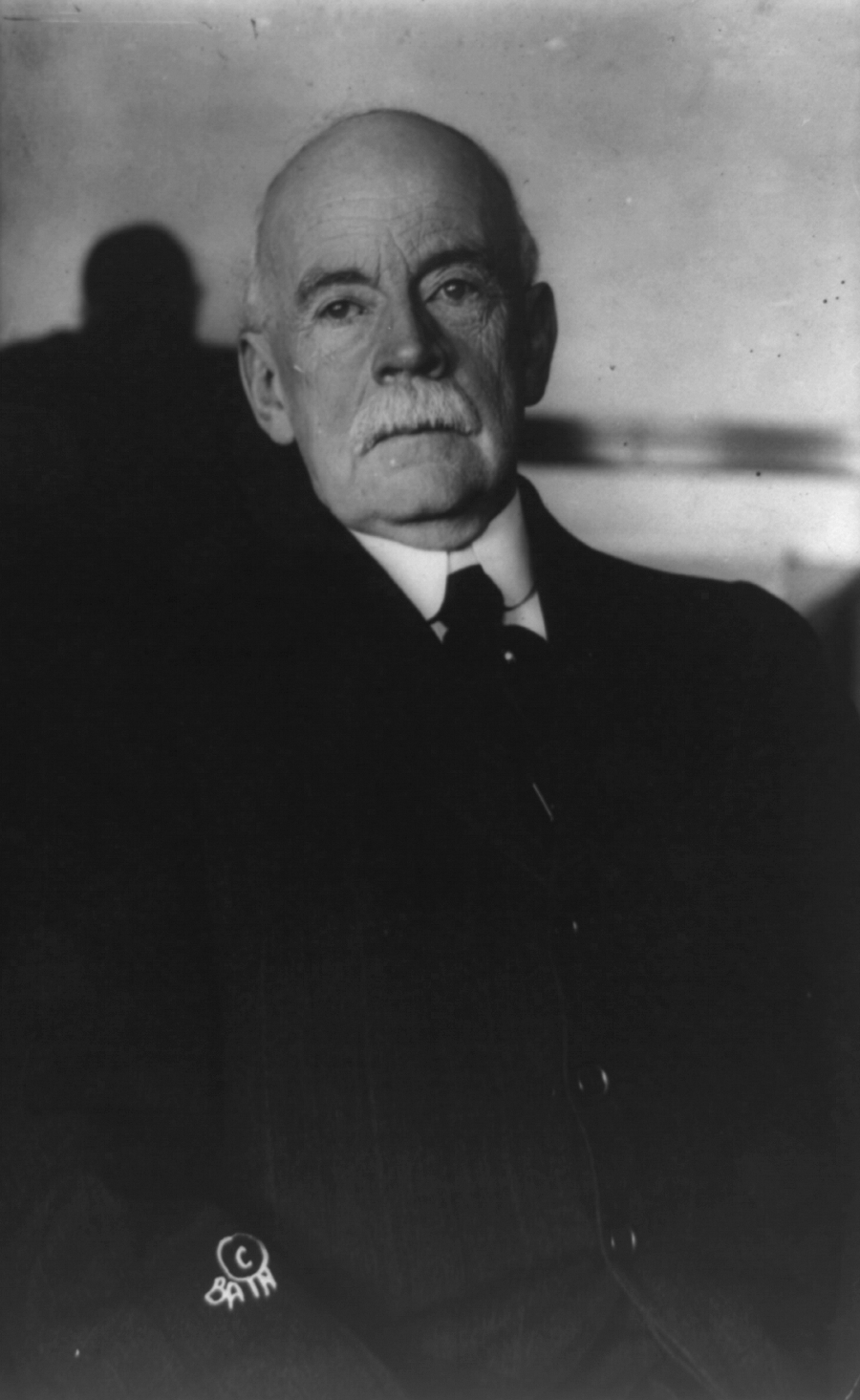

Associate Justice of the Court of Appeals of the District of Columbia
- In office January 5, 1905 – August 31, 1906
- Appointed by: Theodore Roosevelt
- Preceded by: Seth Shepard
- Succeeded by: Charles Henry Robb

Commissioner of the United States Patent Office
- In office 1898–1901
- Appointed by: William McKinley
- Preceded by: Benjamin Butterworth
- Succeeded by: Frederick Innes Allen

Member of the New York State Assembly from the 13th district
- In office April 2, 1878 – December 31, 1878
- Preceded by: John Clark
- Succeeded by: Robert H. Strahan
- In office January 1, 1880 – December 31, 1880
- Preceded by: Robert H. Strahan
- Succeeded by: Arthur D. Williams

Personal details
- Born: Charles Holland Duell; April 13, 1850 Cortland, New York, U.S.
- Died: January 29, 1920 (aged 69) Yonkers, New York, U.S.
- Children: Holland S. Duell
- Parent: R. Holland Duell (father)
- Education: Hamilton College

Charles Holland Duell (April 13, 1850 – January 29, 1920) was the Commissioner of the United States Patent Office from 1898 to 1901, and was later an associate judge of the Court of Appeals of the District of Columbia.

== Early life and career ==
Born on April 13, 1850, in Cortland, New York, Duell received an Artium Baccalaureus degree in 1871 from Hamilton College and graduated from Hamilton College Law School in 1872. He worked in private practice in New York City from 1873 to 1880. He served as a member of the New York State Assembly in 1878 and 1880. He returned to private practice in Syracuse, New York, from 1880 to 1898. In 1898, he was appointed the United States Commissioner of Patents of the United States Patent Office, leading what is now known as the United States Patent and Trademark Office, a position he held until 1901. He resumed private practice in New York City from 1901 to 1904. He was a presidential elector in 1908.

== Federal judicial service ==
Duell was nominated by President Theodore Roosevelt on December 16, 1904, to an Associate Justice seat on the Court of Appeals of the District of Columbia (now the United States Court of Appeals for the District of Columbia Circuit) vacated by Associate Justice Seth Shepard. He was confirmed by the United States Senate on January 5, 1905, and received his commission the same day. His service terminated on August 31, 1906, due to his resignation.

== Later career and death ==
Following his resignation from the federal bench, Duell resumed private practice in New York City from 1906 to 1913, and in 1915. He died on January 29, 1920, in Yonkers, New York.

== Personal ==
Duell was the son of Congressman R. Holland Duell (1824–1891) and Mary L. (Cuyler) Duell (1822–1884). He married Harriet M. Sackett (born 1854), and they had several children, among them State Senator Holland S. Duell (1881–1942).

== "Everything that can be invented has been invented" ==
Duell is widely known for the statement he purportedly made during his time as United States Commissioner of Patents: "Everything that can be invented has been invented." However, this has been debunked as apocryphal by librarian Samuel Sass who traced the quote back to a 1981 book titled "The Book of Facts and Fallacies" by Chris Morgan and David Langford. Duell said in 1902:

In my opinion, all previous advances in the various lines of invention will appear totally insignificant when compared with those which the present century will witness. I almost wish that I might live my life over again to see the wonders which are at the threshold.

Dennis Crouch saw a correlation between the expression and a joke from an 1899 edition of Punch magazine.

In that edition, the comedy magazine offered a look at the "coming century." In colloquy, a genius asked, "Isn't there a clerk who can examine patents?" A boy replied, "Quite unnecessary, Sir. Everything that can be invented has been invented."

Another possible origin of this famous statement may be found in a report to Congress in 1843 by an earlier Patent Office Commissioner, Henry Ellsworth. In it, Ellsworth states, "The advancement of the arts, from year to year, taxes our credulity and seems to presage the arrival of that period when human improvement must end." This quote was apparently then mispresented and attributed to Duell, who held the same office in 1899.

New York State Assembly
Preceded by John Clark	New York State Assembly; New York County, 13th District; 1878	Succeeded by Robert H. Strahan
Preceded by Robert H. Strahan	New York State Assembly; New York County, 13th District; 1880	Succeeded by Arthur D. Williams
Legal offices
Preceded by Benjamin Butterworth	United States Commissioner of Patents; 1898–1901	Succeeded by Frederick Innes Allen
Preceded by Seth Shepard	Associate Justice of the Court of Appeals of the District of Columbia; 1905–1906	Succeeded by Charles Henry Robb

== Sources ==
- Sackett family
