= Richard F. Sappington =

American politician (1861–1930)

Member of the Maryland House of Delegates from the Frederick County district
- In office 1892–1894 Serving with James S. Biggs, Joseph W. Gaver, Manasses J. Grove, James Roger McSherry
- Preceded by: Ephraim L. Boblitz, John W. Kauffman, William P. Morsell, Frank C. Norwood, F. Granville Thomas
- Succeeded by: Andrew A. Annan, George W. Crum Jr., James P. Perry, John R. Rouzer, Melvin P. Wood

Personal details
- Born: Richard Frank Sappington; January 5, 1861 Libertytown, Maryland, U.S.
- Died: April 6, 1930 (aged 69) Libertytown, Maryland, U.S.
- Party: Democratic
- Spouse: Rose Callahan (m. 1884)
- Relations: Thomas Sappington (grandfather); Francis Brown Sappington (great-grandfather)
- Occupation: Politician

Richard Frank Sappington (also Richard Francis Sappington; January 5, 1861 – April 6, 1930) was an American politician. A Democrat, he was a member of the Maryland House of Delegates from 1892 to 1894.

== Biography ==
Sappington was born on January 5, 1861, in Libertytown, Maryland, one of six children born to physician Sidney A. Sappington and Margaret E. (née Wagener) Sappington. His grandfather was Maryland state senator Thomas Sappington and his great-grandfather was Francis Brown Sappington.

Educated at private schools, Sappington attended Rock Hill College. He worked as a businessman in Libertytown and was a prominent landowner. From 1884 to 1888, he was a farmer, not living in Libertytown during that time. A Democrat, he represented Frederick County in the Maryland House of Delegates from 1892 to 1894. He was also a member of the Frederick County central committee and board of education, having joined the latter c. 1917.

On April 30, 1884, Sappington married Rose M. Callahan. After retiring, he returned to Libertytown. He was Catholic, as well as a member of the Benevolent and Protective Order of Elks. He died on April 6, 1930, aged 69, in Libertytown. He died from diabetes, having been ill since July 1929. In February 1930, he received a surgery to treat an infected toe shortly before his death. He was buried on April 8.
