= Holland S. Duell =

American politician

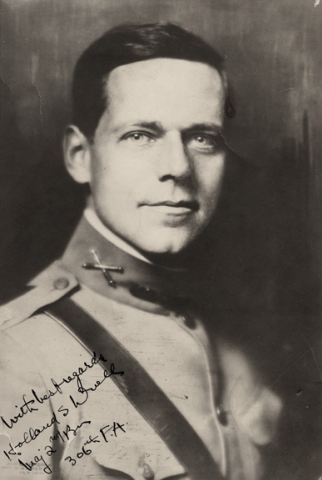
Holland Sackett Duell, 1918

Holland Sackett Duell (January 29, 1881 in Syracuse, New York – November 25, 1942 in Larchmont, New York) was an American lawyer, US Army officer and politician from New York. He was elected Senator from the 26th District, and reached the rank of Lieutenant Colonel.

== Life ==
He was the son of Judge Charles Holland Duell (1850–1920) and Harriet M. (Sackett) Duell. He graduated B.A. from Yale College in 1902, and LL.B. from New York Law School in 1904. He was admitted to the bar, and practiced in New York City, specializing in patent law. On September 29, 1904, he married Mabel Halliwell (born 1882), and they had five children; among them Charles Halliwell Duell (born 1905), one of the founders of the Duell, Sloan and Pearce publishing house.

Duell was a member of the New York State Assembly (Westchester Co., 2nd D.) in 1907 and 1909; and was Chairman of the Committee on Federal Relations in 1909.

In the waning days of World War I, he fought as a major with the 306th Field Artillery, 77th Division, American Expeditionary Forces (July 18, 1918 - November 11, 1918). During that brief period he was awarded both the Distinguished Service Medal and the Distinguished Service Cross for "extraordinary heroism in combat", and further received the Croix de Guerre from the Republic of France. Upon discharge following the end of the war, he received a (retirement) promotion to lieutenant colonel.

He was a member of the New York State Senate (26th D.) in 1921 and 1922, and was Chairman of the Committee on Labor and Industries.

On August 25, 1925, he and his wife Mabel were divorced; and on September 1, 1925, he married Emilie Brown (1884–1965).

He died on November 25, 1942, at his home in Larchmont, New York, after a brief illness; and was buried at the Arlington National Cemetery.

== Sources ==
- COL. DUELL WEDS; REVEALS DIVORCE in NYT on September 2, 1925
- HOLLAND S. DUELL, ATTORNEY, SOLDIER in NYT on November 26, 1942 (subscription required)
- Sackett family
- "Ardenwold", images of his house, and family; his portrait, and obit

New York State Assembly
Preceded by J. Mayhew Wainwright	New York State Assembly; Westchester County, 2nd District; 1907	Succeeded by Marmaduke B. Wright
Preceded by Marmaduke B. Wright	New York State Assembly; Westchester County, 2nd District; 1909	Succeeded by William S. Coffey
New York State Senate
Preceded by Walter W. Law Jr.	New York State Senate; 26th District; 1921–1922	Succeeded by Seabury C. Mastick
