= John Mitchell Robinson =

American judge (1827–1896)

Chief Judge of the Maryland Court of Appeals
- In office 1893–1896
- Preceded by: Richard H. Alvey
- Succeeded by: James McSherry

Personal details
- Born: December 6, 1827 Caroline County, Maryland, U.S.
- Died: January 14, 1896 (aged 68) Annapolis, Maryland, U.S.
- Resting place: Waverly, Queen Anne's County, Maryland, U.S.
- Spouse: Marianna Stoughton Emory
- Children: 6
- Education: Dickinson College

John Mitchell Robinson (December 6, 1827 – January 14, 1896) was an American jurist who served as chief judge of the supreme court of the U.S. state of Maryland, the Court of Appeals.

== Early life ==
John Mitchell Robinson was born on December 6, 1827, in Tuckahoe Neck, Caroline County, Maryland, to Peter Robinson and Sarah Mitchell Robinson. He attended public schools in Denton, Maryland, and graduated from Dickinson College in 1847. He went on to study law under the tutelage of William M. Meredith, Richard B. Carmichael, and Madison Brown, and was admitted to the bar in 1849.

== Career ==
After admission to the bar, Robinson began to practice law in Centreville, Maryland. In 1850, he served as Deputy Attorney General for Queen Anne's and Kent Counties. He also served as State's Attorney for Queen Anne's County from 1851 to 1855, and later as judge of the Queen Anne's and Kent Counties Circuit Court, Third Judicial District, from 1864 to 1867.

In 1867, Robinson was appointed to the newly reconfigured Maryland Court of Appeals as an associate judge. He served in that position until 1884, when he resigned to bid for the Democratic nomination to the United States Senate. In 1893, he returned to the court as Chief Judge, and served in that position until his death.

== Personal life ==
Robinson married Marianna Stoughton Emory, with whom he had five daughters and one son.

Robinson died on January 14, 1896, in Annapolis. He was buried at "Waverly" in Queen Anne's County.

Legal offices
Preceded by Richard H. Alvey	Chief Judge of the Maryland Court of Appeals; 1893–1896	Succeeded by James McSherry
