= William McSherry (Pennsylvania politician) =

American politician

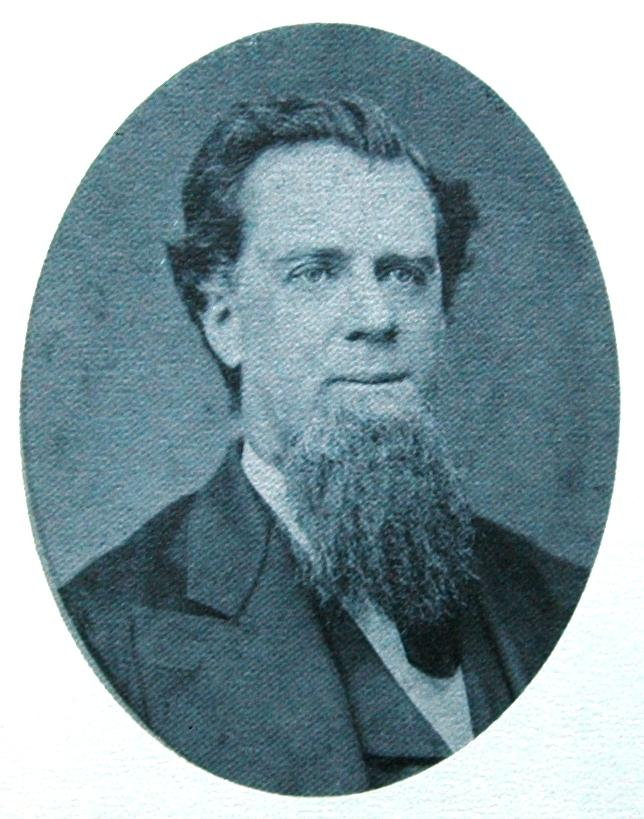
- Senate Portrait

Member of the Pennsylvania Senate from the 20th district
- In office 1872–1874

Member of the Pennsylvania Senate from the 19th district
- In office 1865–1866

Member of the Pennsylvania Senate from the 18th district
- In office 1863–1864
- Preceded by: Alexander McClure
- Succeeded by: George Hough Bucher

Member of the Pennsylvania House of Representatives from Adams County
- In office 1848–1851

Personal details
- Born: April 14, 1821 Littlestown, Pennsylvania
- Died: January 10, 1899 (aged 77) Littlestown, Pennsylvania
- Party: Democrat; Whig
- Spouse(s): Eliza Thompson McSherry (d.1866); Sarah A. Buddy McSherry
- Children: 13
- Education: Mount St. Mary's College
- Occupation: Lawyer

William McSherry (1821-1899) was an American politician who represented Adams County, Pennsylvania in both the Pennsylvania House of Representatives and the Pennsylvania State Senate, initially as a Whig before transitioning to the Democratic party.

== Biography ==
William McSherry was born in Littlestown, Pennsylvania on April 14, 1821, to James McSherry, a state senator, and Ann Ridgely Sappington McSherry. He graduated from the Mount St. Mary's College in 1840 and studied law under James M. Cole, a local Littlestown attorney. McSherry worked concurrently as an attorney and farmer from 1842 to 1873. He was elected as a Whig to the Pennsylvania State House of Representatives in a special election in 1848, serving until 1851. Afterwards he worked as the president of the Littlestown Railroad Company before being elected to a term in the Pennsylvania State Senate serving as a Democrat from 1863 to 1866. Initially, McSherry was elected to the 18th district, however, in his last year he would be redistricted to the Pennsylvania Senate from the 19th district. McSherry did not stand for re-election, however, he would be elected to a second, non-consecutive term, albeit for the 20th district from 1872 to 1874 and did not stand for re-election again. In 1874 he was named the assessor for the 16th Pennsylvania District of the Internal Revenue Service. McSherry also worked as the director of the Gettysburg National Bank, Littlestown Savings Institution, and the Gettysburg and Petersburg Turnpike Company. William McSherry died on January 10, 1899, in Littlestown and was interred in the Saint Aloysius Cemetery in neighboring Germany Township.

== Personal life ==
William McSherry married twice, first to Eliza Thompson McSherry who died in 1866 and a second time to Sarah A. Buddy McSherry. William had thirteen children, Pauline McSherry, Annie McSherry, Cecelia E McSherry, M. Virginia McSherry, James R McSherry, Richard McSherry, William McSherry, Margaret S. McSherry, Mary Catherine McSherry, S. Lilly McSherry, Cyprian W. McSherry, Thomas C. McSherry, and Norbert C. McSherry.
