= James McSherry (Pennsylvania politician) =

American politician (1776–1849)

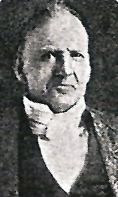

James McSherry (July 29, 1776 – February 3, 1849), was an American politician from Pennsylvania who served as a Federalist member of the U.S. House of Representatives for Pennsylvania's 5th congressional district from 1821 to 1823.

== Early life and education ==
McSherry was born in Littlestown, Pennsylvania, to Irish immigrant Patrick McSherry and was educated at the Lancaster Academy.

== Military service ==
He fought in the War of 1812 in the defense of Baltimore, Maryland.

== Business career ==
He was a founder of the Littlestown Railroad and the Gettysburg National Bank.

== Political career ==
He served in the Pennsylvania House of Representatives (1807–1812). He served as a member of the Pennsylvania State Senate for the 11th district from 1813 to 1817 and was the first Roman Catholic state senator in Pennsylvania. He was a delegate to the Pennsylvania State Constitutional Convention in 1837 and 1838. In 1821, he was elected by the Federalist party to the Seventeenth United States Congress (1821–1823).

Defeated in his re-election bid, he returned to the Pennsylvania State House of Representatives (1824–1830; 1834 and 1835).

== Death and legacy ==
He died on February 3, 1849, and is interred at the Saint Aloysius Cemetery in Littlestown, Pennsylvania.

One of his sons, James McSherry Jr. was a lawyer and writer best known for his "History of Maryland", another, William McSherry was a Pennsylvania State Senator as a Whig and Democrat. His grandson, James McSherry became chief judge of the supreme court U.S. State of Maryland Court of Appeals.

The town of McSherrystown, Pennsylvania, is named in honor of his family.

== Sources ==
- United States Congress. "James McSherry (id: M000602)". Biographical Directory of the United States Congress.
- The Political Graveyard

U.S. House of Representatives
Preceded by Andrew Boden and Thomas Grubb McCullough	Member of the U.S. House of Representatives from Pennsylvania's 5th congressional district 1821–1823 1821–1822 alongside James Duncan; 1822–1823 alongside John Findlay	Succeeded by Philip Swenk Markley
