= Richard H. Alvey =

American judge (1826–1906)

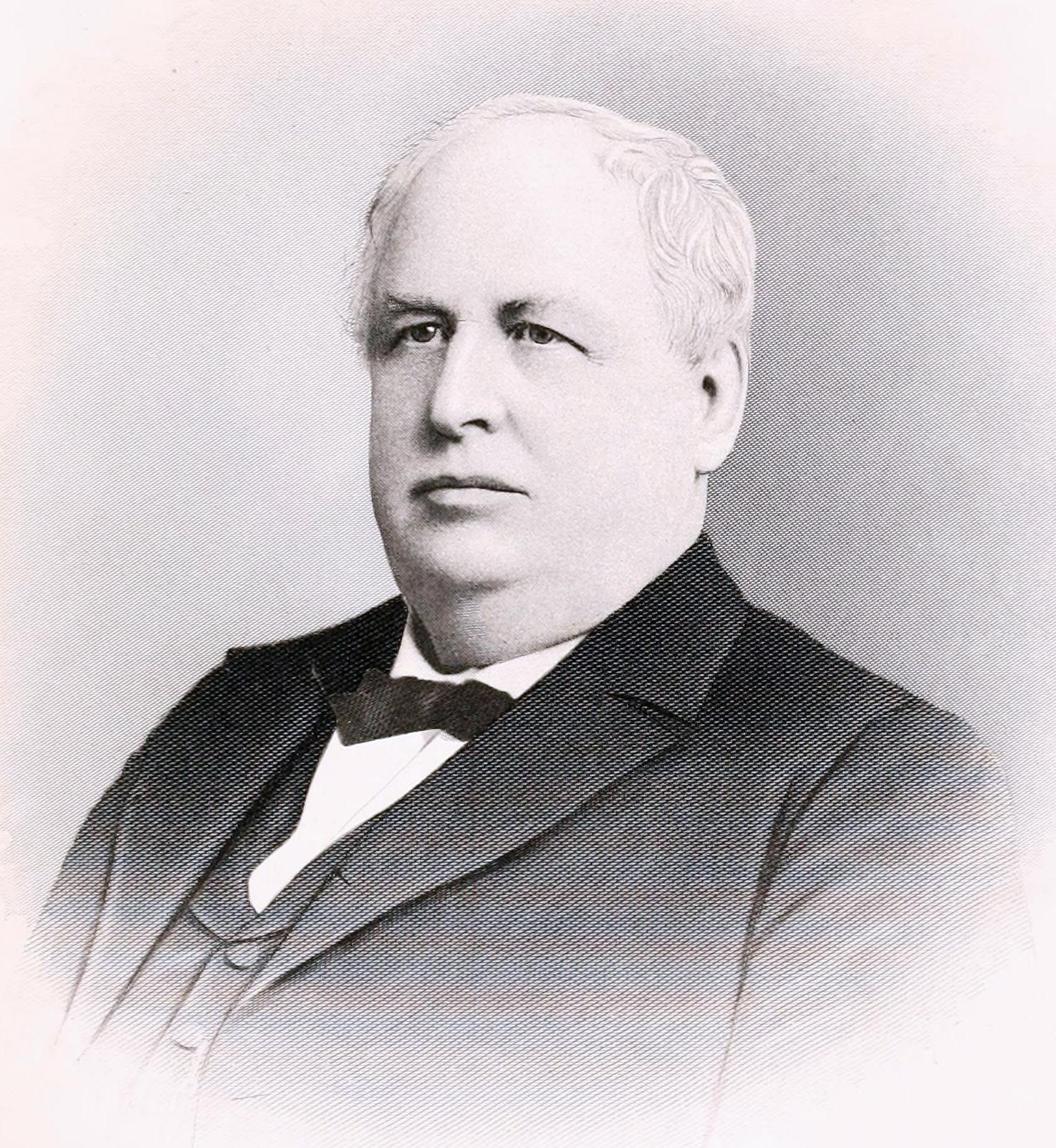

Chief Justice of the Court of Appeals of the District of Columbia
- In office April 15, 1893 – January 1, 1905
- Appointed by: Grover Cleveland
- Preceded by: Seat established by 27 Stat. 434
- Succeeded by: Seth Shepard

Chief Judge of the Maryland Court of Appeals
- In office 1883–1893
- Appointed by: William Thomas Hamilton
- Preceded by: James Lawrence Bartol
- Succeeded by: John Mitchell Robinson

Personal details
- Born: Richard Henry Alvey; March 26, 1826 St. Mary's County, Maryland, U.S.
- Died: September 14, 1906 (aged 80) Hagerstown, Maryland, U.S.

Richard Henry Alvey (March 26, 1826 – September 14, 1906), frequently known as R. H. Alvey, was an American jurist who served as chief judge of the supreme court of the State of Maryland, the Maryland Court of Appeals and subsequently served as the chief justice of the Court of Appeals of the District of Columbia.

== Education and career ==
Alvey was born in St. Mary's County, Maryland, to George and Harriet Wicklin Alvey. He read law and was admitted to the bar in 1849, and began private practice in Hagerstown, Maryland the next year. From 1844 to 1850, Alvey served as a deputy within the clerk's office of Charles County, Maryland. He was a Presidential Elector from the state of Maryland during the election of 1852. In 1861, At the outbreak of the American Civil War, he authored the Alvey Resolution, which took a strong position in favor of states' rights. As a southern sympathizer, Alvey was arrested by Union soldiers and detained.

After the Civil War, Alvey served as a delegate to the Maryland Constitutional Convention of 1867, where he was Chairman of the Committee on Representation. That same year he was a member of the Maryland General Assembly, was appointed to the Maryland Court of Appeals as an associate judge, and also as chief judge of the Fourth Judicial Circuit of Washington, Allegany, and Garrett Counties. He served in that position until 1883, when he accepted a federal judicial post.

== Federal judicial service ==
Alvey was nominated by President Grover Cleveland on April 14, 1893, to the Court of Appeals of the District of Columbia (now the United States Court of Appeals for the District of Columbia Circuit), to the new Chief Justice seat authorized by 27 Stat. 434. He was confirmed by the United States Senate on April 15, 1893, and received his commission the same day. His service terminated on January 1, 1905, due to his retirement.

=== Other service ===
In 1896, as Chief Justice, Alvey served as a member of an American commission tasked with resolving a boundary dispute between Venezuela and British Guiana. He served as chancellor of National University (now George Washington University) in Washington, D.C. from 1897 to 1904.

== Family ==
Alvey married Mary Wharton in 1856, with whom he had one child. After her death in 1860, Alvey remarried to Julia Jones Hays in 1862, with whom he had nine children. Alvey died on September 14, 1906, in Hagerstown. He was grandson of John Alvey and a descendant of John Alvey, a Revolutionary soldier in the Maryland line.

== Sources ==
- Biography from the Maryland Archives
- Johnson, Rossiter, ed. (1906). "Alvey, Richard Henry". The Biographical Dictionary of America. Vol. 1. Boston: American Biographical Society. p. 99.

Legal offices
Preceded by James Lawrence Bartol	Chief Judge of the Maryland Court of Appeals; 1883–1893	Succeeded by John Mitchell Robinson
Preceded by Seat established by 27 Stat. 434	Chief Justice of the Court of Appeals of the District of Columbia; 1893–1905	Succeeded by Seth Shepard
