= Uniontown Historic District (Uniontown, Maryland) =

Historic district in Maryland, United States

- U.S. National Register of Historic Places
- U.S. Historic district
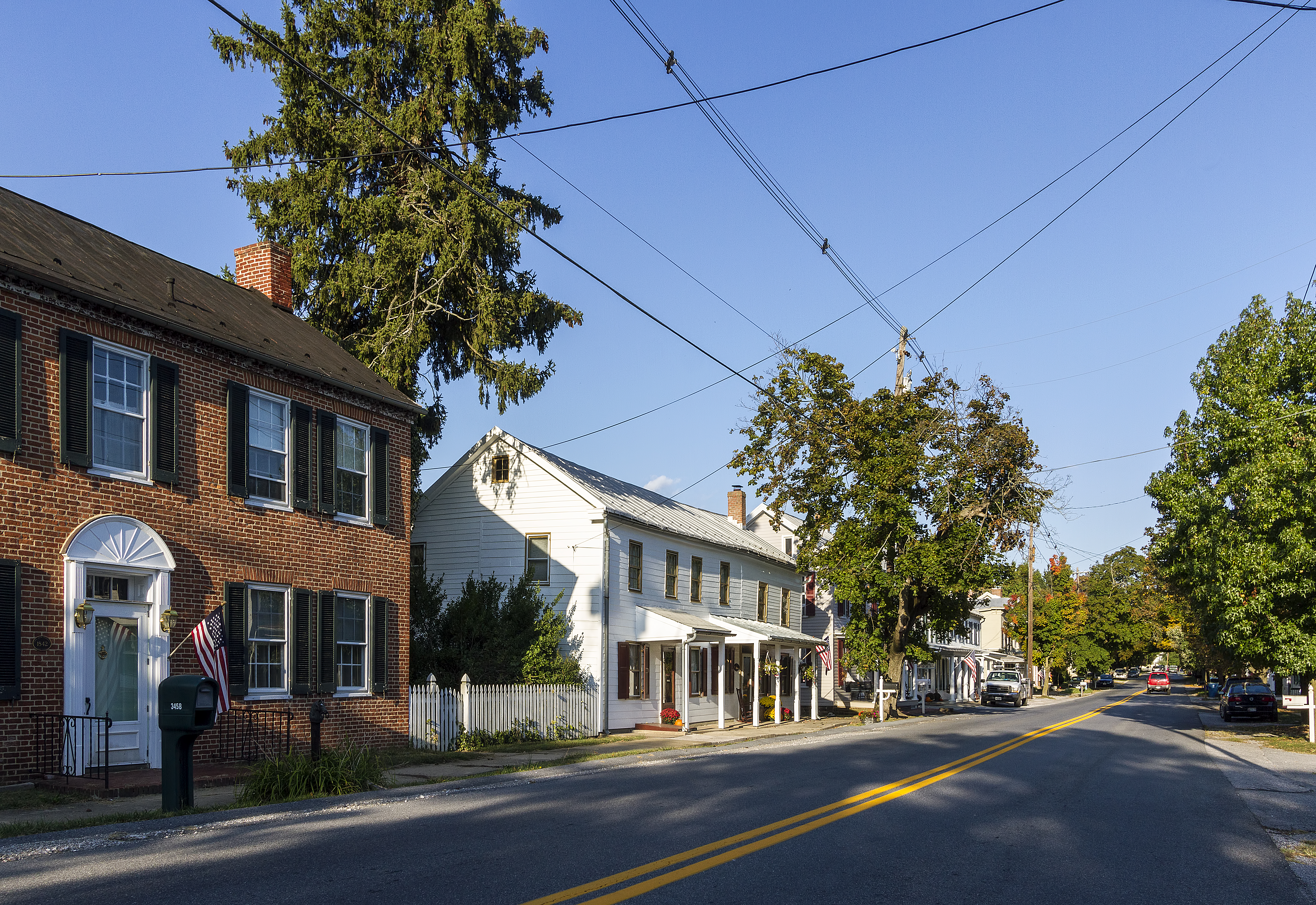

- Location within Maryland Location within the United States
- Location: Uniontown and Trevanion Rds., Uniontown, Maryland
- Coordinates: 39°35′40″N 77°6′55″W
- Area: 122 acres (49 ha)
- Architect: Multiple
- Architectural style: Mixed (more Than 2 Styles From Different Periods)
- NRHP reference No.: 86000059
- Added to NRHP: January 3, 1986

Uniontown Historic District is a national historic district at Uniontown, Carroll County, Maryland, United States. The district comprises nearly the entirety of Uniontown and contains a remarkably cohesive and well-preserved collection of houses, commercial buildings, churches, and schools reflecting the development of this agricultural village from the turn of the 19th century through the 1930s. It is an example of a linear townscape typical of small settlements in rural north-central Maryland during the 19th century.

It was added to the National Register of Historic Places in 1986.
