= Richard Bowie =

American politician and judge (1807–1881)

Richard Johns Bowie
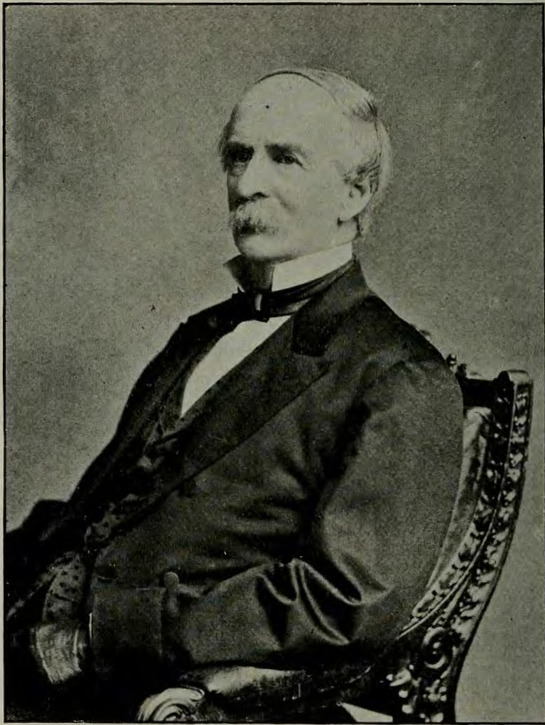

Chief Judge of the Maryland Court of Appeals
- In office 1861–1867
- Preceded by: John Carroll LeGrand
- Succeeded by: James Lawrence Bartol

Member of the U.S. House of Representatives
- In office March 4, 1849 – March 3, 1853

Member of the Maryland State Senate
- In office 1837–1841

Member of the Maryland House of Delegates
- In office 1835–1837

Personal details
- Born: June 23, 1807; Georgetown, District of Columbia, U.S.
- Died: March 12, 1881 (aged 73) Rockville, Maryland, U.S.
- Resting place: Rockville Cemetery
- Party: Whig
- Spouse: Catherine L. Williams (m. 1833)
- Education: Georgetown Law School (LL.B.)

Richard Johns Bowie (June 23, 1807 – March 12, 1881) was an American politician and jurist.

== Early life ==
Richard Johns Bowie was born on June 23, 1807, to Margaret (née Johns) and Colonel Washington Bowie in Georgetown, Washington, D. C., Bowie attended the public schools and Brookville Academy. He studied law and graduated from the Georgetown Law School in 1826 with a LL.B., commencing practice soon thereafter in the District. He was admitted to practice before the Supreme Court of the United States in 1829.

== Career ==
Bowie moved to Rockville, Maryland, engaged in agricultural pursuits, owned slaves, and also practiced law. He served as a member of the Maryland House of Delegates from 1835 to 1837, served in the Maryland State Senate from 1837 to 1841, representing the Western Shore, was delegate to the Whig National Convention at Harrisburg, Pennsylvania in 1840, and was State's attorney for Montgomery County, Maryland from 1844 to 1849.

Bowie was elected as a Whig to the Thirty-first and Thirty-second Congresses, serving from March 4, 1849, to March 3, 1853. He was an unsuccessful Whig candidate for Governor of Maryland in 1853, and resumed the practice of his profession in Rockville.

Bowie served as chief judge of the Maryland Court of Appeals from 1861 to 1867. In 1863, he was detained by Confederate general J.E.B. Stuart near Rockville, Maryland, but was released soon thereafter. He later served as chief judge of the sixth judicial circuit of Maryland, and as such also an associate judge of the court of appeals of Maryland, from November 7, 1871 until his death.

== Personal life ==
Bowie married Catherine L. Williams on May 7, 1833. He had three adopted daughters: Emma, Rose and Marie Holland. He died at Glen View, on March 12, 1881, in Montgomery County, Maryland. Bowie is interred in Rockville Cemetery.

Party political offices
Preceded by William B. Clarke	Whig nominee for Governor of Maryland; 1853	Succeeded by None
U.S. House of Representatives
Preceded by John Grant Chapman	Member of the U.S. House of Representatives from Maryland's 1st congressional district March 4, 1849 – March 3, 1853	Succeeded by John Rankin Franklin
Legal offices
Preceded by John Carroll LeGrand	Chief Judge of the Maryland Court of Appeals; 1861–1867	Succeeded by James Lawrence Bartol
