= Charles Henry Robb =

United States federal judge

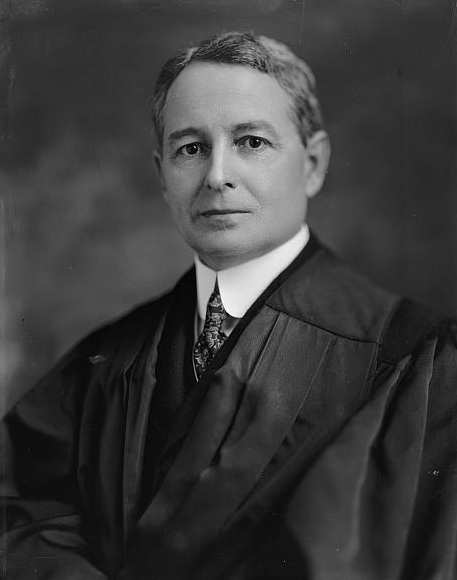

Senior Judge of the United States Court of Appeals for the District of Columbia
- In office November 15, 1937 – June 10, 1939

Associate Justice of the United States Court of Appeals for the District of Columbia
- In office October 5, 1906 – November 15, 1937
- Appointed by: Theodore Roosevelt
- Preceded by: Charles Holland Duell
- Succeeded by: Fred M. Vinson

State's Attorney of Windham County, Vermont
- In office 1896–1899
- Preceded by: Clarke C. Fitts
- Succeeded by: Herbert G. Barber

Personal details
- Born: Charles Henry Robb; November 14, 1867 Malone, New York, U.S.
- Died: June 10, 1939 (aged 71) Washington, D.C., U.S.
- Party: Republican
- Spouse: Nettie M. George (m. 1897)
- Children: 2, including Roger Robb
- Occupation: Attorney

Charles Henry Robb (November 14, 1867 – June 10, 1939) was an American lawyer from Vermont and Washington, DC. He was most notable for his service as an Associate Justice of the United States Court of Appeals for the District of Columbia.

A native of Malone, New York, Robb grew up in Lincoln, Rhode Island, Troy, New York, and Guilford, Vermont, and graduated from West Brattleboro, Vermont's Glenwood Seminary in 1886. He studied law, attained admission to the bar, and began to practice in Bellows Falls, Vermont, in 1892. A Republican, he served as Windham County, Vermont, State's Attorney for three years (1896–1899). Robb was a United States Assistant Attorney General in the United States Post Office Department from 1903 to 1904.

In 1906, Robb was appointed an associate justice of the Court of Appeals of the District of Columbia (now the United States Court of Appeals for the District of Columbia Circuit). He served until assuming senior status in 1937. Robb died in Washington, D.C., on June 10, 1939.

== Education and career ==
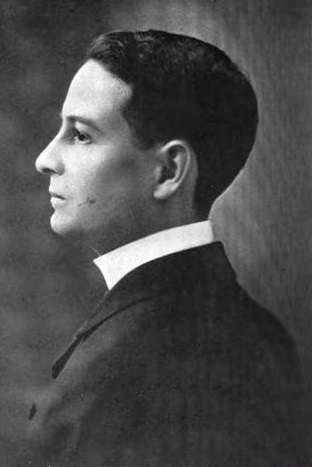
Robb as Assistant Attorney General in 1905.

Robb's original family name was spelled "Robideau", "Robadeau" and "Rubadeau". He was born in Malone, New York, the son of Isaac M. Robb and Clara Slater Matthews. He was raised in Lincoln, Rhode Island, Troy, New York, and Guilford, Vermont. Robb attended Brattleboro, Vermont's Brattleboro High School and graduated from West Brattleboro's Glenwood Seminary in 1886. He began studies for the entrance examination to attend the United States Military Academy, but decided to study law instead. He studied with the firm of Kittredge Haskins and Edgar W. Stoddard, was admitted to the bar in 1892, and practiced in Bellows Falls from 1894 to 1902. A Republican, from 1896 to 1899 he served as State's Attorney of Windham County. He then served as an attorney for the Internal Revenue Service. While practicing law in Vermont, Robb was also involved in business and banking, and was an incorporator and officer of the Bellows Falls Trust Company. He was also active in both the Vermont and American Bar Associations. From 1903 to 1904, Robb was a United States Assistant Attorney General in the United States Post Office Department, where he investigated wrongdoing and prosecuted corrupt officials. Robb served as an assistant to the United States Attorney General from 1904 to 1906.

== Federal judicial service ==
Robb received a recess appointment from President Theodore Roosevelt on October 5, 1906, to an Associate Justice seat on the Court of Appeals of the District of Columbia (now the United States Court of Appeals for the District of Columbia Circuit) which had been vacated by Charles Holland Duell. He was nominated to the same position by President Roosevelt on December 3, 1906. He was confirmed by the United States Senate on December 11, 1906, and received his commission the same day. He assumed senior status on November 15, 1937. His service terminated on June 10, 1939, due to his death in Washington, D.C.

=== Other service ===
While serving on the bench Robb was also a member of the faculty at the National University Law School (now George Washington University Law School). In 1926, National University awarded Robb the honorary degree of LL.D.

== Family ==
In 1897, Robb married Nettie M. George, the daughter of Dr. Ozias M. George of Bellows Falls. His son Roger Robb also served as a United States Circuit Judge of the United States Court of Appeals for the District of Columbia. His daughter Priscilla (October 20, 1914 – November 20, 2011) was the wife of airline pilot Elliot A. Billings (November 22, 1912 – November 7, 2011). Robb was a member of the Episcopal Church.

== See also ==
- List of United States federal judges by longevity of service

== Sources ==
Legal offices
Preceded by Charles Holland Duell	Associate Justice of the United States Court of Appeals for the District of Columbia; 1906–1937	Succeeded by Fred M. Vinson
