= Andrew Hunter Boyd =

American judge (1849–1935)

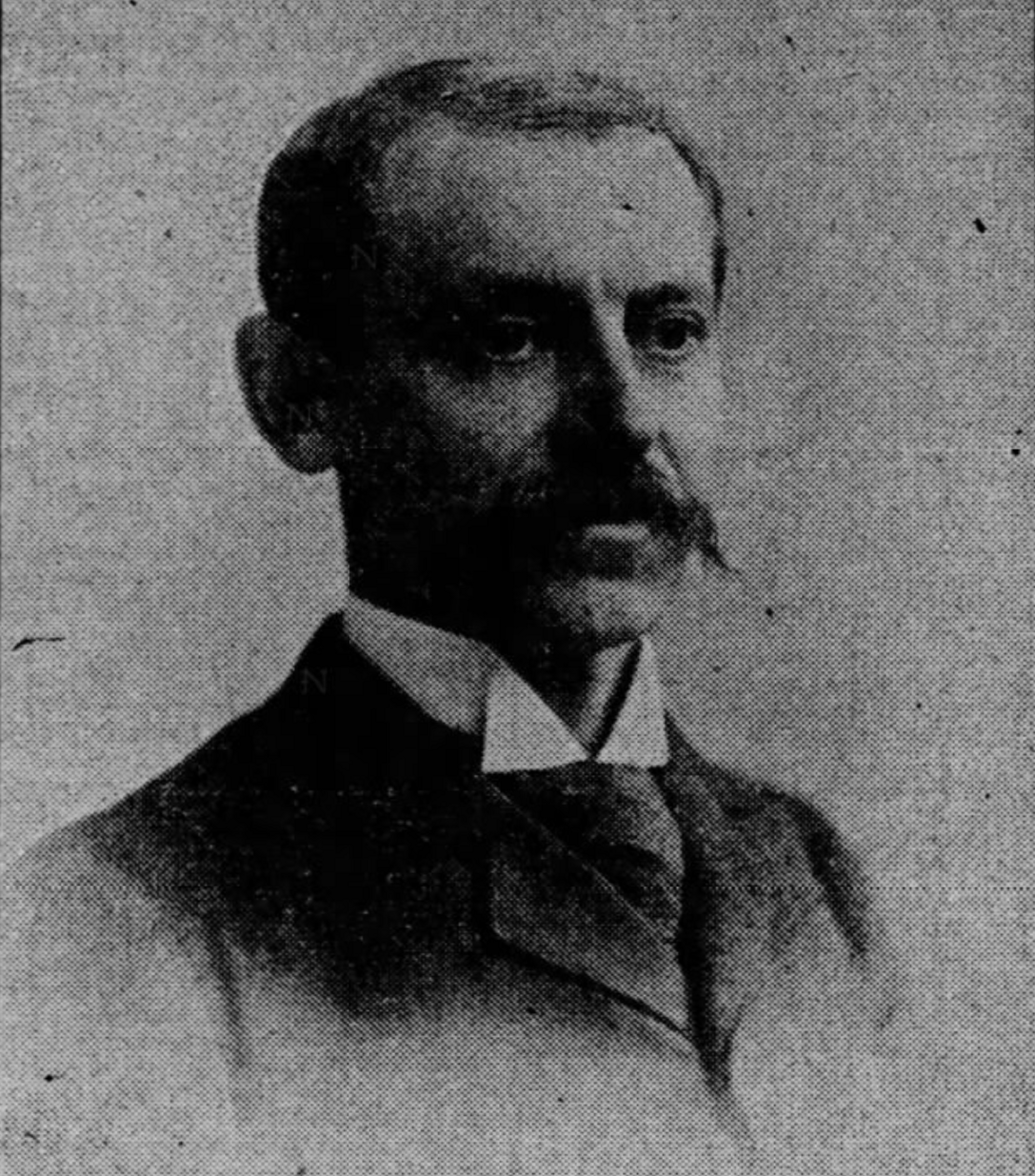
- Boyd, c. 1901

Chief Judge of the Maryland Court of Appeals
- In office 1907–1924
- Preceded by: James McSherry
- Succeeded by: Carroll Bond

Personal details
- Born: July 15, 1849 Winchester, Virginia, U.S.
- Died: August 2, 1925 (aged 76)
- Spouse: Berien M. Thurston (m. 1874)
- Education: University of Virginia (LL.B.)

Andrew Hunter Boyd (July 15, 1849 – August 2, 1925) was an American jurist who served as chief judge of the supreme court of the U.S. state of Maryland, the Court of Appeals.

== Biography ==
Boyd was born in Winchester, Virginia to Reverend A. H. H. Boyd (d. 1865). He attended Washington and Lee University from 1866 to 1868, the University of Virginia from 1868 to 1869, and in 1871 obtained his LL.B. degree from that institution.

Boyd served as deputy clerk of the office of the Allegany County, Maryland Clerk from 1869 to 1870, and practiced law in Cumberland, Maryland after 1871. He also served as state's attorney for Allegany County from 1876 to 1880.

In 1893, Boyd was appointed to the Maryland Court of Appeals as an associate judge, and also as chief judge of the Allegany County Circuit Court, 4th Judicial District. He served in those positions until 1907, when he was promoted to chief judge of the Court of Appeals, where he served until 1924.

Boyd married Berien M. Thurston in December 1874.

Legal offices
Preceded by James McSherry	Chief Judge of the Maryland Court of Appeals; 1907–1924	Succeeded by Carroll Bond
