= James Lawrence Bartol =

American judge (1813–1887)

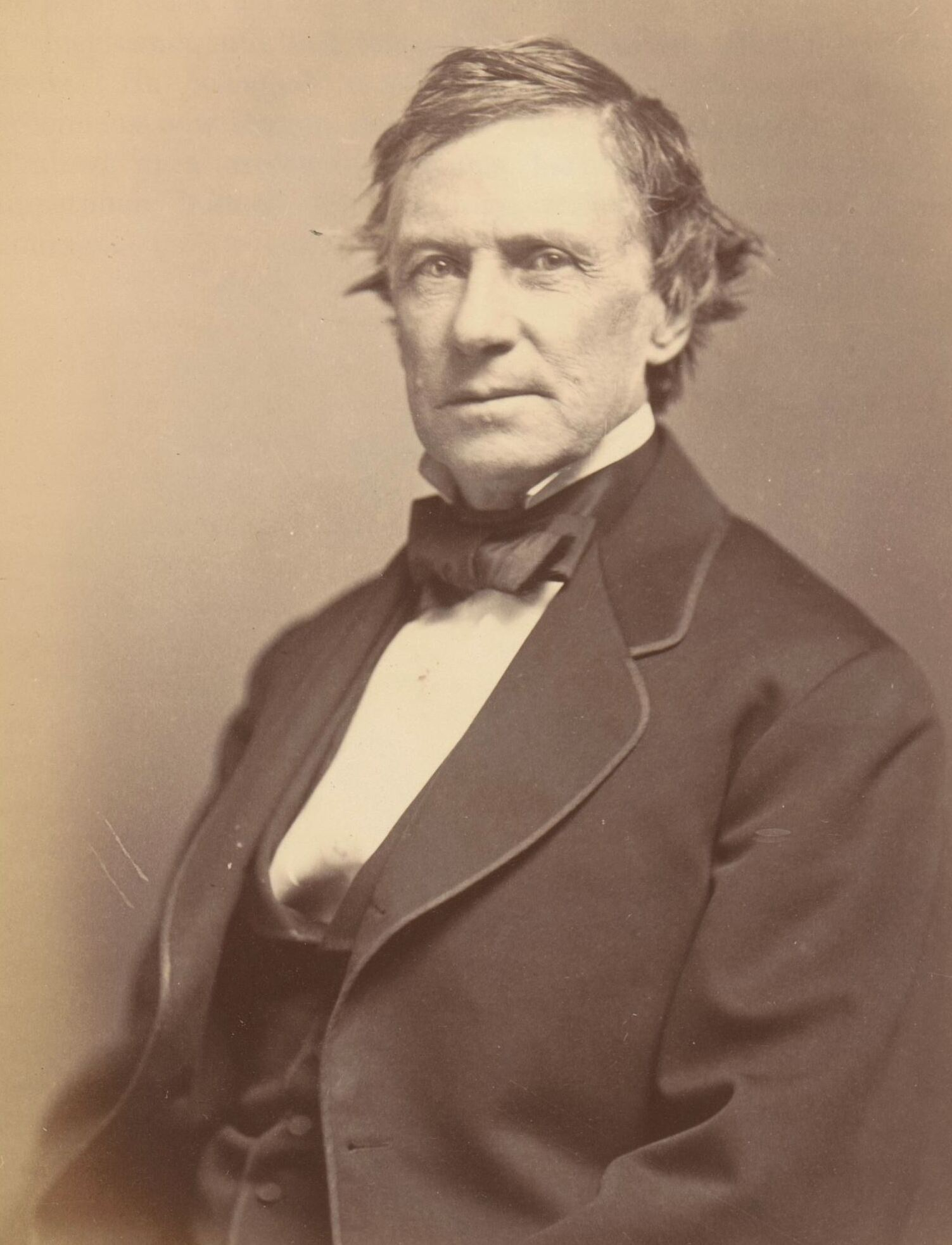
- Portrait of Bartol

Chief Judge of the Maryland Court of Appeals
- In office 1867–1883
- Preceded by: Richard Bowie
- Succeeded by: Richard H. Alvey

Personal details
- Born: June 4, 1813 Havre de Grace, Maryland, U.S.
- Died: June 23, 1887 (aged 74) Baltimore, Maryland, U.S.
- Resting place: Green Mount Cemetery; Baltimore, Maryland, U.S.
- Spouse: Corinne M. Cherbonnier
- Children: 1
- Education: Washington & Jefferson College
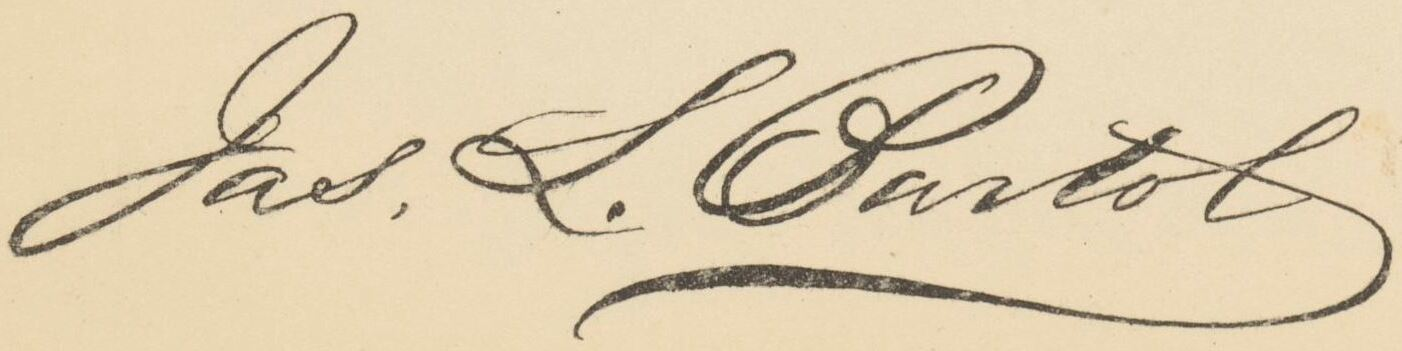
- Signature

James Lawrence Bartol (June 4, 1813 – June 23, 1887) was an American jurist from Maryland. He served as associate judge of the Maryland Court of Appeals from 1857 to 1867. He then served as chief judge of the Court of Appeals until 1883.

== Early life ==
James Lawrence Bartol was born on June 4, 1813, in Havre de Grace, Maryland, to George Bartol. His father was a merchant. At the age of 15, he went to Baltimore to become a merchant, but he left to continue his education. He was a private pupil of Samuel Martin of Chanceford Township, Pennsylvania. After graduating from Jefferson College in 1832, Bartol studied law under the tutelage of Otho Scott. He then took a trip to Cuba and Florida. He was admitted to the bar in 1836.

== Career ==
From 1836 to 1843, Bartol engaged in law practice in Denton, Maryland, where he helped to establish the Denton Academy. In 1845, he moved to Baltimore to practice law. Under the 1851 constitution, he was selected as a special judge. In 1855, he moved to Baltimore County. In 1857, he was appointed by Governor Thomas Watkins Ligon as a judge of the Maryland Court of Appeals, succeeding John Thomson Mason Jr. He was then elected in 1857 to the position. From 1857 to 1867, he served as Associate Judge of the Maryland Court of Appeals, and from 1867 to 1883 as Chief Judge. He moved back to Baltimore in 1867. In 1881, he resigned and then was re-elected for a 15-year term, extending his service beyond the 70 year age limit for judges. He became ill and was not on the bench for 12 months, but returned on October 9, 1883. On October 15, 1883, he became ill and had to withdraw from Annapolis back to Baltimore, and he tendered his resignation on October 27, 1883. He was succeeded by the appointment of Richard H. Alvey as chief judge and William Shepard Bryan filled the vacancy in the court. His cases included the habeas corpus cases of Baltimore police commissioners William T. Valiant and James Young.

== Personal life ==
Bartol married Corinne M. Cherbonnier, daughter of Pierre Cherbonnier. They had at least one daughter. He lived on Bolton Street in Baltimore.

Bartol became sick and was confined to his room since December 1885. He died from bronchitis on June 23, 1887, at the home of his son-in-law in Baltimore. He was buried in Green Mount Cemetery in Baltimore.

== Awards ==
In 1871, Bartol received an honorary Doctor of Laws degree from St. John's College.

Legal offices
Preceded by Richard Bowie	Chief Judge of the Maryland Court of Appeals; 1867–1883	Succeeded by Richard H. Alvey
