= Roger Robb =

American judge

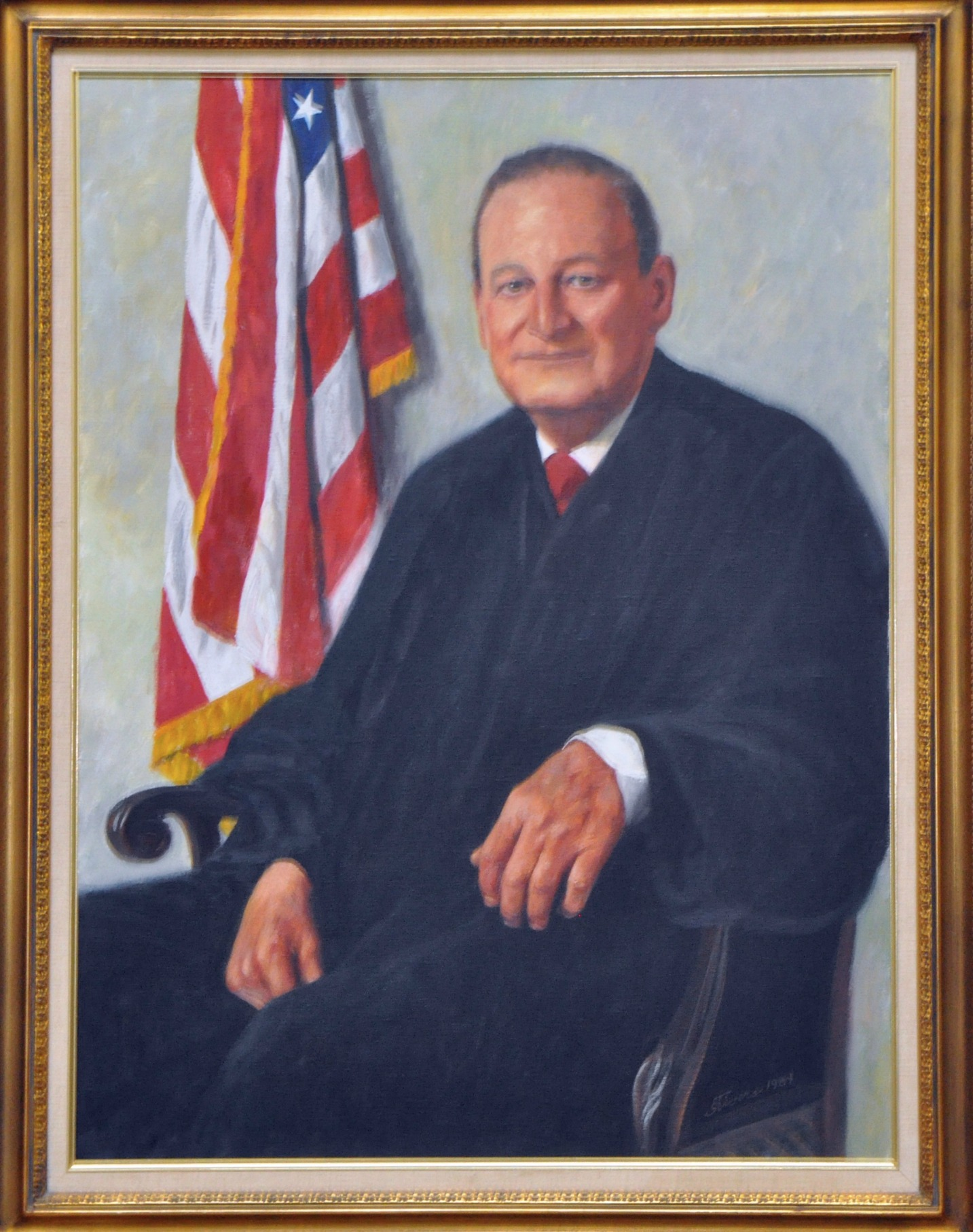

Senior Judge of the United States Court of Appeals for the District of Columbia Circuit
- In office May 31, 1982 – December 19, 1985

Judge of the United States Court of Appeals for the District of Columbia Circuit
- In office May 6, 1969 – May 31, 1982
- Appointed by: Richard Nixon
- Preceded by: John A. Danaher
- Succeeded by: Antonin Scalia

Personal details
- Born: July 7, 1907 Bellows Falls, Vermont, U.S.
- Died: December 19, 1985 (aged 78) Washington, D.C., U.S.
- Party: Republican
- Parent: Charles Henry Robb (father)
- Education: Yale University (BA, LLB)

Roger Robb (July 7, 1907 – December 19, 1985) was a United States circuit judge of the United States Court of Appeals for the District of Columbia Circuit, anti-communist, and trial attorney. He served as special counsel to an Atomic Energy Commission hearing that led to revocation of J. Robert Oppenheimer's security clearance in 1954.

== Early life and education ==
Robb was born in Bellows Falls, Vermont, the son of Court of Appeals Judge Charles Henry Robb and Nettie M. (George) Robb. He received a BA degree (Phi Beta Kappa) from Yale University in 1928. He received a LL.B. from Yale Law School in 1931. He was an Assistant United States Attorney for the District of Columbia from 1931 to 1938.

== Career ==
Robb was in private practice in Washington, D.C. from 1938 to 1969.

=== Notable cases ===
Robb was the court-appointed attorney for Earl Browder, a leader of the Communist Party, in a Contempt of Congress case in 1950, earning praise from Browder despite their political differences. He also successfully defended Otto Otepka, a former State Department official accused of giving unauthorized material to a Senate committee.

Robb was special counsel to the Atomic Energy Commission at an AEC hearing on the loyalty of J. Robert Oppenheimer, the director of the Manhattan Project. Over the course of four weeks, Robb and the AEC panel interrogated Oppenheimer and other witnesses on his past affiliations with Communists, with Robb operating with ruthless, aggressive prosecutorial tactics which were described by legal historians and biographers widely as an abuse of administrative power. One observer commented that Robb "did not treat Oppenheimer as a witness in his own case, but as a person charged with high treason." The board ultimately voted 2–1 to strip Oppenheimer of his security clearance.

In 1969, Robb represented Barry Goldwater in his libel suit against Ralph Ginzburg and Fact magazine, which had claimed that Goldwater was mentally unstable. The jury awarded Goldwater $1 in compensatory damages and $75,000 in punitive damages, which was upheld on appeal.

=== Federal judicial service ===
Robb was nominated by President Richard Nixon on April 23, 1969, to a seat on the United States Court of Appeals for the District of Columbia Circuit vacated by Judge John A. Danaher. He was confirmed by the United States Senate on May 5, 1969, and received his commission on May 6, 1969. He assumed senior status on May 31, 1982, and was succeeded by Judge Antonin Scalia. He served in this position until his death on December 19, 1985.

== Personal life ==
Robb was married three times. His first two wives, Mary Ernst Cooper and Lillian Nordstrom predeceased him. His third wife Irene Rice, survived him. He had a son. His grandson is the writer Daniel Robb.

== Film portrayals ==
On television, Robb was portrayed by Philip O'Brien in the final episode of the 1980 BBC miniseries Oppenheimer, and by Michael Cumpsty in The Trials of J. Robert Oppenheimer, a 2009 episode of the PBS series The American Experience.

Jason Clarke played Robb in Christopher Nolan's 2023 film Oppenheimer.

Legal offices
Preceded by John A. Danaher	Judge of the United States Court of Appeals for the District of Columbia Circuit; 1969–1982	Succeeded by Antonin Scalia
