= John Carroll LeGrand =

American judge (1814–1861)

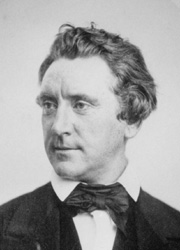

Chief Judge of the Maryland Court of Appeals
- In office 1851–1861
- Preceded by: Thomas Beale Dorsey
- Succeeded by: Richard Bowie

Secretary of State of Maryland
- In office 1842–1844

Speaker of the Maryland House of Delegates
- In office 1841
- Preceded by: Daniel S. Biser
- Succeeded by: Daniel S. Biser

Member of the Maryland House of Delegates
- In office 1839–1841

Personal details
- Born: 1814 Baltimore, Maryland, U.S.
- Died: December 28, 1861 (aged 46–47)
- Resting place: Green Mount Cemetery; Baltimore, Maryland, U.S.

John Carroll LeGrand (1814 – December 28, 1861) was an American politician and jurist who served as chief judge of the supreme court of the U.S. state of Maryland, the Court of Appeals, and as Speaker of the Maryland House of Delegates.

== Early life ==
LeGrand was born in 1814, in Baltimore, Maryland to Samuel D. LeGrand. He attended private school, studied law under James M. Buchanan, and was admitted to the bar around 1837.

LeGrand served as a member of the Maryland House of Delegates from 1839 to 1841, including a period as Speaker in 1841. He later served as Secretary of State of Maryland from 1842 to 1844, and wrote a book, Oration on the Landing of the Pilgrims of Maryland which was published in May 1843.

From 1844 to 1851, LeGrand served as Associate Judge of the Sixth Judicial Circuit of Maryland. In 1851, he was appointed Chief Judge of the Maryland Court of Appeals, where he served until 1861. LeGrand was defeated for re-election by Unionist candidate Silas Morris Cochran, after a letter he wrote to the Baltimore Sun calling for Maryland to secede from the United States was publicized.

LeGrand never married. He died on December 28, 1861, and is interred in Green Mount Cemetery.

Political offices
| Preceded by Daniel S. Biser | Speaker of the Maryland House of Delegates; 1841 | Succeeded by Daniel S. Biser |
| Preceded by Henry Hobbs | Secretary of State of Maryland; 1842–1844 | Succeeded by John N. Watkins |
Legal offices
| Preceded by Thomas Beale Dorsey | Chief Judge of the Maryland Court of Appeals; 1851–1861 | Succeeded by Richard Bowie |
