= Tyrone, Maryland =

Village in Carroll County

Tyrone, Maryland is a "rural village" in Carroll County, Maryland, United States, located along Maryland Route 832, the Old Taneytown Road, in the vicinity of the Meadow Branch of Big Pipe Creek. Tyrone is part of the "Old Main Streets Scenic Byway, a 111-mile, three-to-four-hour adventure from Emmitsburg east to the City of Westminster, south to Mount Airy, west to Thurmont, before heading back north to Emmitsburg." Tyrone is located at about the halfway point on the road between Taneytown and Westminster.

The major landmark in Tyrone is Emmanuel Baust Lutheran Church. The church community dates to 1765, when it was founded by German immigrants on land donated by farmer Valentine Baust. The current building, the third house of worship built on the site and a structure used by multiple denominations, was dedicated in 1908.
