= Fort Dearborn (Mississippi) =

Territorial-era blockhouse

Coordinates: 31.593°N 91.299°W

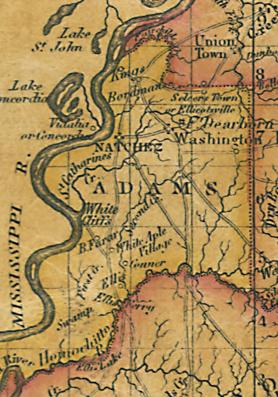
1819 map by John Melish of Adams County, Mississippi

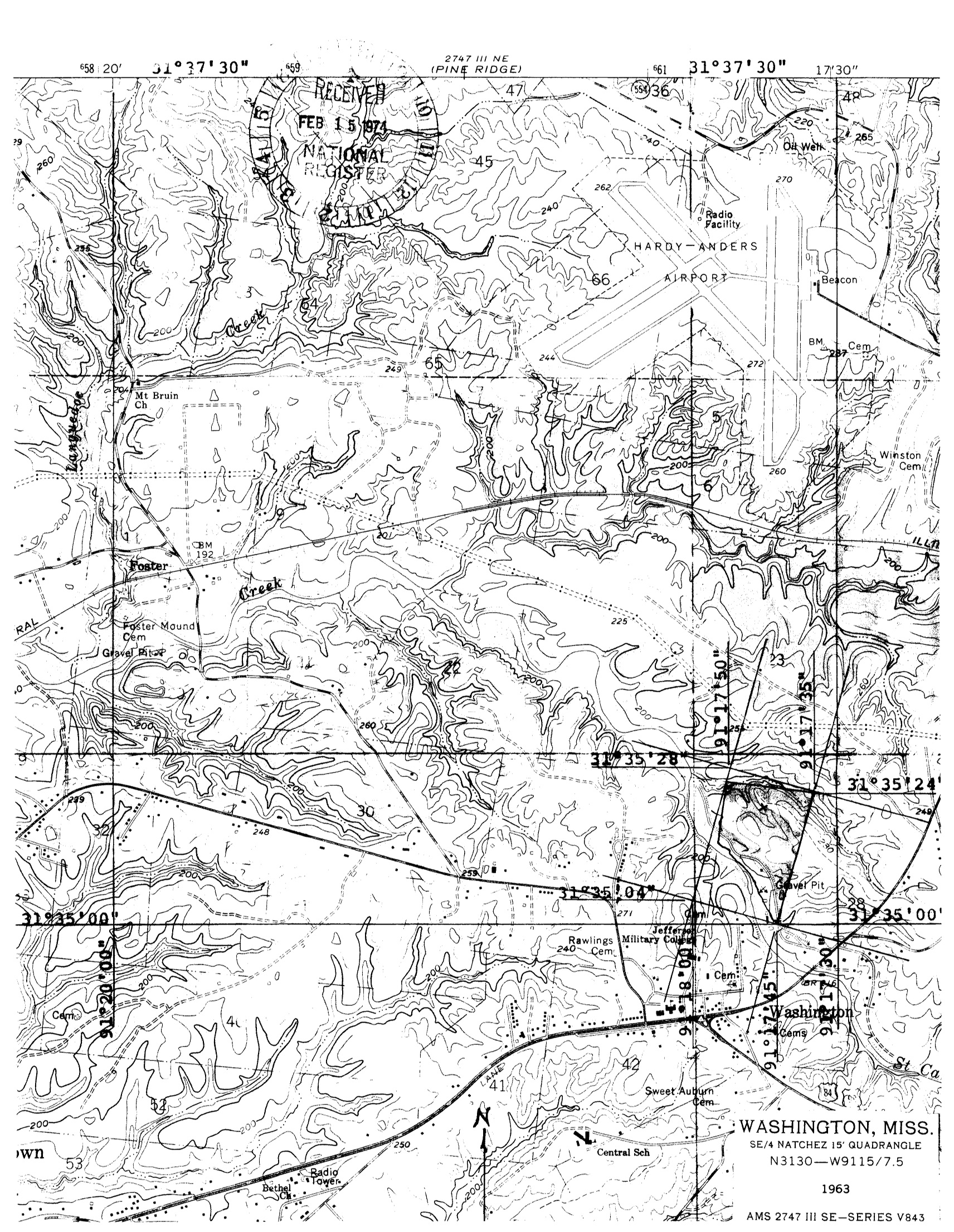
Fort Dearborn (Mississippi) location map created 1974

Fort Dearborn, also known as Washington Cantonment, was a U.S. Army base in Mississippi Territory on the Natchez Trace in Adams County near the territorial capital of Washington. Established in 1802 or 1803, the fort was used as a base during the War of 1812.

== History ==
With approval from Thomas Jefferson and U.S. Secretary of War Henry Dearborn, territorial governor William C. C. Claiborne ordered construction of a blockhouse "about 400 yards from his house" on land donated by Joseph Calvit. According to Mississippi historian Dunbar Rowland, "Fort Dearborn and Jefferson College were the outstanding institutions of the territorial capital," which also hosted "the land office, the Surveyor-General's office, the office of the Commissioners of Claims, [and] the Courts of the United States."

The fort held British prisoners during the War of 1812 but was abandoned between the end of the war and Mississippi statehood in 1817.

The fort was sited on the "north bank of St. Catherine's Creek" in the vicinity of present-day U.S. Route 61. According to the U.S. National Park Service, "The site of Fort Dearborn is near the end of a plateau which is surrounded by ravines on three sides. The ravines were used by the garrison as dumps during the fort's occupation. The fort was constructed of wood with the exception of the fireplaces which were brick. The site of Fort Dearborn has changed little since 1858, when Benjamin L. C. Wailes described it in his diary: 'The outline of the barracks can be seen by scraps of nails, pieces of brick, fragments of glass, pottery and crockery and military buttons, etc."
