= James McSherry (Maryland judge) =

American judge (1842–1907)

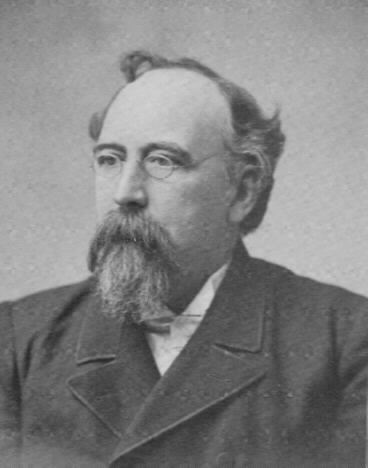

Chief Judge of the Maryland Court of Appeals
- In office 1896–1907
- Preceded by: John Mitchell Robinson
- Succeeded by: Andrew Hunter Boyd

Personal details
- Born: December 30, 1842 Frederick, Maryland, U.S.
- Died: October 23, 1907 (aged 64)
- Spouse: Clara Louise McAleer (m. 1866)
- Children: 6
- Parent: James McSherry Jr. (father)

James McSherry (December 30, 1842 – October 23, 1907) was an American jurist who served as chief judge of the supreme court of the U.S. state of Maryland, the Court of Appeals.

== Biography ==
McSherry was born in Frederick, Frederick County, Maryland to James McSherry Jr. and Eliza Spurrier McSherry. He attended St. John's Literary Institute of Frederick from 1850 to 1856, and Mount Saint Mary's College from 1856 to 1861. He began the study of law in 1861, and was admitted to the Maryland Bar in 1864. In 1867, he was appointed a commissioner of the Frederick and Pennsylvania Line Railroad. He remained active in the management of the railroad up thru its demise in 1896.

During the American Civil War, McSherry was a Confederate sympathizer. He practiced law in Frederick, until he was appointed concurrently Chief Judge of the Frederick County Circuit Court (Sixth Judicial Circuit) and Associate Judge of the Maryland Court of Appeals in 1887. He was promoted to Chief Judge of the Court of Appeals in 1896, where he served until his death at his home in 1907.

While serving as Chief Judge, McSherry was a member of the executive committee of the State House Building Commission. The Committee oversaw the construction of the present day annex to the Maryland State House.

McSherry married Clara Louise McAleer on February 21, 1866, with whom he had one son and five daughters.

Legal offices
Preceded by John Mitchell Robinson	Chief Judge of the Maryland Court of Appeals; 1896–1907	Succeeded by Andrew Hunter Boyd
