= Libertytown, Maryland =

- Census-designated place
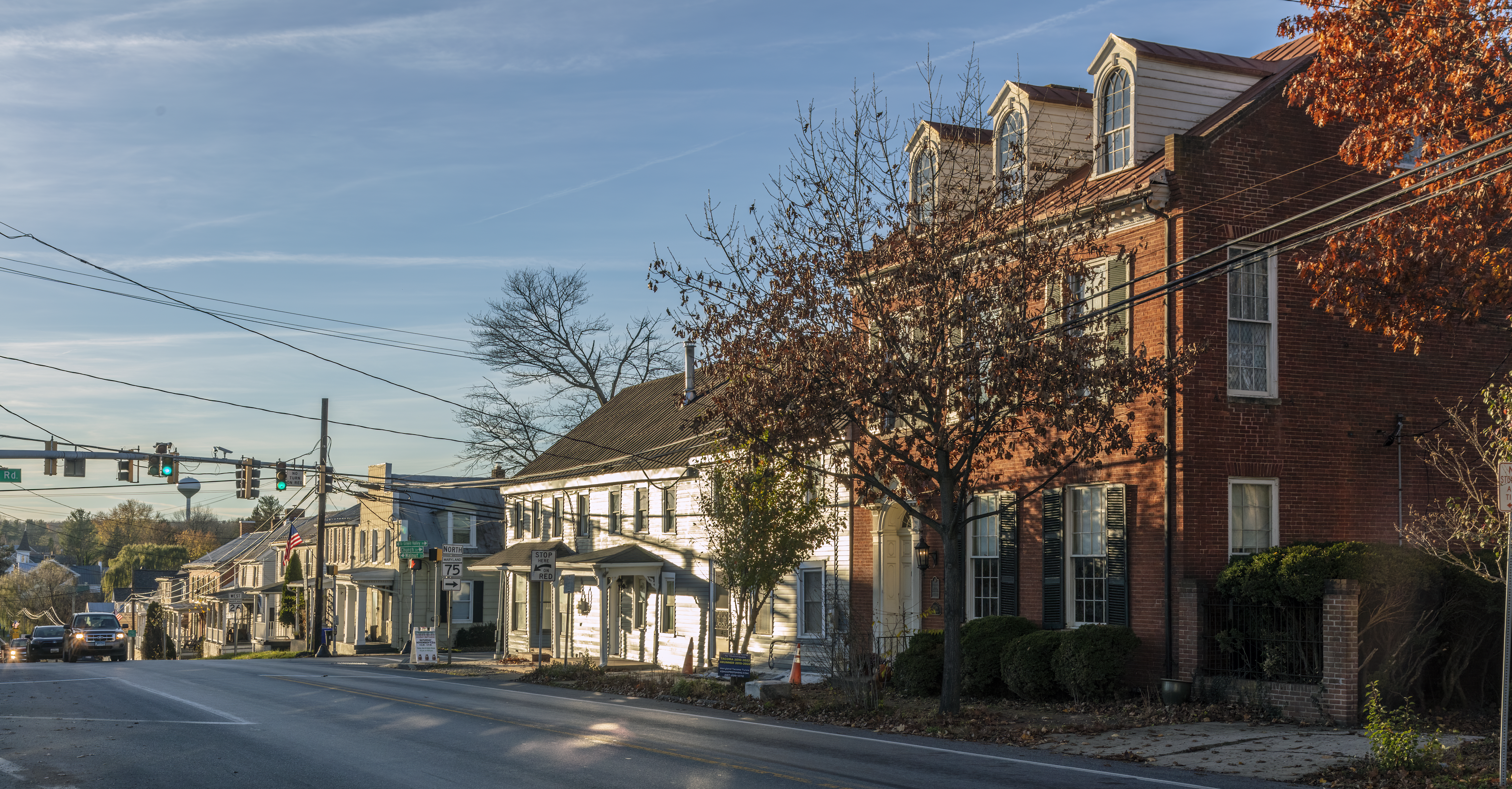
- Central Libertytown in 2022

- Location in Maryland Libertytown (the United States)
- Coordinates: 39°29′14″N 77°15′20″W
- Country: United States
- State: Maryland
- County: Frederick

Area
  - Total: 2.41 sq mi (6.25 km^{2})
  - Land: 2.41 sq mi (6.24 km^{2})
  - Water: 0.0039 sq mi (0.01 km^{2})
- Elevation: 548 ft (167 m)

Population (2020)
  - Total: 984
  - Density: 408.6/sq mi (157.77/km^{2})
- Time zone: UTC−5 (Eastern (EST))
  - Summer (DST): UTC−4 (EDT)
- ZIP code: 21762 Post Office, 21791 and 21701, RFD
- Area codes: 301 and 240, Walkersville and Frederick Exchanges, Telephone exchange names
- FIPS code: 24-46800
- GNIS feature ID: 2583649

Libertytown is an unincorporated community and census-designated place (CDP) in Frederick County, in the U.S. state of Maryland. As of the 2010 census it had a population of 950. The Abraham Jones House was listed on the National Register of Historic Places in 1973.

== Geography ==
The community is in eastern Frederick County, along Maryland Route 26 (Liberty Road), which leads east 34 miles (55 km) to Baltimore and southwest 11 miles (18 km) to Frederick. Maryland Route 75 crosses MD 26 in the center of town, leading northeast 8 miles (13 km) to Union Bridge and south 7 miles (11 km) to New Market. Maryland Route 31 intersects MD 26 on the east edge of town and leads northeast 17 miles (27 km) to Westminster. Maryland Route 550 leaves MD 26 in the western part of town and leads northwest 5 miles (8 km) to Woodsboro.

According to the U.S. Census Bureau, the Libertytown CDP has a total area of 2.4 square miles (6.3 km^{2}), of which 0.006 square miles (0.015 km^{2}), or 0.23%, is water.

== Demographics ==
Historical population
Census	Pop.	Note	%±
2010	950		—
2020	984		3.6%
U.S. Decennial Census

From 2010 to 2020, the population of Libertytown increased by 3.6%.

== Education ==
It is in Frederick County Public Schools.

School zoning is as follows: Residents are zoned to Liberty Elementary School, New Market Middle School, and Linganore High School.

Libertytown is the location of Liberty Elementary School. Liberty School opened its doors in 1927, teaching grades 1 through 12. In 1945, Liberty graduated its final senior class and continued teaching junior high until 1962.

Notre Dame Academy is a Catholic elementary school in Libertytown.

== Recreation ==
Libertytown Park contains picnic gazebos and a county maintained rain garden. This regional park also has two baseball fields: one for Little League and another regulation-sized baseball field. Additional facilities include a basketball court, three tennis courts, and a large field space for football or soccer. A very popular spot among locals is Dirty Dixon’s. It only is accessible from within the park, but also is accessible off Dollyhide Road with additional parking. The trails runs through a native bobwhite quail protection area maintained by Quail Forever.
