= Erek Barron =

American politician & attorney (born 1974)

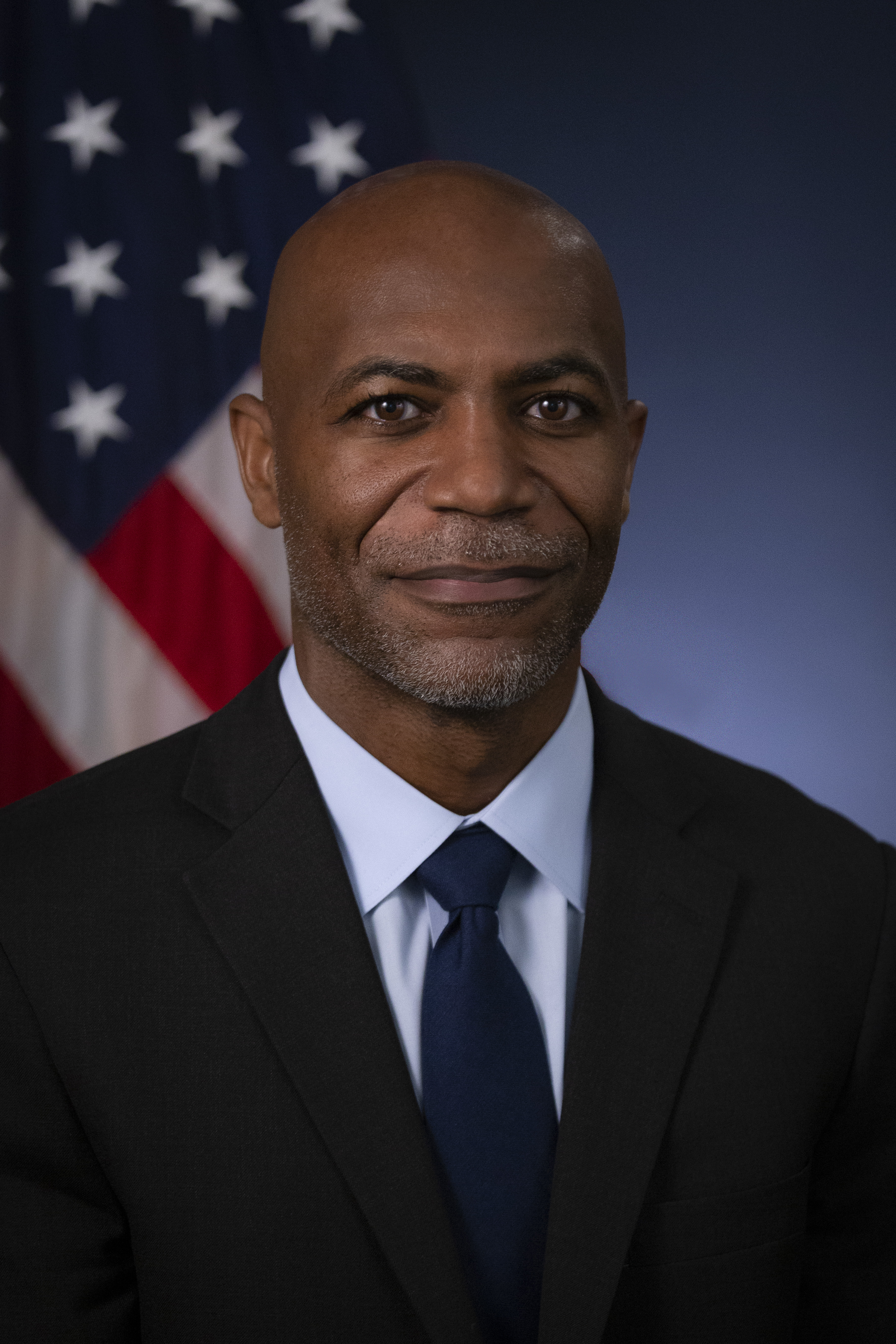
- Official portrait, 2021

United States Attorney for the District of Maryland
- In office October 7, 2021 – February 12, 2025
- President: Joe Biden; Donald Trump
- Preceded by: Robert Hur
- Succeeded by: Phil Selden (acting)

Member of the Maryland House of Delegates from the 24th district
- In office January 14, 2015 – October 7, 2021 Serving with Carolyn J. B. Howard, Michael L. Vaughn, Andrea Harrison, and Jazz Lewis
- Preceded by: Darren Swain
- Succeeded by: Faye Martin Howell
- Constituency: Prince George's County, Maryland

Personal details
- Born: 1974 (age 51–52) Washington, D.C., U.S.
- Party: Democratic
- Education: University of Maryland, College Park (BA); George Washington University (JD); Georgetown University (LLM)

Erek Lawrence Barron (born 1974) is an American attorney who served as the United States Attorney for the District of Maryland from 2021 to 2025. He was a member of the Maryland House of Delegates from 2015 to 2021, representing District 24 in Prince George's County, while practicing law as a private attorney. Barron was the first African American to serve as U.S. Attorney in Maryland. Prior to elected office, he served as a prosecutor at the state and federal levels and worked as a policy advisor in the U.S. Senate.

== Early life and education ==
Barron was born in 1974 in Washington, D.C. He attended the Episcopal High School in Alexandria, Virginia. In 1996, he graduated from the University of Maryland, College Park with a Bachelor of Arts degree in English. He earned a Juris Doctor from the George Washington University Law School in 1999 and was admitted to the Maryland Bar the same year. In 2007, he obtained a Master of Laws (LL.M.) in International and National Security Law from the Georgetown University Law Center.

== Career ==
Barron began his legal career as local prosecutor, serving as an assistant state's attorney for Prince George's County and Baltimore City from 2001 to 2006. From 2006 to 2007, he was a trial attorney in the United States Department of Justice. He then worked as counsel and policy advisor to Senator Joe Biden on the Senate Judiciary Committee from 2007 to 2009.

=== Private practice ===
After leaving government in 2009, Barron practised law with Whiteford, Taylor & Preston where he focused on civil, criminal, and appellate litigation. As a member of the Criminal Justice Act panels in Maryland and Washington, D.C. and as a member of the American Bar Association Death Penalty Representation Steering Committee Project, Barron secured notable reversals of criminal convictions, including in January 2015 where the Delaware Supreme Court in McCoy v. State overturned a capital murder conviction and death sentence based on prosecutorial misconduct and voir dire errors. The prosecutor in the case was subsequently suspended for misconduct in the case.

=== Maryland legislature (2014–2021) ===
Barron first won election to the Maryland House of Delegates in 2014 to represent District 24 in Prince George's County and was sworn into office on January 14, 2015. In his first year, he and three other male legislators joined the Women's Legislators of Maryland Caucus, becoming the first men in the United States to join a women's caucus. Barron was also a member of the Legislative Black Caucus of Maryland.

During his tenure, Barron served on the House Health and Government Operations Committee and the Legislative Policy Committee. His legislative work focused on criminal justice reform, public health, and government accountability. He was a member of the Maryland Justice Reinvestment Coordinating Council and a lead sponsor of the Justice Reinvestment Act, an evidence-based, bipartisan measure enacted in 2016 that developed a statewide framework of sentencing and corrections policies to enhance public safety while reducing unnecessary and costly incarceration and reinvesting savings into treatment and reentry programs.

In 2019, Speaker of the Maryland House of Delegates Adrienne A. Jones appointed Barron as co-chair of the Joint Committee on Fair Practices and State Personnel Oversight. He later led an investigation into the $233,647 severance package paid to Roy McGrath, the former director of the Maryland Environmental Service and chief of staff of Governor Larry Hogan. Barron later recused himself from the McGrath case after becoming U.S. attorney, citing his role in the investigation.

==== Committee assignments ====
- Co-chair, Joint Committee on Fair Practices and State Personnel Oversight, 2019–2021
- Member, Health and Government Operations Committee, 2015–2021 (Health Facilities & Occupations Subcommittee, 2015–2016; Government Operations & Long-Term Care Subcommittee, 2015–2017; Estates & Trusts subcommittee, 2016–2017; Government Operations & Estates & Trusts Subcommittee, 2017–2019; Public Health & Minority Health Disparities Subcommittee, 2017–2021; Government Operations & Health Facilities Subcommittee, 2020–2021)
- Member, Legislative Policy Committee, 2020–2021

=== United States Attorney for Maryland (2021–2025) ===
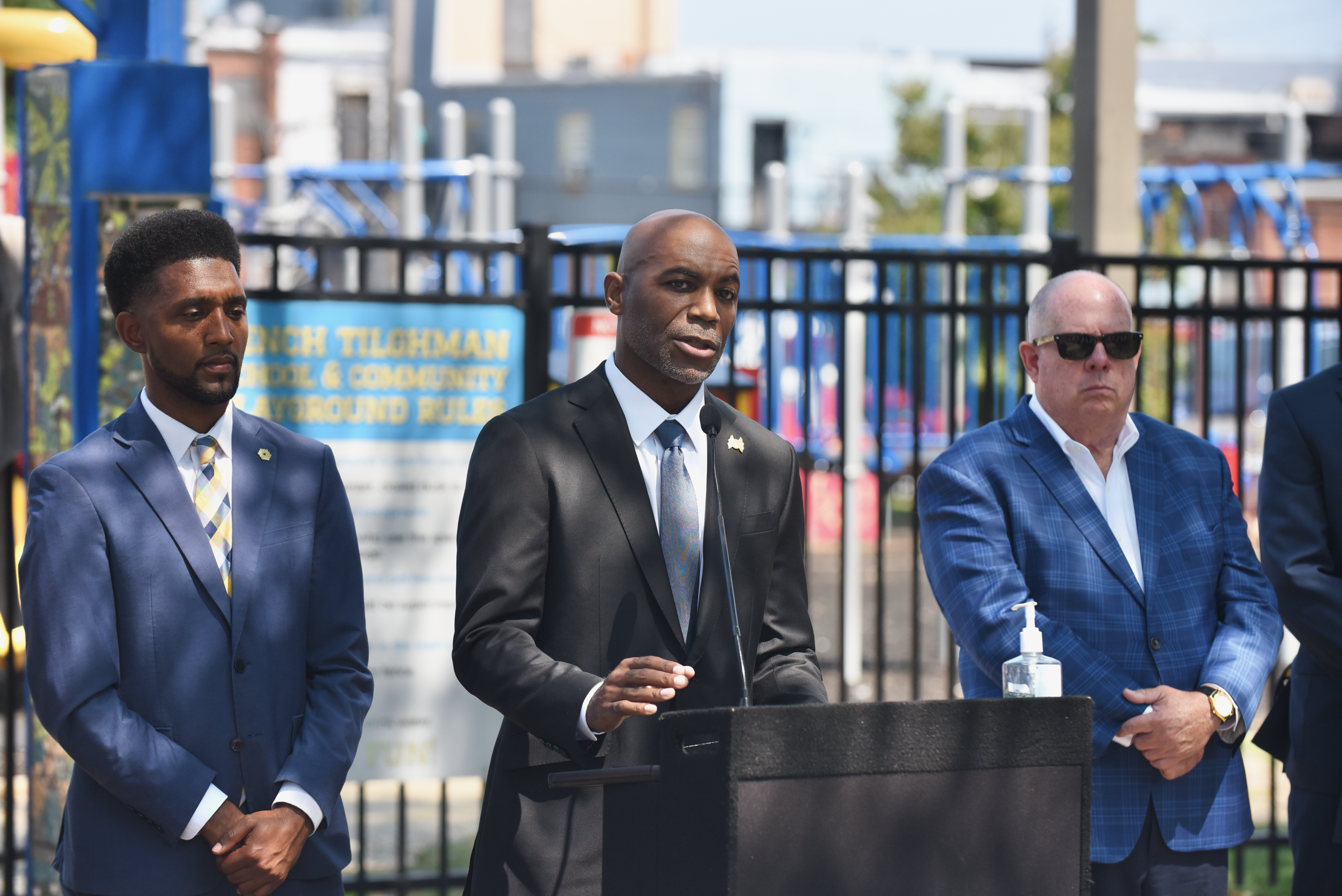
Barron speaks at a press conference on violent crime in Baltimore with Mayor Brandon Scott (left) and Governor Larry Hogan (right), 2022

On July 26, 2021, Barron was nominated by President Joe Biden to serve as United States Attorney for the District of Maryland. His nomination was reported out of committee by voice vote on September 23, 2021, and confirmed by the U.S. Senate by voice vote on September 30, 2021. He was sworn into office on October 7, 2021, by Chief Judge James K. Bredar, succeeding acting U.S. Attorney Jonathan F. Lenzner. Barron became the first African American to hold the position in Maryland.

As U.S. Attorney, Barron employed a plan to address violent crime in Baltimore which included State-funded hires for the office's newly established violent and organised crime section, active review of firearms cases for federal adoption, pursuing repeat violent offenders through an "Al Capone model of prosecution," including "for any and all wrongdoing that meets our priorities, especially fraud," and targeted community-based partnerships focused on at-risk youth and reentry.

His office partnered with state and local officials to prosecute violent crime, contributing to significant decreases in homicides and non-fatal shootings in Baltimore in 2023 and 2024, as well as a 41% decrease in statewide homicides from 2021 to 2024. Barron's office also focused on prosecuting COVID-19-related fraud and he led efforts to diversify the U.S. Attorney's Office, which had been predominantly White and faced accusations of failing to reflect the demographics of Maryland.

He oversaw several high-profile cases, including federal prosecutions of former Baltimore State's Attorney Marilyn Mosby, former Maryland Environmental Service director and gubernatorial chief of staff Roy McGrath, and Baltimore attorney Stephen Snyder. The office also filed charges against Frederick County Sheriff Chuck Jenkins for allegedly conspiring to obtain machine guns unlawfully. In 2024, the office participated in legal actions related to the collapse of the Francis Scott Key Bridge collapse.

In January 2025, Bloomberg Law reported that the Maryland U.S. Attorney's Office had experienced a significant reduction in criminal case filings during Barron's tenure, citing Justice Department data showing the lowest levels in five decades. The report noted that some current and former employees had raised concerns about internal management and communication. However, a subsequent Law360 report noted Barron's efforts at improving stakeholder relations and oversight, saying that he made "cultural changes within the office, moving to 'rein in' some entrenched senior level prosecutors" who believed they "were not subject to any particular supervision."

In the final months of his tenure, consensus built among Democratic and Republican leaders in Maryland, including with U.S. Representatives Kweisi Mfume and Andy Harris, Baltimore State's Attorney Ivan Bates, and civil rights attorney Billy Murphy Jr., advocated for his continuing to serve under the incoming Trump administration. But, the effort failed and Barron resigned on February 12, 2025. Barron was lauded by local and state officials and editorial boards for his collaborative efforts and selfless leadership style.

Barron was succeeded by First Assistant Phil Selden, followed by the appointment of Kelly O. Hayes by Attorney General Pam Bondi as the interim U.S. attorney.

=== Post-U.S. Attorney career ===
In May 2025, Barron joined the law firm Mintz, Levin, Cohn, Ferris, Glovsky, and Popeo as part of its white collar defense and government investigations practice. He leads Mintz's Crisis Management and Strategic Response team, and his practice focuses on complex civil, criminal, and regulatory matters.

In September 2025, Barron was announced as the chairman of Brooke Lierman's 2026 re-election campaign. In July 2026, he was appointed chair of the Maryland Access to Justice Commission.

== Legislative work and political engagement ==
=== Criminal justice ===
In the 2016 session, Barron advocated for repealing mandatory minimum sentencing laws as part of the Justice Reinvestment Act. The House Judiciary Committee adopted the bipartisan "Barron-Wilson amendment," which repealed mandatory minimums for nonviolent drug offences while increasing penalties for leaders of gangs and organized crime. He also introduced legislation to prohibit both public and private colleges and universities from including questions about applicants' criminal histories on admission forms.

In August 2016, Barron and four other state legislators sent a joint letter to Attorney General Brian Frosh to review the constitutionality of setting bail without considering whether a defendant could afford to pay under the 14th Amendment. The Attorney General's office responded to the letter in October by issuing an opinion stating that such a system was a possible violation of due process. In November, the Standing Committee on Rules of Practice and Procedure of the Maryland Court of Appeals voted 18–5 to recommend a policy change to prohibit Maryland judges from setting bail that is too high for defendants to pay unless the defendant is considered a flight risk or a danger to society. In February 2017, the Court of Appeals voted unanimously to adopt the rule change. During the 2017 legislative session, Barron sought to enshrine the court rule change into law.

A major focus for Barron in the legislature was pretrial detention. In August 2016, Barron led four other legislators in urging Attorney General Brian Frosh to review the constitutionality of cash bail practices under the 14th Amendment. The Attorney General's office later issued an opinion suggesting that unaffordable bail could violate due process rights. This led to a series of judicial reforms: in November 2016, Maryland's Standing Committee on Rules of Practice and Procedure recommended limiting the use of cash bail, and in February 2017, the Court of Appeals unanimously adopted the proposed rule. Barron subsequently introduced legislation to codify that change into state law during the 2017 session. Later, Barron successfully sponsored legislation that expanded best practice pretrial services statewide to reduce reliance on pretrial detention.

In 2017 and 2018, Barron raised alarms about Maryland's forensic mental-health crisis and how long mentally ill criminal defendants were held in jail before being transferred for court-ordered psychiatric treatment. The State Health Department was being held in contempt in proceedings across the state. He successfully sponsored legislation in 2018 that mandated health facility placement within a set number of days or the government would face penalties.

In 2019, he sponsored legislation allowing prosecutors to more easily overturn unjust or tainted convictions. The bill passed and was signed into law. That same year, he introduced a measure requiring county jails to offer addiction screening, and treatment, including access to methadone, Suboxone, and Vivitrol. The bill was signed into law by Governor Larry Hogan on May 13, 2019.

During the 2020 session, with support from prosecutors statewide, Barron proposed legislation to ease restrictions on the use of hearsay evidence in witness intimidation cases, and to classify witness intimidation as a crime of violence. The bill passed and was signed into law.

In 2021, Barron also introduced legislation to establish an independent inspector general for corrections to oversee the Maryland Department of Public Safety and Correctional Services. The bill did not pass but a subsequent version, introduced by Maryland State Senator Shelly Hettleman, creating an Office of Correctional Ombudsman, passed and was signed into law.

=== National politics ===
In April 2019, Barron and state Senator James Rosapepe launched "Biden for Maryland", becoming the first two lawmakers in the state to endorse Joe Biden's presidential campaign.

=== Transportation ===
Barron also supported regional transportation reforms and improvements. In May 2016, he and Delegate Marc Korman released a set of proposals to reform the Washington Metropolitan Area Transit Authority (WMATA), including calls for dedicated funding, board restructuring, and station-based revenue enhancements. In 2018, he introduced legislation that would increase Maryland's annual contribution to Metro by $125 million, contingent on similar commitments from Virginia and the District of Columbia. He also introduced legislation to establish an independent inspector general for WMATA, but it died in the Maryland Senate.

== Electoral history ==
Maryland House of Delegates District 24 election, 2014
Party	Candidate	Votes	%
Democratic	Carolyn J. B. Howard (incumbent)	25,869	34.1
Democratic	Michael L. Vaughn (incumbent)	23,772	31.3
Democratic	Erek Barron	23,450	30.9
Republican	Cy Okoro	2,737	3.6
Write-in		116	0.2

Maryland House of Delegates District 24 election, 2018
Party	Candidate	Votes	%
Democratic	Andrea Harrison	38,365	36.7
Democratic	Erek Barron (incumbent)	33,069	31.7
Democratic	Jazz Lewis (incumbent)	32,406	31.0
Write-in		586	0.6
