= Jazz Lewis =

American politician (born 1989)

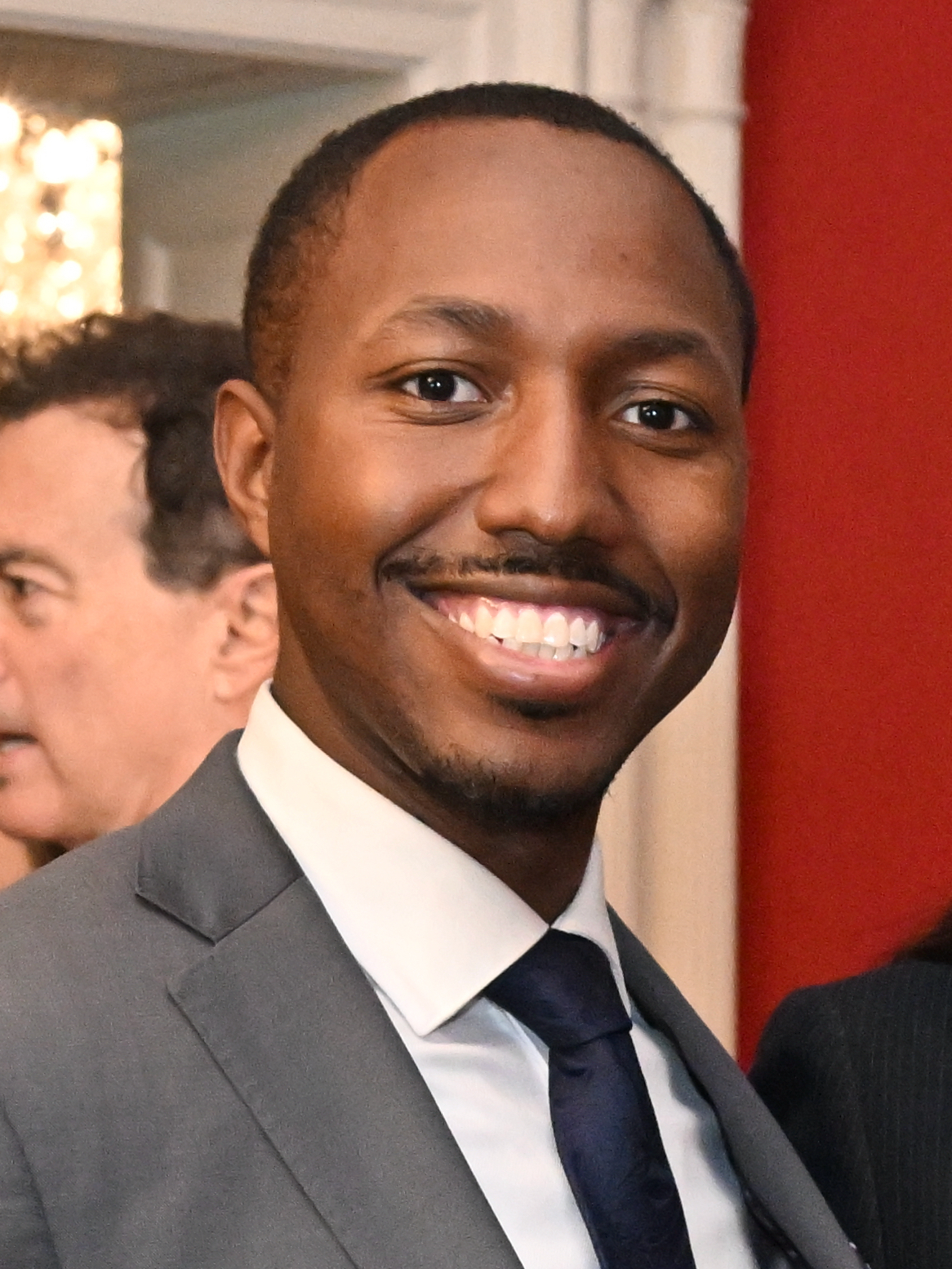
- Lewis in 2023

Member of the Maryland House of Delegates from the 24th district
- In office February 10, 2017 – January 5, 2026
- Appointed by: Larry Hogan
- Preceded by: Michael L. Vaughn
- Succeeded by: Derrick Coley

Personal details
- Born: February 26, 1989 (age 37) Silver Spring, Maryland, U.S.
- Party: Democratic
- Children: 2
- Education: University of Maryland, College Park (BA, MPP)

Jazz M. Lewis (born February 26, 1989) is an American politician who was a member of the Maryland House of Delegates representing the 24th district from 2017 to 2026. A member of the Democratic Party, he served as the House Majority Whip from 2023 to 2026.

== Early life and education ==
Lewis was born in Silver Spring, Maryland. He graduated from Charles Herbert Flowers High School and later attended the University of Maryland, College Park, where he earned a Bachelor of Arts degree in political science in 2011 and a Master of Public Policy degree in acquisition management and international development in 2014.

== Political career ==
Lewis first entered politics as a campus organizer, organizing students in a protest against a proposed tuition increase. After graduating, he joined the Service Employees International Union as a community organizer. In 2012, he worked as a regional field director for Ben Cardin's Senate campaign. After graduating, he became a community organizer for the Good Jobs Better Baltimore campaign. Lewis also worked for U.S. Representative Steny Hoyer, first as a field director before becoming an executive director in July 2015. During the 2016 presidential primaries, he worked as the Maryland political director for former U.S. Secretary of State Hillary Clinton.

On January 11, 2017, state delegate Michael L. Vaughn resigned from the Maryland House of Delegates, citing unspecified health issues. Lewis applied to fill the vacancy left by Vaughn's resignation, and was nominated by the Prince George's County Democratic Central Committee on January 24.

=== Maryland House of Delegates ===
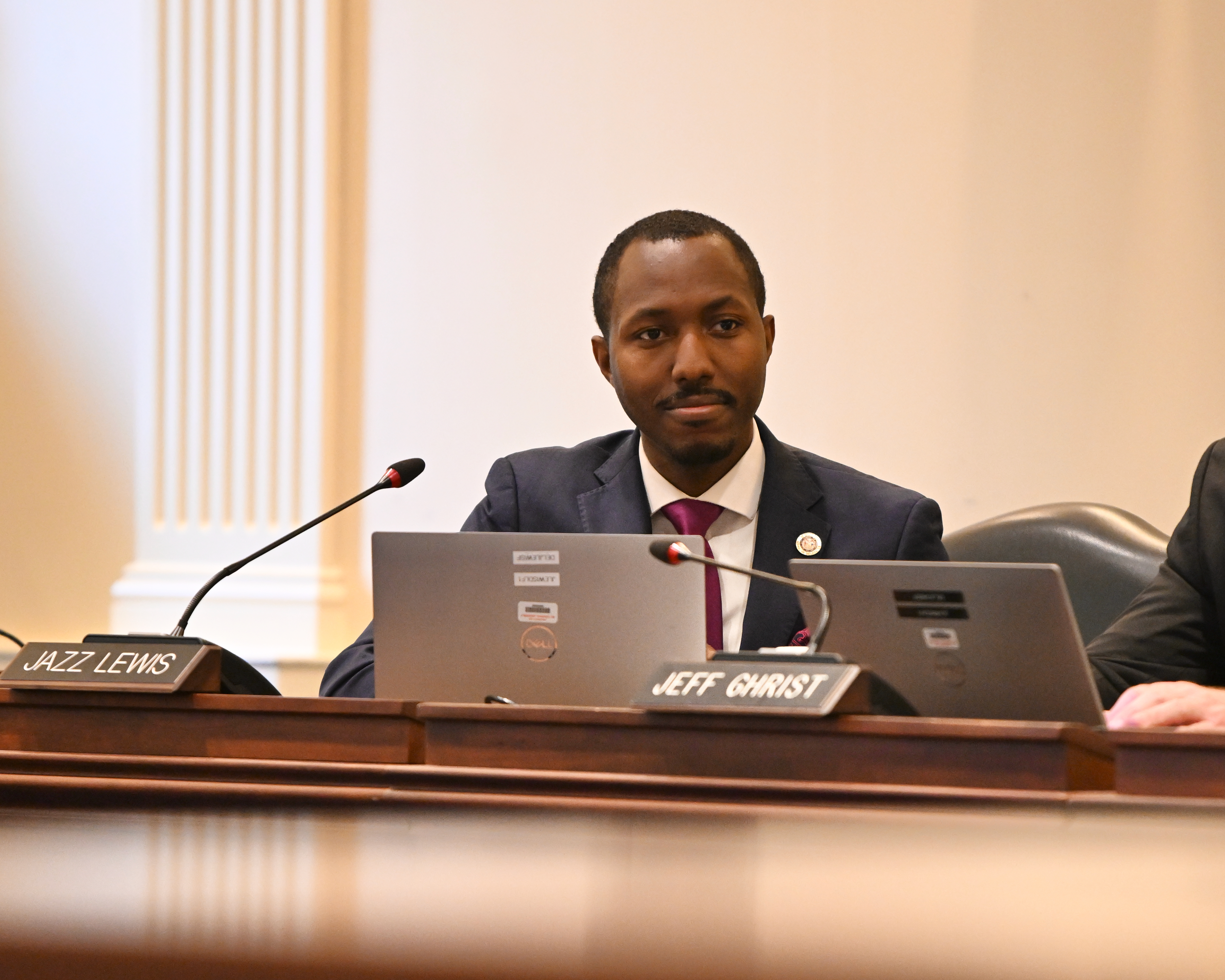
Lewis in the Appropriations Committee, 2023.

Lewis was appointed to the Maryland House of Delegates by Governor Larry Hogan on February 10, 2017, and was sworn in on the same day. He was subsequently elected for a full term in 2018, and re-elected in 2022.

Lewis was a member of the Judiciary Committee from 2017 to 2020, afterwards serving in the Appropriations Committee until his resignation in 2026. In September 2019, House Speaker Adrienne A. Jones named Lewis as the chair of the House Democratic Caucus. In January 2023, Jones named him as the House Majority Whip, succeeding then-delegate Talmadge Branch.

From 2019 until October 2021, Lewis worked as a senior policy advisor to House Majority Leader Steny Hoyer.

Lewis was an at-large delegate to the 2024 Democratic National Convention, pledged to Kamala Harris.

=== 2022 congressional candidacy ===
In October 2021, Lewis announced his candidacy for Maryland's 4th congressional district, seeking to succeed outgoing Representative Anthony Brown, who was a candidate for Attorney General. During the primary, he was endorsed by House Majority Leader Steny Hoyer and U.S. Representative Ritchie Torres. He withdrew his candidacy on April 14, 2022, saying that he would seek another term in the House of Delegates in lieu of a congressional bid.

== Post-legislative career ==
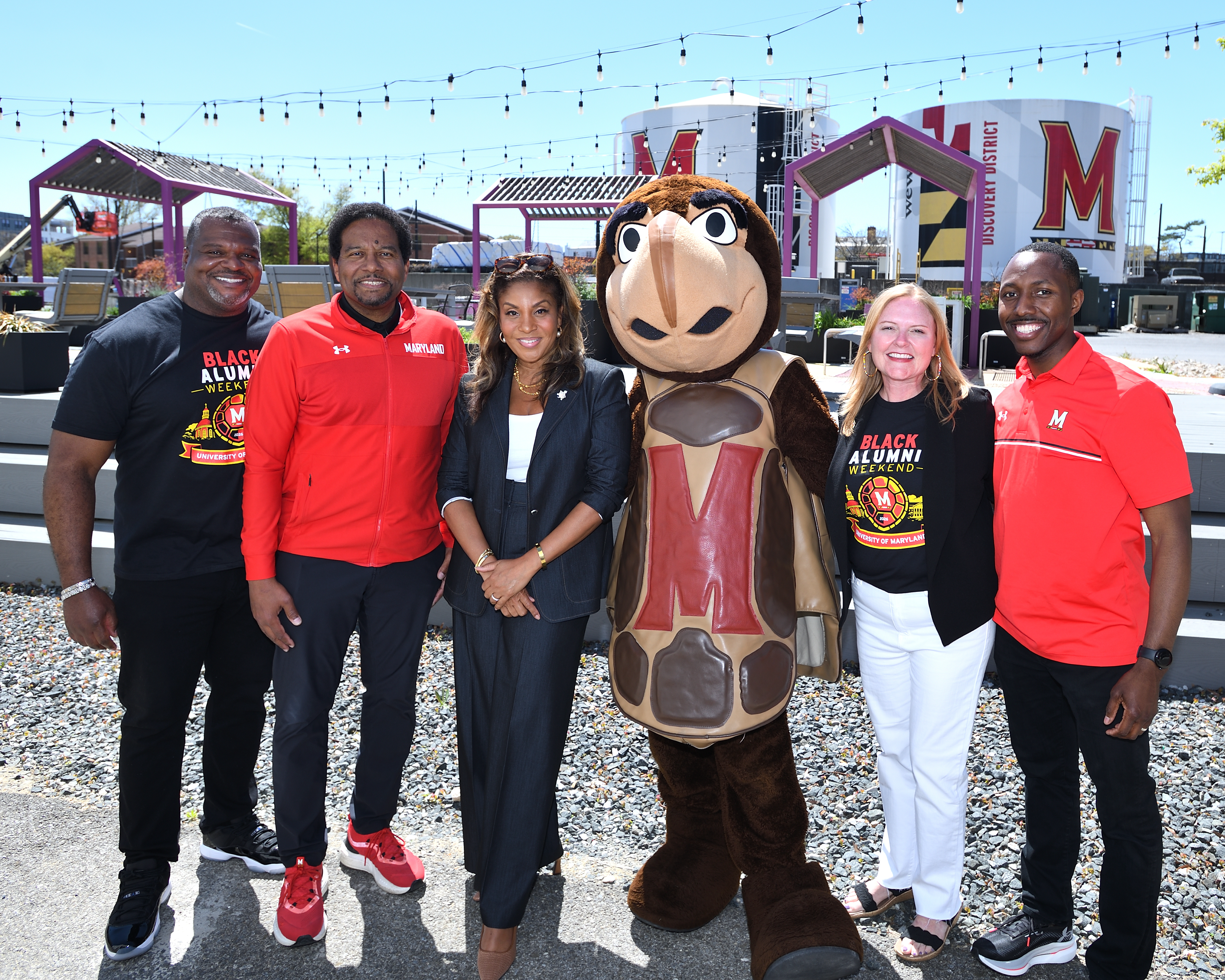
Lewis (far right) with UMD president Darryll Pines and Maryland first lady Dawn Moore, 2026

On December 16, 2025, Lewis announced that he would resign from the Maryland House of Delegates effective January 5, 2026, to become the director of state government for the University of Maryland, College Park.

== Political positions ==
Lewis has described himself as "unabashedly a progressive" who is also a "consensus-maker". During his 2022 congressional campaign, Lewis told Jewish Insider that he did not express a desire to align with The Squad, but hoped to befriend and work with its members.

=== Criminal justice and policing ===
During the 2018 legislative session, Lewis introduced a bill that would limit restrictive housing and its use for vulnerable members of the prison population, including pregnant women, older prisoners, and those with disabilities. He reintroduced the bill during the 2019 and 2020 legislative sessions.

In 2019, Lewis said he opposed a controversial bill that would allow Johns Hopkins University to employ its own private police force. After realizing the bill had the votes to pass, he introduced a series of amendments to hold the police force accountable. The bill passed with the amendments.

Also in 2019, Lewis introduced a bill that would require the Department of Legislative Services to prepare racial impact statements on bills creating or modifying misdemeanor and felony offenses. He later worked with legislative leaders Adrienne A. Jones and Bill Ferguson to initiate a pilot program requiring racial impact statements on criminal justice bills in 2021.

In June 2020, Lewis pledged to stop taking campaign contributions from the Fraternal Order of Police.

In July 2020, Lewis was appointed to represent the Maryland House of Delegates on the Law Enforcement Body Camera Task Force, a committee tasked with helping jurisdictions utilize police body cameras. During the 2023 legislative session, Lewis introduced a bill that would require the Maryland Department of General Services to negotiate affordable police body camera contracts for police departments with small budgets.

During the 2021 legislative session, Lewis introduced the Juvenile Restoration Act, a bill that would end life without parole sentences for juvenile offenders. The bill passed the Maryland House of Delegates and the Maryland Senate, but was vetoed by Governor Larry Hogan; the veto was overridden by the Maryland General Assembly during the 2022 legislative session.

During his 2022 House campaign, Lewis said he supported the George Floyd Justice in Policing Act, calling it one of his priorities. Also in 2022, he introduced the New Start Act, a bill that would offer small business loans and training to individuals who were formerly incarcerated and wanted to start a new business.

=== Foreign policy ===
Before the COVID-19 pandemic, Lewis traveled to Israel with the American Israel Education Foundation. He later encouraged progressive members of the U.S. House of Representatives who are critical of Israel to visit the country.

In November 2021, Lewis called Israel "one of our core friends" and said that he supported increasing U.S. foreign aid to Israel. He also said that he would have voted for a bill providing supplemental funding to Israel's Iron Dome missile-defense system, which passed by a 420-9 vote.

=== Health care ===
During the 2021 legislative session, Lewis introduced a bill to establish five Health Equity Resource Communities, each tasked with reducing disparities in the incidence and treatment of diseases, funded by a one percent increase in the state's alcohol tax.

During his 2022 congressional campaign, Lewis said he supported a single-payer health care system and expanding access to mental health services.

=== Marijuana ===
Lewis supported 2022 Maryland Question 4, a ballot referendum to legalize recreational marijuana in Maryland, voting to pass legislation creating the referendum during the 2022 legislative session and later encouraging his constituents to vote for legalization in October 2022. He had previously sponsored legislation to legalize cannabis during the 2021 legislative session, which failed to move out of committee.

=== National politics ===
In January 2021, Lewis condemned comments made by state delegate Dan Cox during the January 6 United States Capitol attack, replying to a post Cox made on Twitter with "Dan, you are better than this. Please don't cosign this lawlessness."

During the 2025 legislative session and amid federal mass layoffs, Lewis introduced the Protect Our Federal Workers Act, which would provide financial assistance to federal workers who permanently lose their jobs because of administrative budget cuts and allow the attorney general of Maryland to sue the federal government on the behalf of laid off federal workers. The bill passed and was signed into law by Governor Wes Moore.

=== Social issues ===
In 2019, Lewis voted to advance a bill that would lift a ban on candidates running in Prince George's County county-level political races from accepting developer contributions.

During the 2021 legislative session, Lewis introduced a bill that would remove all flavored tobacco products from the market.

== Personal life ==
Lewis is married and lives in Glenarden, Maryland. Together, he and his wife have a son and a daughter. He is a fan of the Washington Commanders.

== Electoral history ==
Maryland House of Delegates District 24 Democratic primary election, 2018
Party	Candidate	Votes	%
Democratic	Erek Barron (incumbent)	9,939	20.3
Democratic	Jazz Lewis (incumbent)	8,513	17.4
Democratic	Andrea Fletcher Harrison	7,111	14.5
Democratic	LaTasha R. Ward	5,685	11.6
Democratic	Maurice Simpson, Jr.	3,726	7.6
Democratic	Marnitta L. King	3,481	7.1
Democratic	Michelle R. Wright	3,297	6.7
Democratic	Sia Finoh	2,405	4.9
Democratic	Donjuan "DJ" Williams	1,789	3.7
Democratic	Joyce Starks	1,780	3.6
Democratic	Delaneo Miller	1,166	2.4

Maryland House of Delegates District 24 general election, 2018
Party	Candidate	Votes	%
Democratic	Andrea Fletcher Harrison	38,365	36.7
Democratic	Erek Barron (incumbent)	33,069	31.7
Democratic	Jazz Lewis (incumbent)	32,406	31.0
Write-in		586	0.6

Maryland House of Delegates District 24 general election, 2022
Party	Candidate	Votes	%
Democratic	Tiffany T. Alston	29,212	33.6
Democratic	Andrea Fletcher Harrison (incumbent)	28,880	33.2
Democratic	Jazz Lewis (incumbent)	28,396	32.7
Write-in		461	0.5
