= 1919 Maryland Attorney General election =

- November 6, 1919
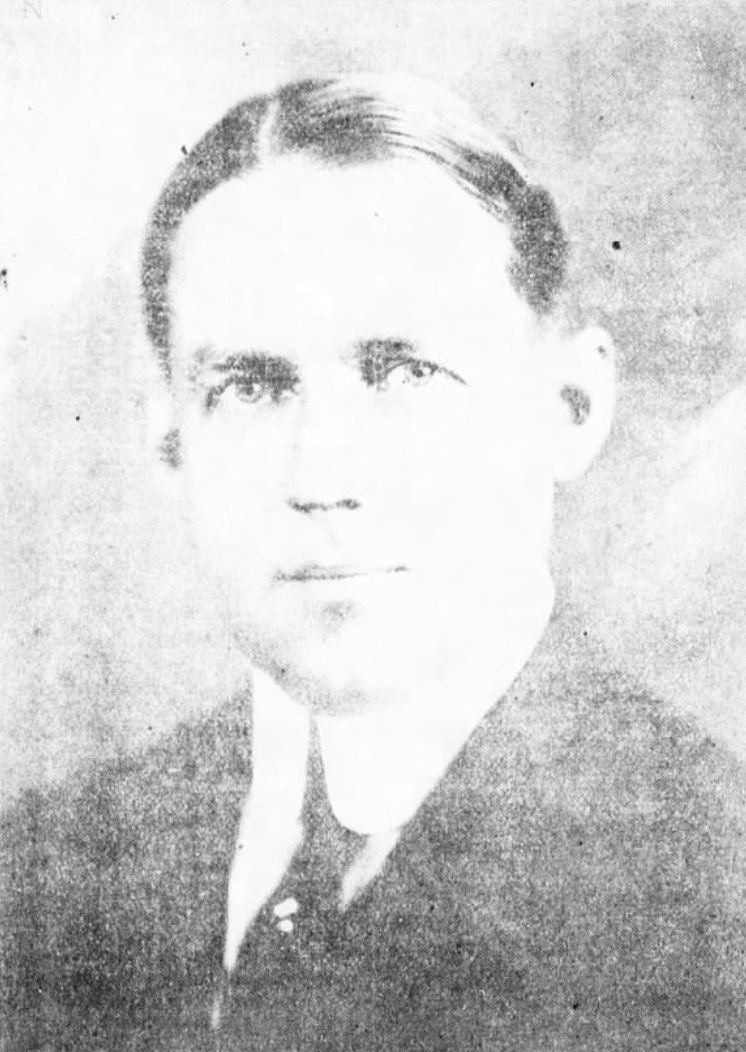

Nominee	Alexander Armstrong	Thomas J. Keating
Party	Republican	Democratic
Popular vote	106,894	106,288
Percentage	48.79%	48.51%
- County results Armstrong: 40–50% 50–60% 60–70% Keating: 40–50% 50–60% 60–70% 80–90%
Attorney General before election
Ogle Marbury (Acting)
Democratic
Elected Attorney General
Alexander Armstrong
Republican

The 1919 Maryland attorney general election was held on November 6, 1919, in order to elect the attorney general of Maryland. Republican nominee Alexander Armstrong defeated Democratic nominee Thomas J. Keating, Socialist nominee Frederick Haller and Labor nominee Frank N.H. Lang. As of 2022, this is the last time that a Republican was elected as Attorney General in Maryland.

== General election ==
On election day, November 6, 1919, Republican nominee Alexander Armstrong won the election by a margin of 606 votes against his foremost opponent Democratic nominee Thomas J. Keating, thereby gaining Republican control over the office of attorney general. Armstrong was sworn in as the 29th attorney general of Maryland on January 3, 1920.

=== Results ===
Maryland Attorney General election, 1919
Party	Candidate	Votes	%
Republican	Alexander Armstrong	106,894	48.79
Democratic	Thomas J. Keating	106,288	48.51
Socialist	Frederick Haller	3,101	1.41
Labor	Frank N.H. Lang	2,816	1.29
Total votes		219,099	100.00
Republican gain from Democratic			
