= Roy McGrath =

American politician (1969–2023)

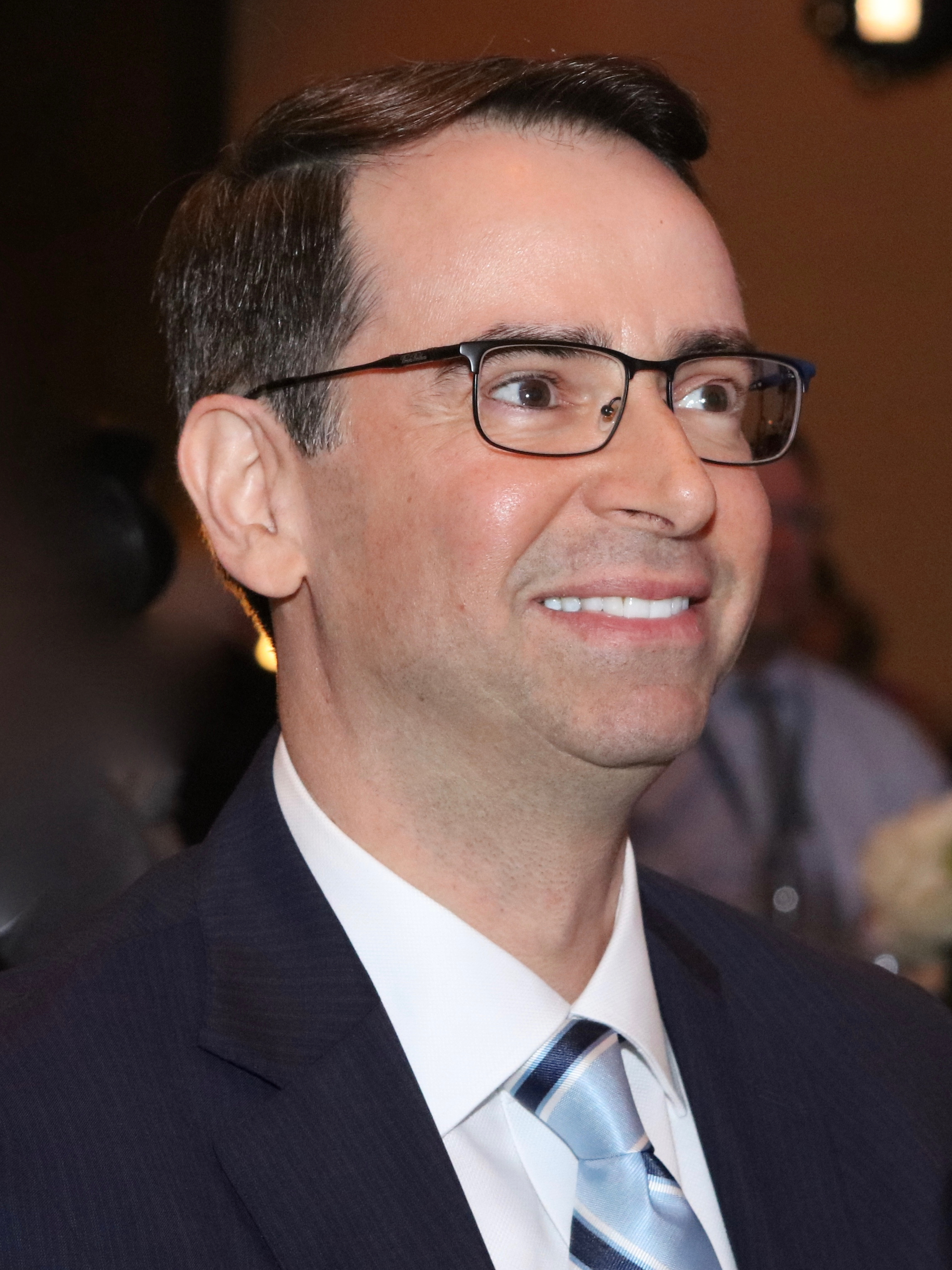
- McGrath in 2018

Chief of Staff to the Governor of Maryland
- In office June 1, 2020 – August 17, 2020
- Governor: Larry Hogan
- Preceded by: Matthew A. Clark
- Succeeded by: Keiffer Mitchell Jr. (acting)

Director of the Maryland Environmental Service
- In office December 21, 2016 – May 30, 2020
- Governor: Larry Hogan
- Preceded by: John O'Neill Jr. (acting)
- Succeeded by: Charles C. Glass (acting)

Personal details
- Born: August 9, 1969 Greece
- Died: April 3, 2023 (aged 53) Knoxville, Tennessee, U.S.
- Cause of death: Shooting during arrest
- Party: Republican
- Spouse(s): Yuliya Kryvenko (m. 1997; div. 2010) Laura Bruner (m. 2021)
- Education: University of Maryland, College Park (BA)

Roy C. McGrath (August 9, 1969 – April 3, 2023) was an American political operative who served as the director of the Maryland Environmental Service (MES) from 2016 to 2020, and as the chief of staff to Governor Larry Hogan from June to August 2020.

McGrath resigned as chief of staff after The Baltimore Sun reported that he had received a $233,647 severance payment after leaving the MES, which led federal and state prosecutors to open an investigation into McGrath's severance payments. In October 2021, he was indicted on charges including wire fraud, theft in programs receiving federal funds, and falsification of records. A three week long manhunt ensued after he did not appear for court, which led to a police chase in Tennessee in which McGrath was shot and killed by both himself and law enforcement at the same time.

== Background ==
McGrath was born on August 9, 1969, in Greece, to father Howard McGrath, an attorney, and his wife Polyxene. There is some ambiguity about McGrath's legal name. He is identified as "Roy Carlos McGrath" in his marriage license. In the federal and state indictments against him, he is simply referred to as "Roy C. McGrath". According to the FBI's wanted poster for McGrath, he may have used seven different names: Roy Carlos McGrath, Roy Charles McGrath, Roy Baisliadou, RC Baisliadou, Roy Mak-Grath, and RC McGrath.

McGrath grew up in Maryland, attending the Leonard Hall Junior Naval Academy and graduating from St. Mary's Ryken High School in 1987. He later attended the University of Maryland, College Park, where he earned a Bachelor of Arts degree in government and politics, and economics in 1993. After graduating, McGrath spent 18 years at the National Association of Chain Drug Stores, a trade group based in northern Virginia, where he worked in various capacities including vice president of business development.

McGrath first got involved with politics at 18, becoming a member of the Republican Party and later forming a Young Republicans club in Southern Maryland. In 1991, he served as a congressional intern and assistant to U.S. Representative Wayne Gilchrest. In 1992, as the chair of the Charles County Republican Central Committee, he chaired campaign activities for George H. W. Bush in the county and later served as an alternate delegate to the Republican National Convention, pledged to Bush, and worked on Larry Hogan's unsuccessful congressional campaign in Maryland's 5th congressional district. McGrath later worked on Hogan's gubernatorial campaign in 2014, serving as the director of the group "Lawyers for Hogan" and overseeing early voting and Election Day operations.

== Hogan administration ==
McGrath served as a member of Governor-elect Larry Hogan's transition team. He later joined the Hogan administration as a senior advisor and liaison to the Maryland Board of Public Works on January 21, 2015. He left this position on July 1, 2015, to become one of Hogan's deputy chiefs of staff.

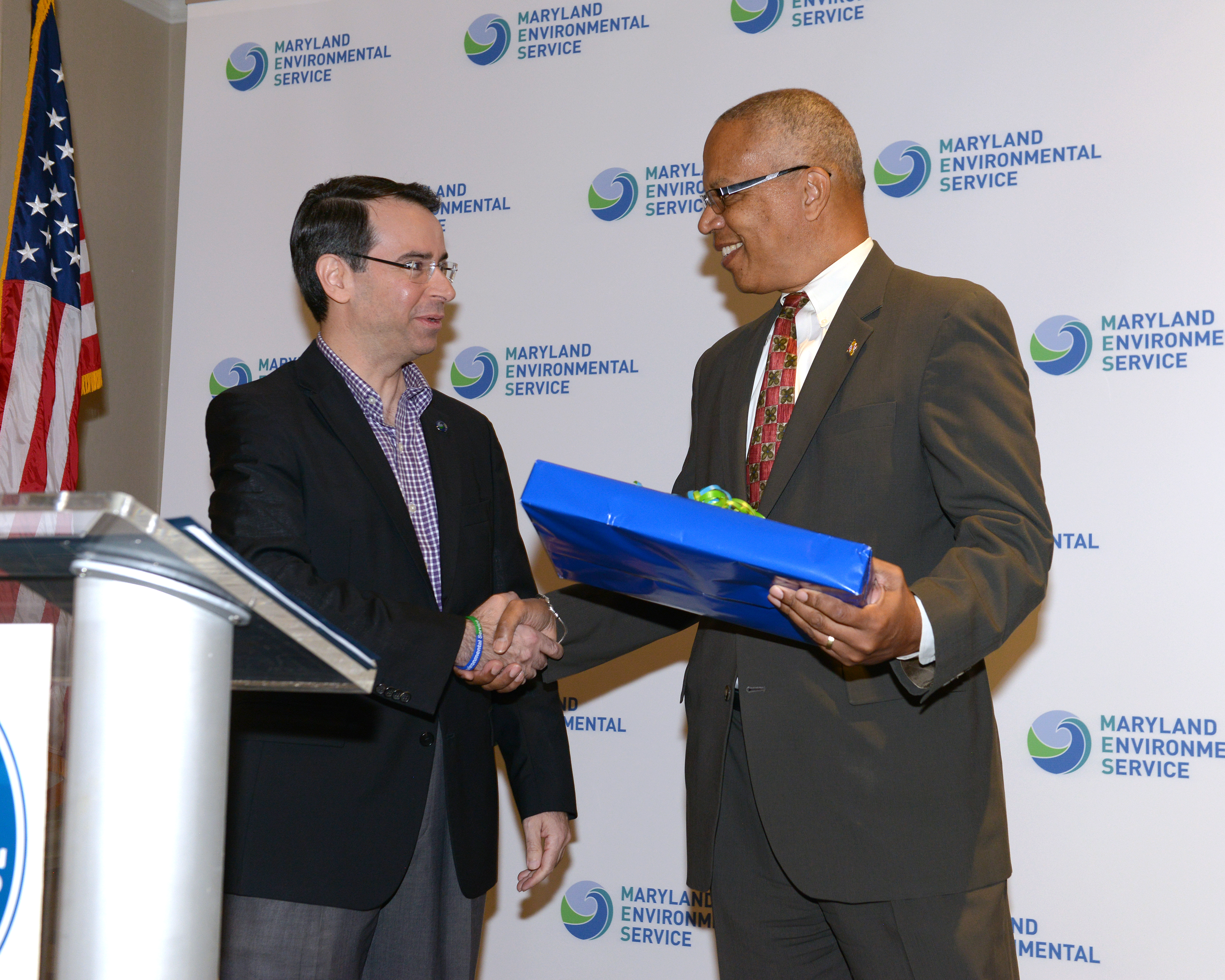
McGrath as Maryland Environmental Service director with Lieutenant Governor Boyd Rutherford, 2017

In December 2016, Governor Hogan appointed McGrath as the executive director of the Maryland Environmental Service, (MES) where he described himself as the CEO. While director of the MES, McGrath used state funds on personal expenses, including a $50,935 Chevrolet Suburban, $63,000 on remodeling and furniture, and $50,000 on trips to Naples, Miami, Israel, and Las Vegas. He also received employee incentive payments of $117,932 between September 2017 and September 2019. According to legislative investigators, McGrath also personally hired "loyal colleagues" to key positions in the agency who were persuaded to donate to Hogan's campaign, even though they did not live in Maryland.

During the COVID-19 pandemic, McGrath was named by Hogan to the state's Coronavirus Response Team. In this capacity, he spearheaded efforts with Operation Enduring Friendship, a confidential project that saw the state purchase 500,000 COVID-19 tests from South Korea for $10 million. According to prosecutors, McGrath began secretly recording meetings with other government officials on his iPhone around this time, which violated Maryland's wiretapping laws. It was McGrath's efforts related to the COVID-19 tests that led Governor Hogan to appoint McGrath as his new chief of staff following the resignation of Matthew A. Clark on May 26, 2020.

=== Severance payment scandal ===
In August 2020, the Baltimore Sun reported that McGrath received a $233,647 severance package that included a year's salary after voluntarily leaving the Maryland Environmental Service, which was approved by the agency's board of directors in a private online meeting on May 28. According to federal prosecutors and investigators, McGrath attempted to delete any mention of the compensation from public minutes following the vote. McGrath defended his severance package, writing in an op-ed for The Sun that he was entitled to a corporate-style golden parachute because MES operates "not much different from a private-sector entity." He resigned as chief of staff on August 17, 2020, four days after the story's publication. According to an affidavit obtained by the media, Hogan was first made aware of the payout on August 2, 2020, after MES board member Joseph F. Snee Jr. told Hogan's chief counsel, Michael Pedone, about the payout. After Hogan learned about the payout, McGrath was called to Hogan's office to discuss the matter the following day. Still, it is unclear as to whether Hogan took any further action before the Baltimore Sun article was released 10 days later. Following McGrath's resignation, Hogan ordered an audit of the Maryland Environmental Service.

Democratic Party leaders of the Maryland General Assembly quickly questioned the payout, with House Speaker Adrienne A. Jones and Senate President Bill Ferguson releasing a joint statement calling its disclosure "truly shocking" and asking the Joint Committee on Fair Practices and State Personnel Oversight to hold immediate hearings to look into why the payment was made; the co-chairs of the committee, state senator Clarence Lam and delegate Erek Barron, promised to investigate the payment. Before the committee's first meeting on August 25, McGrath sought Hogan's help, asking him via text message to intervene on his behalf. Hogan did not respond to his texts, instead immediately releasing the texts to the committee. During this first meeting, MES board members testified that they were misled by McGrath into believing that Hogan wanted them to approve the payment. In September 2020, former MES deputy Beth Wojton testified that McGrath routinely prevented her and other employees from seeing expenses related to the Environmental Business Leadership Conference, a series of MES events held each year. Later that month, the committee took the unusual step of authorizing a subpoena for McGrath, who testified before legislators in December 2020. During his testimony, McGrath repeatedly declined to answer questions, invoking the Fifth Amendment to the United States Constitution at least 130 times.

In September 2020, Democratic leaders of the Maryland General Assembly announced plans to reform the Maryland Environmental Service following McGrath's tenure. In December 2020, legislators introduced the Maryland Environmental Service Reform Act of 2021, which changed the management structure and oversight of the agency. The bill passed and was signed into law by Governor Hogan on April 13, 2021.

In May 2021, the Joint Committee on Fair Practices and State Personnel Oversight released a report on its investigation into McGrath, which suggested that McGrath flouted state personnel rules, received questionable reimbursements, and mischaracterized the details of his severance payment. The committee's final 82-page report was released in May 2022, which highlighted a pattern of questionable expenses and self-dealing under McGrath's tenure and called on the Maryland Environmental Service to take civil legal action against him.

== Criminal indictments ==
=== Federal charges ===
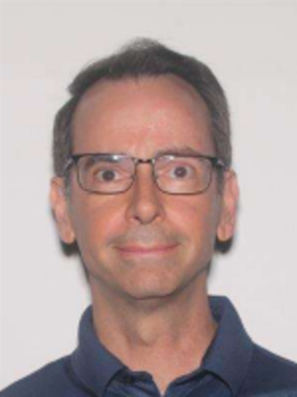
Federal Bureau of Investigation mugshot of McGrath, June 2021

In October 2020, Maryland Matters reported that both state and federal prosecutors were investigating the severance payments made to McGrath at the end of his tenure as MES director. On October 5, 2021, McGrath was indicted by a federal grand jury on charges for wire fraud, misconduct in office, and improper use of state funds. He lashed out against state prosecutors in a Facebook post later that week, saying that "politically-motivated bullies" were after him and that he was confident "the exculpatory facts will come to light and speak for themselves". Later that month, U.S. District Court Magistrate Thomas M. DiGirolamo approved pretrial release for McGrath, requiring him to surrender his passport and firearms. In November 2021, McGrath pleaded not guilty to criminal charges in federal court. If convicted, he could have faced up to 140 years in prison.

In November 2021, McGrath claimed that Governor Hogan had expressed support of his severance package, releasing screenshots of text message conversations between him and Hogan in August 2020, including one where Hogan wrote: "I know you did nothing wrong. I know it is unfair. I will stand with you". According to Michael Ricci, Hogan's Director of Communications, the governor sent the message before he learned more details about how McGrath obtained the severance package. Ricci also disputed other emails released by McGrath, calling them a "complete fabrication".

In June 2022, a superseding indictment was issued against McGrath, alleging that McGrath had forged a memorandum from Hogan approving the severance payment.

In August 2023, the United States Attorney for the District of Maryland sought to seize $119,000 in assets from an TD Ameritrade account belonging to McGrath, alleging that the account was entirely funded by his MES severance payment. In October 2024, U.S. District Court Judge Deborah Boardman ordered the money to be forfeited to the U.S. government.

=== State charges ===
On October 5, 2021, the same day McGrath was indicted on federal charges, he was indicted on state charges in Anne Arundel County Circuit Court for multiple counts of wiretapping and misconduct for allegedly recording conversations with the governor, cabinet secretaries and other officials without their consent. He was due to stand trial for the state charges in July 2023.

=== Manhunt and death ===
McGrath's federal trial was originally scheduled for October 24, 2022, but was delayed until March 13, 2023. However, he failed to appear in court for the beginning of his trial, prompting U.S. District Court Judge Deborah Boardman to issue a warrant for McGrath's arrest. The United States Marshals Service launched a manhunt for McGrath, whom they now considered a fugitive. According to a search warrant affidavit and body camera footage obtained by the media, McGrath did not make reservations to travel to Maryland ahead of his scheduled trial, despite having told his attorney and wife otherwise. During the manhunt, McGrath purchased a used white Cadillac Escalade, had a gun, and used multiple cellphones, which the Federal Bureau of Investigation used to track him as he went into hiding.

During the manhunt, McGrath self-published two books, Betrayed: The True Story of Roy McGrath and Betrayed: The True Story of Maryland Environmental Service, under the pseudonym "Ryan C. Cooper". "Cooper" declined to give out further biographical details about himself, including his birthday or middle name, only describing himself as a semi-retired man who moved from Hagerstown to Florida who sympathized with McGrath. In the books, McGrath defended his tenure at the Maryland Environmental Service and provided a tell-all against Governor Larry Hogan, who he claimed had acted out of "delusional, ego-driven aspirations for the White House". A third book was planned to release once more was known about McGrath's location, but never published. Federal officials were able to connect Cooper to McGrath through his own credit card and cellphone signals associated with Cooper's email address that showed McGrath traveling to a "variety of hotels in different states" on the East Coast during the manhunt.

On April 3, 2023, FBI agents sought to arrest McGrath at a Costco Wholesale store near the 10700 block of Kingston Pike in Farragut, Tennessee. He ignored police trying to arrest him, resulting in a police chase that ended when McGrath was boxed in near a local fast-food restaurant and auto parts store. McGrath ignored demands to put his hands out the driver's side window and told agents that he had a loaded gun, which he fired at his right temple. At the same time, FBI agents fired at McGrath, striking his left cheek. He was taken to the University of Tennessee Medical Center, where he died 30 minutes later. The Washington Post reported that in a document, law enforcement said they believed McGrath shot himself during the traffic stop, but that it was unclear whether the self-inflicted wound or shots from law enforcement killed him. The FBI concluded its investigation into McGrath's death on July 20, 2023, but were unable to determine whether McGrath or the FBI agent fired the fatal shot. Prosecutors declined to bring criminal charges against the FBI agent who opened fire, saying that he had acted in self defense.

== Personal life ==
McGrath married his first wife, Yuliya (anglicized to Julia, née Kryvenko), in 1997, and was divorced in 2010. In September 2021, less than two weeks before McGrath was federally indicted, he married Laura Bruner, who was his girlfriend at the time he served as MES director. They lived together in Edgewater, Maryland, before selling their home and moving to Naples, Florida, in December 2020.

McGrath and Bruner purchased a home in Naples for $610,000.
