= Sophy Burnham =

American author

- Born: December 12, 1936 (age 89); Baltimore, Maryland, U.S.
- Education: Smith College; University of Florence
- Occupations: Author; playwright; essayist; journalist
- Writing career
- Notable works: A Book of Angels; The Art Crowd; Penelope (play)
- Website: www.sophyburnham.com

Sophy Burnham (born December 12, 1936) is an American author, playwright, essayist and poet.

== Early life and education ==
=== Childhood ===
She was born Sophy Tayloe Doub to Sophy Tayloe Snyder and George Moffett Cochran Doub. Her father was Assistant Attorney General for the civil division of the Department of Justice during the second term of president Dwight D. Eisenhower. She attended Garrison Forest School in Owings Mills, Maryland from grammar school through grade 9, and Foxcroft School in Middleburg, Virginia for grades 10–12, where two of her aunts, her mother, her sister, and her cousin had attended as well. Foxcroft was at the time a girls' military and equestrian boarding school with strict discipline. For her senior commencement one of the Joint Chiefs of Staff reviewed the military drill. She made her debut to Baltimore society in 1954 at the Bachelors Cotillion.

=== Smith College and Florence, Italy ===
She attended Smith College, took her 1957 junior year abroad in Florence, Italy at the University of Florence, and graduated with a degree in Italian in 1958, cum laude, writing a thesis in Italian on the author Italo Svevo, and what is reality? In her 20s she began to experience the phenomena that led her later to write A Book of Angels and many other books.

== Career ==
=== Early work, writing and first publications, 1959–1989 ===
Upon graduation, and beginning in 1959, Burnham worked for the Smithsonian Institution in Washington, DC. By the time she left in 1964, she had been promoted to the rank of assistant curator for the Smithsonian Museum Service.

After moving to New York City with her husband and baby, she began freelancing for magazines. From 1964 on she wrote, including cover stories, for such publications as The New York Times Magazine, New York, Vogue, Reader's Digest of Japan and South America, Redbook, Ms., Town & Country, and Esquire. She joined the New York-based feminist group, Media Women, participated in the Ladies Home Journal sit-in of 1970, and many of her articles had a feminist twist. An influential cover story for New York magazine about the Manhattan art scene led to publication in 1973 of her first book, The Art Crowd, which became a New York Times bestseller and an alternate selection of the Book of the Month Club. From 1972 to 1974 she held her second job, as an associate editor at David McKay Publications in New York. Later in the 1970s having moved back to Washington D.C., she wrote The Landed Gentry: Passions and Personalities Inside America’s Propertied Class as well as two plays, Penelope and The Study, and two children's books, Buccaneer—illustrated by Miki Eagle—and The Dogwalker.

She has always been active in public arts, and was a founding member and past chairman of the Board of The Studio Theatre in Washington, DC. She served on the Octagon Committee of the American Institute of Architects Foundation, and was a founding member of the D.C. Humanities Council, the regranting arm of the National Endowment for the Humanities, where she served for two years as vice-chair.

=== Machu Picchu ===
After a spiritual revelation on Machu Picchu on March 28, 1979, documented in Chapter 4 of her 1997 book The Ecstatic Journey ("The Revelation on Machu Picchu"), she returned to the States, where her marriage ended. She wrote six more books in the 1980s but did not publish one for the next ten years, although she continued to publish many articles.

=== A Book of Angels ===
In 1990 Burnham's A Book of Angels: Reflections on Angels Past and Present and True Stories of How They Touch Our Lives, was published by Ballantine Books. It became an international bestseller, and it has been translated into 25 languages. In it she recounts stories of angels across time and cultures. She also tells her own story of encountering an angel during a ski accident in Val d'Isère, France. Although an experienced skier, conditions were not ideal and she found herself in peril. A man dressed all in black skied past her husband, came to her aid, and then mysteriously disappeared.

A Book of Angels was first of a cultural phenomenon of books, TV programs, films about angels, and of people who claimed to see angels. Literary critic Harold Bloom credited Burnham's book with starting the craze. Merchandise was abundant, including an explosion of angel candles, books, cards, posters, and spiritual paraphernalia.

Burnham spent the next decade giving interviews, talks, and workshops both in the U.S. and abroad. A Book of Angels is sometimes conflated with a play that came after it, Tony Kushner's 1993 Angels in America, about the AIDS crisis, as part of a phenomenon of angel awareness. The author herself attributed the interest in the spiritual to the approach of the new millennium. She has said that "Once people heard other people’s stories, they dared to believe and to tell about their own experiences. It was not that angels were intervening more frequently, but that these inexplicable moments were more easily recognized."

=== After Angels ===
Although Burnham's oeuvre is broad and encompasses many themes from art to horses, land, psychology, animals, architecture and the Classics, she remains best known for A Book of Angels. She continues to publish widely, including two more books about angels, Angel Letters in 1991, and in 1993, The President's Angel, a novel. She has published seven subsequent books, both novels and non-fiction, all concerning the spiritual or mystical, along with more plays and essays.

In the 1990s Burnham served as executive director of the Kennedy Center's Fund for New American Plays, working with Broadway producer Roger Stevens. They funded theaters to produce new plays and playwrights to write them.

=== Awards, grants, and honors ===
Award	Venue	Year
Best Magazine Feature	United States Horse Association	1969
Daughter of Mark Twain	Mark Twain Society	1974
Office of Advanced Drama Research Award ("Penelope")	University of Minnesota	1976
Radio play award ("The Witch's Tale")	National Public Radio (NPR)	1978
Third Prize, Episcopal Drama Award ("Penelope")	Episcopal Foundation for Drama	1979
Award of Excellence ("Machu Picchu")	Communication Arts Magazine, Realités	1980
Best Children's Radio Play ("Witch's Tale")	National Federation of Community Broadcasters	1980
Grant, The University of Alaska, Juneau	Juneau Arts & Humanities Council	1980
Grant	D. C. Arts & Humanities Council	1980-81
First Prize ("Penelope")	Women's Theater Award, Seattle, Washington	1981
Grant	The Helene Wurlitzer Foundation of Taos, New Mexico	1981, 1983, 1991
Award for Service to the Humanities	Washington, DC Community Humanities Council	1988
Who's Who of American Women	Marquis Who's Who	1991-1998
Virginia Duvall Mann Award ("Snowstorms")	North Carolina Festival of New Plays	1993
Who's Who in America	Marquis Who's Who	1994–1995, 1997-1999
Finalist	Turnip Theatre Company Festival (New York) (The Meaning of Life)	2002
Book of the Year Award (Love, Alba)	Foreword INDIEFAB	2015
Albert Nelson Marquis Lifetime Achievement Award	Marquis Who's Who	2018
Top 50 Books of the Year	Spirituality+Health (magazine)	
Member	The Cosmos Club	

== Personal life ==
On March 12, 1960, Sophy Tayloe Doub married journalist and author David Bright Burnham at Christ Episcopal Church in Georgetown, Washington, DC. They have two daughters, Sarah Tayloe Burnham and Molly Bright Burnham (herself the author of children's books); and four grandchildren. The couple separated in 1981 and divorced in 1983. In 2019 Burnham, then in her 80s, wrote an article for the "Modern Love" column of The New York Times about the romantic interest of a man 30 years her junior. She continues to write and as a physic and medium gives intuitive or psychic readings.

She lived for many years in the Georgetown neighborhood of Washington, DC, dividing her time between Washington and Taos, New Mexico. In 2020 she moved to Northampton, Massachusetts full-time. Among her good friends from the time when she lived in Taos is the bestselling writer and filmmaker Julia Cameron, author of The Artist's Way and many other books and films.

She is a member of the Cosmos Club of Washington, DC, where she was very active when in town. She plays on its chess team against clubs in Washington, London, and Paris. She is an avid horsewoman.

== Bibliography ==
=== Books ===
- The Wonder and Happiness of Being Old, 2025
- Falling: Love-Struck: The God Poems, Finishing Line Press, 2016.
- Love, Alba River Sanctuary Press, 2015. INDIEFAB book of the year award.
- The Art of Intuition Penguin/Tarcher, 2011.
- A Book of Angels (new edition), Ballantine Books, 2004. Translated into several languages.
- The Treasure of Montségur, (novel) Harper San Francisco, 2002. Translated into 4 languages. Paperback 2004.
- The Path of Prayer Viking-Compass, 2002. Literary Guild Selection. Translated into several languages.
- The Ecstatic Journey: Walking the Mystical Path in Everyday Life Ballantine Books, 1999.
- The Ecstatic Journey: The Transforming Power of Mystical Experience Ballantine Books, 1998.
- For Writers Only Ballantine Books, 1994.
- The President's Angel (novel). Ballantine Books, 1993.
- Revelations (novel). Ballantine Books, 1992. Literary Guild selection. Translated into several languages.
- Angel Letters, Ballantine Books, 1991. New York Times bestseller. Translated into 20 languages.
- A Book of Angels, Ballantine Books, 1990. New York Times bestseller. Translated into 22 languages. Book of the Month Club Alternate Selection.
- The Threat to Licensed Nuclear Facilities (editor), Mitre Corporation, 1975.
- The Landed Gentry, G. P. Putnam & Sons, 1978.
- The Art Crowd, David McKay Inc., 1973. New York Times bestseller. Saturday Review Book Club. Book of the Month Club Alternate Selection.

=== Books for children ===
- The Nightingale, radio play, National Public Radio (NPR), 1980; live performance at the Smithsonian Institution, and in other venues.
- The Dogwalker (a novel), Frederick Warne & Company, 1979.
- Buccaneer (a novel), Frederick Warne & Company, 1977.

=== Plays ===
- Aeschylus’ Prometheus Bound (adaptation) and Prometheus Released, a modern version of its lost conclusion. Commissioned by The Studio Theatre, March–April 2002.
- The Meaning of Life, a play commissioned by Arena Stage. Finalist, Turnip Theatre Company Festival, New York, NY, 2002.
- The Study, a two-act drama, 1979. Sophy Burnham revised the play as Snowstorms in 1985 and 1993.
- Penelope, 1976. A three-act classical drama of Homer's Odyssey, told from the point of view of Penelope. Most recently produced in 2005.

=== Plays for children ===
- The Witch's Tale, NPR radio play, 1978.
- Beauty and the Beast, NPR radio play, 1979.

=== Films ===
- The Music of Shakespeare's England, WETA-TV.
- The Smithsonian's Whale. This was the USIA entry in the Venice Film Festival, 1964.
- The Leaf Thieves, entered in the American Film Festival, 1964.
