= J. Lee Rankin =

American lawyer (1907–1996)

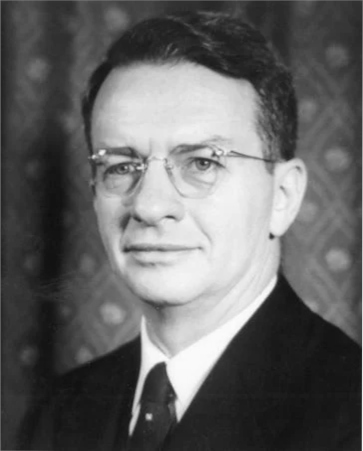
- Rankin, c. 1950

31st Solicitor General of the United States
- In office August 4, 1956 – January 23, 1961
- President: Dwight D. Eisenhower
- Preceded by: Simon Sobeloff
- Succeeded by: Archibald Cox

Personal details
- Born: James Lee Rankin; July 8, 1907; Hartington, Nebraska, US
- Died: June 26, 1996 (aged 88); Santa Cruz, California, US
- Political party: Republican
- Spouse: Gertrude Rankin (m. 1931)
- Children: 3

James Lee Rankin (July 8, 1907 – June 26, 1996) was the 31st United States Solicitor General.

== Early life ==
Rankin was born in Hartington, Nebraska, the son of Herman P. and Lois Gable Rankin. He attended public schools and earned his undergraduate and law degree from the University of Nebraska College of Law. In 1930 Rankin was admitted to the Nebraska bar and began practicing law in Lincoln. In 1935, he became a partner at his firm, where he worked for more than 20 years.

== Career ==
Rankin served as United States Solicitor General from 1956 to 1961. In 1952, Rankin managed Dwight Eisenhower's president campaign in Nebraska and in 1953, Eisenhower selected Rankin to serve as United States Assistant Attorney General.

In 1953, Rankin was appointed assistant attorney general in charge of the Office of Legal Counsel. In this capacity, Rankin may best be remembered for arguing in favor of the black plaintiffs in Brown v. Board of Education (1954), advocating that the doctrine of separate-but-equal facilities for blacks and whites was unconstitutional. After the Supreme Court's Brown ruling, Rankin argued before the court that the effort to desegregate schools should take place gradually in order to avoid violence. Accordingly, he suggested the plan by which local school districts submitted desegregation plans to federal judges in their states.

Rankin argued many other important cases before the Supreme Court. He was instrumental in resolving conflicting claims among Western states to the Colorado River and in establishing a balance of federal and state jurisdictions in offshore oil drilling.

On August 14, 1956, Rankin was appointed U.S. Solicitor General. In response to lawsuits in many states arising out of legislative reapportionment fights, he developed the Justice Department's position that led to the principle of one man, one vote. After serving as solicitor general from August 1956 to January 1961, Rankin represented the American Civil Liberties Union in advancing the landmark case Gideon v. Wainwright, which solidified the right of an indigent person accused of a crime to have legal counsel at public expense.

Following President John F. Kennedy's assassination and the appointment of Chief Justice Earl Warren to serve as the chairman of the President's Commission on the Assassination of President Kennedy, known unofficially as the Warren Commission, Rankin was selected by Warren to serve as general counsel in the inquiry that concluded that Lee Harvey Oswald had acted alone in killing Kennedy. According to author Edward Epstein, Rankin was primarily an administrator and lent a guiding hand in shaping the investigation. The 14-man legal staff was divided into seven two-man teams, each of which handled a separate area of the investigation and contributed a chapter to the commission's final report. The staff lawyer whom Epstein credited with redrafting and editing the commission's voluminous report was Norman Redlich.

After his work with the Warren Commission, Rankin practiced law in New York City until the 1970s, working seven years as the New York City Corporation Counsel (1966-1972).

== Later life ==
Upon retirement, Rankin and his wife of 63 years Gertrude moved to Weston, Connecticut, where they had a summer home. In 1993, they relocated to Los Gatos, California.

Rankin died on June 26, 1996, in Santa Cruz, California.

Legal offices
Preceded by Simon Sobeloff	Solicitor General; 1956–1961	Succeeded by Archibald Cox
