= Bernard J. Flynn =

United States Attorney for the District of Maryland
- In office 1934–1953
- President: Franklin D. Roosevelt; Harry S. Truman
- Preceded by: Simon Sobeloff
- Succeeded by: George Cochran Doub

Personal details
- Born: February 10, 1888 Baltimore, Maryland
- Died: September 15, 1971 Baltimore, Maryland
- Party: Democratic

Bernard J. Flynn (February 10, 1888 – September 15, 1971) was an American attorney who served as the United States Attorney for the District of Maryland from 1934 to 1953.
