= Elliott Northcott =

American judge (1869–1946)

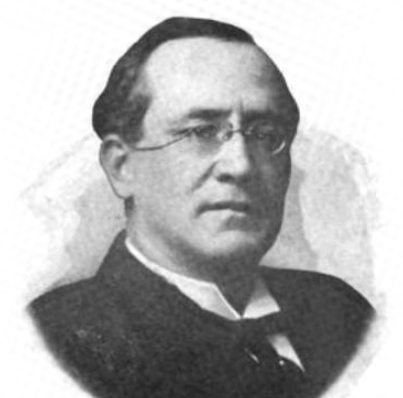

Senior Judge of the United States Court of Appeals for the Fourth Circuit
- In office October 15, 1939 – January 3, 1946

Judge of the United States Court of Appeals for the Fourth Circuit
- In office April 6, 1927 – October 15, 1939
- Appointed by: Calvin Coolidge
- Preceded by: John Carter Rose
- Succeeded by: Armistead Mason Dobie

Personal details
- Born: Elliott Northcott; April 26, 1869 Clarksburg, West Virginia
- Died: January 3, 1946 (aged 76) Arcadia, Florida
- Spouse: Lola Beardsley (m. 1893)
- Education: University of Michigan Law School read law

Elliott Northcott (April 26, 1869 – January 3, 1946) was a United States circuit judge of the United States Court of Appeals for the Fourth Circuit.

== Early and family life ==
Born in Clarksburg, West Virginia, Northcott attended the University of Michigan Law School, but read law to enter the bar in 1891. Northcott married Lola Beardsley in 1893.

== Lawyer and diplomat ==
Northcott was admitted to the West Virginia bar and began a private legal practice in 1891. He became the city attorney of Huntington, West Virginia, serving from 1897 to 1898, and then became an Assistant United States Attorney of the Southern District of West Virginia from 1898 to 1905, and won promotion to become the United States Attorney for that district from 1905 to 1909.

Northcott then became a diplomat in the U.S. State department. The United States Envoy Extraordinary and Minister Plenipotentiary to Colombia from 1909 to 1911, he held a similar position in Nicaragua in 1911, and then transferred to a similar position with respect to Venezuela (1911 to 1913). He returned to private practice in West Virginia from 1915 to 1922, and again served as the United States Attorney for the Southern District of West Virginia from 1922 to 1927.

== Federal judge ==
Northcott received a recess appointment from President Calvin Coolidge on April 6, 1927, to a seat on the United States Court of Appeals for the Fourth Circuit vacated by Judge John Carter Rose. He was nominated to the same position by President Coolidge on December 6, 1927. He was confirmed by the United States Senate on December 15, 1927, and received his commission the same day. He assumed senior status on October 15, 1939.

=== Notable cases ===
Northcott authored the 1930 case Bliley v. West in which the Fourth Circuit upheld a 1929 decision of Judge Groner of the Eastern District of Virginia, West v. Bliley, that ruled Virginia's white primary unconstitutional. This predated by fourteen years the Supreme Court ruling against white primaries in general in Smith v. Allwright.

== Death and legacy ==
Judge Northcott died on January 3, 1946, in Arcadia, Florida.

== Sources ==
Legal offices
Preceded by John Carter Rose	Judge of the United States Court of Appeals for the Fourth Circuit; 1927–1939	Succeeded by Armistead Mason Dobie
