= Juvenile Restoration Act =

Maryland, US law

Maryland State Legislature
- Full name: Juveniles Convicted as Adults - Sentencing - Limitations and Reduction (Juvenile Restoration Act)
- Introduced: January 20, 2021
- House voted: March 30, 2021 (88-48)
- Senate voted: April 2, 2021 (32-15)
- Sponsor(s): Jazz Lewis; Christopher R. West
- Governor: Larry Hogan
- Code: Criminal Procedure
- Section: § 6-235 and § 8-110
- Bill: SB 0494
- Associated bills: HB0409
- Website: Legislation

Status: Current legislation

The Juvenile Restoration Act (JRA) is a law in Maryland allowing minors who were sentenced as adults to ask a judge to consider a reducing their sentence after they have served 20 years in prison. The law also prevents juveniles from being sentenced to life without the possibility of parole, making Maryland the 25th U.S. state to ban life sentences for juveniles.

== Legislative history ==
The JRA was sponsored by Delegate Jazz Lewis and Senator Christopher R. West and introduced on January 20, 2021. The Maryland House of Delegates voted on March 30, 2021, approving the bill with a vote of 88–48. The Maryland Senate voted to approve the bill, 32–15, on April 2, 2021. Governor Larry Hogan vetoed the bill on April 8, 2021. On April 10, 2021, the Maryland General Assembly overrode Governor Hogan's veto, passing the bill.

== Impact ==
Under the JRA, 415 people became eligible for sentencing review. Shortly after the passage of the law, the Maryland Office of the Public Defender created the Decarceration Initiative, which coordinated representation for indigent clients eligible for sentencing review. The law went into effect on October 1, 2021. During the law's first year in effect, thirty-six motions for sentence reduction were decided, resulting in a shorter sentence in twenty-seven cases. In twenty-three of these cases individuals were granted immediate release.

== See also ==
- Life imprisonment of minors in the United States
- Trial as an adult in the United States
- Youth incarceration in the United States
