= George Cochran Doub =

American attorney (1902-1981)

12th United States Assistant Attorney General for the Civil Division
- In office April 26, 1956 – January 20, 1961
- President: Dwight D. Eisenhower
- Preceded by: Warren E. Burger
- Succeeded by: William Horsley Orrick Jr.

United States Attorney for the District of Maryland
- In office August 12, 1953 – April 26, 1956
- President: Dwight D. Eisenhower
- Preceded by: Bernard J. Flynn
- Succeeded by: Walter Evan Black Jr.

Personal details
- Born: July 25, 1902 Cumberland, Maryland
- Died: October 30, 1981 (aged 79) Owings Mills, Maryland
- Party: Republican

George Cochran Doub (July 25, 1902 – October 30, 1981) was Attorney General for the District of Maryland from 1953 to 1956, and Assistant Attorney General for the Civil Division of the Department of Justice from 1956 to 1961. This division supervises the thousands of civil cases in which the Federal Government or officials are defendants or plaintiffs.

It was Mr. Doub who scuttled Postmaster General Arthur E. Summerfield's refusal to allow through the mails on grounds of obscenity postcard reproductions of Francisco Goya's The Naked Maya. His opposition to appealing the Federal Court decision that upset the Post Office's obscenity ban on Lady Chatterley's Lover was overruled by Attorney General William O. Rogers.

Doub worked on revising government security programs that limited the strictest security tests only to those government employees in sensitive positions. A Washington Post editorial said it "was the beginning of rationality and the key to making the program genuinely protective instead of senselessly punitive."

Among his most notable achievements was settlement of confiscated property claims by the 126,000 Japanese-Americans (Nisei) forced into concentration camps during World War II and the return of citizenship to 5000 individuals who had renounced it under what the courts later termed "circumstantial duress."

Ina 1958 speech, Mr. Doub said that government actions against Japanese-Americans during the war "constituted a tragic failure of principle by the executive power... and the judicial power in sustaining it. The voices which opposed the measures were pathetically few." He won praise from many legal figures who felt the evacuation program was a dark blot in American History. At the ceremony restoring citizenship to a group of Nisei, Mr. Doub asked them to "have the charity to forgive their Government."

While at the Justice Department, his name was put in as a nomination to the Supreme Court by the Advisory Committee on Federal Rules of Civil Procedure.

On leaving the Justice Department, he became counsel to the law firm of Weinberg and Green until his retirement in 1973. As attorney for former Rep. Thomas F. Johnson (D-MD) during the congressman's fight against federal corruption charges, he argued before the Supreme Court that a speech on the floor of Congress is protected in the Constitution.

During World War II he served as lieutenant commander in the Navy and flew as a volunteer crew member both on bombing attacks and on a flight to drop supplies to prisoner of war camps in Japan. He served aboard three carriers that were torpedoed or subjected to kamikaze attacks.

He died of atherosclerosis on October 30, 1981, in Owings Mills, Maryland at the age 79.

He was the father of Anne Marzin, George Doub, and author Sophy Burnham.
