= Charles Markell =

American judge

Chief Judge of the Maryland Court of Appeals
- In office August 1952 – December 1952
- Preceded by: Ogle Marbury
- Succeeded by: Simon Sobeloff

Personal details
- Born: December 16, 1882; Baltimore, Maryland, U.S.
- Died: February 24, 1955 (aged 72)

Charles Markell (December 16, 1882 – February 24, 1955) was an American jurist who served as Chief Judge of the Supreme Court of the U.S. state of Maryland, the Court of Appeals.

Markell was born in Baltimore, Maryland to John and Elizabeth Charlton Harris Markell. He received his early education in the public schools of Hagerstown and Baltimore, and graduated in 1902 with an A.B. degree from Johns Hopkins University. He received his LL.B. degree in 1904 from the University of Maryland School of Law in Baltimore.

From 1904 to 1944, Markell worked in the law office of Gans and Haman, which later became the law office of Cook and Markell. From 1941 to 1942, he served as President of the Maryland Bar Association. He served as associate judge of the Maryland Court of Appeals from 1944 to 1952, and briefly as Chief Judge of the Court from August to December 16, 1952. He returned to his law practice, where he remained until his death.

Markell married to Jeanette Jones (died 1923) in 1909, which whom he had three children.

Legal offices
Preceded by Ogle Marbury	Chief Judge of the Maryland Court of Appeals; August 1952–December 1952	Succeeded by Simon Sobeloff
