= Morris Ames Soper =

American judge (1873–1963)

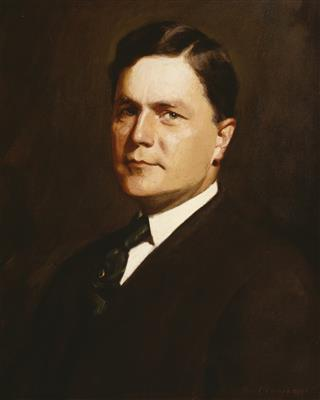

Senior Judge of the United States Court of Appeals for the Fourth Circuit
- In office June 2, 1955 – March 11, 1963

Judge of the United States Court of Appeals for the Fourth Circuit
- In office May 6, 1931 – June 2, 1955
- Appointed by: Herbert Hoover
- Preceded by: Edmund Waddill Jr.
- Succeeded by: Simon Sobeloff

Judge of the United States District Court for the District of Maryland
- In office February 24, 1923 – May 9, 1931
- Appointed by: Warren G. Harding
- Preceded by: John Carter Rose
- Succeeded by: William Calvin Chesnut

President of the Baltimore Board of Police Commissioners
- In office April 4, 1912 – December 31, 1913
- Preceded by: John B. A. Wheltle
- Succeeded by: James McEvoy

Personal details
- Born: Morris Ames Soper; January 23, 1873 Baltimore, Maryland, US
- Died: March 11, 1963 (aged 90) Baltimore, Maryland, US
- Education: Johns Hopkins University (AB); University of Maryland School of Law (LLB)

Morris Ames Soper (January 23, 1873 – March 11, 1963) was a United States circuit judge of the United States Court of Appeals for the Fourth Circuit and previously was a United States district judge of the United States District Court for the District of Maryland.

== Education and career ==
Born in Baltimore, Maryland, Soper received an Artium Baccalaureus degree from Johns Hopkins University in 1893 and a Bachelor of Laws from the University of Maryland School of Law in 1895. He was an assistant state's attorney of Baltimore City from 1897 to 1899. He was an Assistant United States Attorney of the District of Maryland from 1900 to 1909. He was in private practice in Maryland from 1909 to 1914. He was President of the Board of Police Commissioners for Baltimore City from 1912 to 1913. He was Chief Judge of the Supreme Bench of Baltimore from 1914 to 1921. He was in private practice in Maryland from 1921 to 1923.

== Federal judicial service ==
Soper was nominated by President Warren G. Harding on February 10, 1923, to a seat on the United States District Court for the District of Maryland vacated by Judge John C. Rose. He was confirmed by the United States Senate on February 24, 1923, and received his commission the same day. His service terminated on May 9, 1931, due to his elevation to the Fourth Circuit.

Soper received a recess appointment from President Herbert Hoover on May 6, 1931, to a seat on the United States Court of Appeals for the Fourth Circuit vacated by Judge Edmund Waddill Jr. He was nominated to the same position by President Hoover on December 15, 1931. He was confirmed by the Senate on January 12, 1932, and received his commission on January 19, 1932. He assumed senior status on June 2, 1955. His service terminated on March 11, 1963, due to his death.

=== Notable cases ===
Beginning in 1955, Soper sat on a 3-judge federal panel which handled various desegregation cases in Virginia. With Chief Judge Charles Sterling Hutcheson of the Eastern District of Virginia and new Eastern District judge Walter E. Hoffman, Soper heard many desegregation cases arising from the Byrd Organization's declared policy of Massive Resistance to racial desegregation. The panel heard the cases ultimately decided by the United States Supreme Court in Harrison v. NAACP and NAACP v. Button, which concerned attempts to harass NAACP attorneys (including future Supreme Court justice Thurgood Marshall, 4th Circuit judge Spottswood Robinson and federal district judge Robert L. Carter) who were bringing the desegregation case.

Soper served on the board of trustees of Morgan State University for more than three decades (as its chairman for half that time), and helped bring it within the Maryland state university system. His last judicial act (as a senior judge) was an order allowing an African American, Henry Gantt, to attend the school of architecture at Clemson University.

== Death and papers ==
Soper died age 90 of complications after minor surgery at Baltimore's Union Memorial Hospital. Attorney General Robert F. Kennedy and Maryland Governor Theodore McKeldin were among the pall bearers at his funeral.

Soper's papers were donated to the Maryland Historical Society Library with a 25-year restriction on access, which with a snafu meant archiving did not begin for decades.

== Sources ==
- "Soper, Morris Ames - Federal Judicial Center". www.fjc.gov.

Legal offices
Preceded by John Carter Rose	Judge of the United States District Court for the District of Maryland; 1923–1931	Succeeded by William Calvin Chesnut
Preceded by Edmund Waddill Jr.	Judge of the United States Court of Appeals for the Fourth Circuit; 1931–1955	Succeeded by Simon Sobeloff
