= Simon Sobeloff =

American judge (1894–1973)

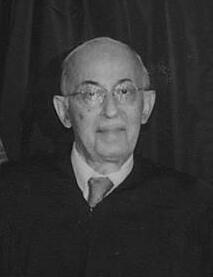
- Sobeloff in 1973

Senior Judge of the United States Court of Appeals for the Fourth Circuit
- In office December 31, 1970 – July 11, 1973

Chief Judge of the United States Court of Appeals for the Fourth Circuit
- In office 1958–1964
- Preceded by: John J. Parker
- Succeeded by: Clement Haynsworth

Judge of the United States Court of Appeals for the Fourth Circuit
- In office July 18, 1956 – December 31, 1970
- Appointed by: Dwight D. Eisenhower
- Preceded by: Morris Ames Soper
- Succeeded by: Donald S. Russell

30th Solicitor General of the United States
- In office February 10, 1954 – July 19, 1956
- President: Dwight D. Eisenhower
- Preceded by: Walter J. Cummings Jr.
- Succeeded by: J. Lee Rankin

Chief Judge of the Maryland Court of Appeals
- In office 1952–1954
- Appointed by: Theodore McKeldin
- Preceded by: Charles Markell
- Succeeded by: Frederick Brune

United States Attorney for the District of Maryland
- In office 1931–1934
- Appointed by: Herbert Hoover
- Preceded by: Amos W. W. Woodcock
- Succeeded by: Bernard J. Flynn

Personal details
- Born: Simon Ernest Sobeloff; December 3, 1894 Baltimore, Maryland, U.S.
- Died: July 11, 1973 (aged 78) Baltimore, Maryland, U.S.
- Resting place: Hebrew Friendship Cemetery; Baltimore, Maryland
- Party: Republican
- Education: University of Maryland School of Law (LLB)

Simon Ernest Sobeloff (December 3, 1894 – July 11, 1973) was an American attorney and jurist, who served as Solicitor General of the United States, as Chief Judge of the Court of Appeals of Maryland, and as a United States circuit judge of the United States Court of Appeals for the Fourth Circuit.

== Education and career ==
Sobeloff was born in Baltimore, Maryland, the son of Jacob and Mary Hilda (Kaplan) Sobeloff, who were Russian Jewish immigrants. Sobeloff attended public schools including Baltimore City College and the University of Maryland School of Law, where he received his Bachelor of Laws in 1915. He served as a Page in the United States House of Representatives in 1910. He was admitted to the Maryland Bar in 1914, was a law clerk in Baltimore the same year, and subsequently went into private practice. From 1919 through 1924 he served as the assistant city solicitor for Baltimore and was appointed the deputy city solicitor for Baltimore from 1927 to 1931. In 1931 he became the United States Attorney for the District of Maryland, where he served until 1934. Subsequently, he was selected to be the Baltimore City Solicitor and the special counsel to Baltimore City Housing Commission. He then returned to private practice from 1947 to 1952. Sobeloff served as Chairman of the Commission on the Administrative Organization of the State of Maryland from 1951 to 1952. In 1952, he was appointed to the position of Chief Judge of the Maryland Court of Appeals, where he served until 1954.

== Solicitor General ==
From 1954 through 1956, Sobeloff served as United States Solicitor General in the Administration of President Dwight D. Eisenhower. Sobeloff presented the government's arguments on the implementation of the Supreme Court's decision in Brown v. Board of Education, to outlaw segregation in public schools.

== Federal judicial service ==
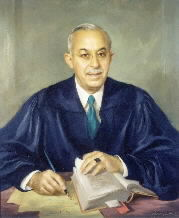
Soveloff's court portrait.

Sobeloff was nominated by President Dwight D. Eisenhower on January 12, 1956, to a seat on the United States Court of Appeals for the Fourth Circuit vacated by Judge Morris Ames Soper.

His confirmation by the United States Senate was unusually protracted for the era because of the effects of Brown v. Board of Education and "Massive Resistance" upon the circuit's jurisdiction, alongside his past association with Thurgood Marshall. Southern Democrats delayed his confirmation with charges of "judicial activism", whilst Strom Thurmond said that he could not sit on a court dealing with "states' rights". After a lengthy debate, Sobeloff was confirmed in the Senate on July 16, 1956 by a vote of 64 to 19, with fourteen of the nineteen Senators who voted against him representing former Confederate states. He received his commission on July 18, 1956, and would play a major role ending "Massive Resistance" in Virginia a few years later. Sobeloff served as Chief Judge and as a member of the Judicial Conference of the United States from 1958 to 1964.

He assumed senior status on December 31, 1970. Sobeloff served in that capacity until his death on July 11, 1973, in Baltimore, MD. Sobeloff is buried in Hebrew Friendship Cemetery in Baltimore.

== Family ==
Sobeloff married Irene Ehrlich in May 1918 and they had two daughters and four grandchildren.

== See also ==
- List of Jewish American jurists

== Sources ==
- Solicitor General's Website

Legal offices
Preceded by Charles Markell	Chief Judge of the Maryland Court of Appeals; 1952–1954	Succeeded by Frederick Brune
Preceded by Walter J. Cummings Jr.	Solicitor General of the United States; 1954–1956	Succeeded by J. Lee Rankin
Preceded by Morris Ames Soper	Judge of the United States Court of Appeals for the Fourth Circuit; 1956–1970	Succeeded by Donald S. Russell
Preceded by John J. Parker	Chief Judge of the United States Court of Appeals for the Fourth Circuit; 1958–1964	Succeeded by Clement Haynsworth
