= John Carter Rose =

American judge (1861–1927)

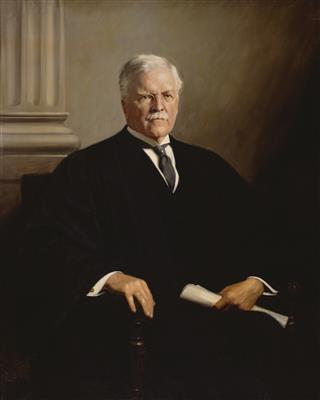

Judge of the United States Court of Appeals for the Fourth Circuit
- In office December 20, 1922 – March 26, 1927
- Appointed by: Warren G. Harding
- Preceded by: Seat established by 42 Stat. 837
- Succeeded by: Elliott Northcott

Judge of the United States District Court for the District of Maryland
- In office April 4, 1910 – December 26, 1922
- Appointed by: William Howard Taft
- Preceded by: Seat established by 36 Stat. 201
- Succeeded by: Morris Ames Soper

United States Attorney for the District of Maryland
- In office 1898–1910
- President: William McKinley; Theodore Roosevelt; William Howard Taft
- Preceded by: William L. Marbury
- Succeeded by: John P. Hill

Personal details
- Born: John Carter Rose; April 27, 1861 Baltimore, Maryland
- Died: March 26, 1927 (aged 65) Atlantic City, New Jersey
- Education: University of Maryland School of Law (LLB)

John Carter Rose (April 27, 1861 – March 26, 1927) was a United States circuit judge of the United States Court of Appeals for the Fourth Circuit; previously he was a judge of the United States District Court for the District of Maryland.

== Education and career ==
Born in Baltimore, Maryland, Rose received a Bachelor of Laws from the University of Maryland School of Law in 1882 and entered private practice in Baltimore. He also worked as an editorial writer for the Baltimore Sun. He was a supervisor of the 1890 United States Census in Baltimore. He was the United States Attorney for the District of Maryland from 1898 to 1910.

== Federal judicial service ==
Rose was nominated by President William Howard Taft on March 25, 1910, to the United States District Court for the District of Maryland, to a new seat authorized by 36 Stat. 201. He was confirmed by the United States Senate on April 4, 1910, and received his commission the same day. His service terminated on December 26, 1922, due to his elevation to the Fourth Circuit.

Rose was nominated by President Warren G. Harding on December 9, 1922, to the United States Court of Appeals for the Fourth Circuit, to a new seat authorized by 42 Stat. 837. He was confirmed by the Senate on December 20, 1922, and received his commission the same day. His service terminated on March 26, 1927, due to his death in Atlantic City, New Jersey.

== Sources ==
Legal offices
Preceded by Seat established by 36 Stat. 201	Judge of the United States District Court for the District of Maryland; 1910–1922	Succeeded by Morris Ames Soper
Preceded by Seat established by 42 Stat. 837	Judge of the United States Court of Appeals for the Fourth Circuit; 1922–1927	Succeeded by Elliott Northcott
