= Zaccheus Collins Lee =

American lawyer (1805–1859)

United States Attorney for the District of Maryland
- In office 1841–1845
- Appointed by: John Tyler
- Preceded by: Nathaniel Williams
- Succeeded by: William L. Marshall
- In office 1850–1853
- Appointed by: Millard Fillmore
- Preceded by: William L. Marshall
- Succeeded by: William M. Addison

Personal details
- Born: December 5, 1805
- Died: November 26, 1859 (aged 53)
- Spouse: Martha Ann Jenkins
- Children: 3
- Occupation: Jurist

Zaccheus Collins Lee (December 5, 1805 – November 26, 1859) was a jurist, who served as U.S. Attorney for the District of Maryland.

== Family ==
Born into the illustrious Lee Family of Virginia, he was the son of Richard Bland Lee (1761–1827) and his wife Elizabeth Collins (1768–1858). He was the seventh of their nine children and was named for his maternal uncle Zaccheus Collins. His first cousin was Robert E. Lee, his uncle Henry "Light Horse Harry" Lee.

He married Martha Ann Jenkins (April 5, 1819 – April 16, 1864) on June 15, 1837. The couple had three children;

- Richard Henry Lee (April 29, 1839 Baltimore – March 20, 1883); served as a private in the Confederate Army. Father of 4.
- Mary Elizabeth Lee (November 5, 1840 Baltimore – April 8, 1904 Rome, Italy); she married 1) William B. Perine (d. May 1863) and 2) Bernard John Cooper (d. July 26, 1889), a Post-Captain in the British Navy. Mother of 4.
- Mary Ida Lee (c. 1843); died at 6 months of age

== Education & career ==
From November 1827 to July 1828, Zaccheus attended the Winchester Law School, founded and taught by Henry St. George Tucker in Winchester, Frederick County, Virginia. He then attended the University of Virginia, and studied law under William Wirt.

After completing the bar, Lee practiced law in Baltimore, Maryland. He was the U.S. Attorney for the District of Maryland from 1841 to 1845, and again from 1850 to 1853. He was appointed Judge of the Superior Court of Baltimore in 1855 and served until his death.

He died at 5 o'clock in the evening on November 26, 1859, a Saturday, in Baltimore, as a result of an attack of paralysis, which had happened a few days previously.

== Legacy ==
- Lee was a classmate of Edgar Allan Poe, and was one of only a few people to attend Poe's funeral, as documented in letters from Neilson Poe.
- In 1857, Lee interviewed an application by Edward Garrison Draper, a free black man, to be admitted to the Maryland bar as a lawyer. Draper was a graduate of Dartmouth College and had served several apprenticeships to other lawyers. Lee found Draper qualified on grounds of knowledge, but nevertheless refused to admit him due to Draper not being a white male. Denied a chance to practice law in Maryland, Draper departed for Liberia shortly after.
- An address of his was published in 1918 as; The Age of Washington: An address delivered before the Calocagathian and Reading Room Societies of St. Mary's College, discussing the subject of George Washington to St. Mary's Seminary.
