= Ogle Marbury =

American politician and judge (1882–1973)

Chief Judge of the Maryland Court of Appeals
- In office 1944–1952
- Preceded by: D. Lindley Sloan
- Succeeded by: Charles Markell

Attorney General of Maryland
- In office 1919
- Preceded by: Albert Ritchie
- Succeeded by: Alexander Armstrong

Member of the Maryland House of Delegates from the Prince George's County district
- In office 1910–1912 Serving with William R. C. Connick, Jeremiah J. Crowley, Millard Thorn, Oliver Samuel Metzerott, William R. Smallwood, Richard P. Whiteley

Personal details
- Born: August 23, 1882 Guilford, Maryland, U.S.
- Died: October 3, 1973 (aged 91)
- Party: Democratic
- Spouse: Eliza Gardner Cronmiller (before 1955)
- Children: 1
- Education: Baltimore City College
- Alma mater: Johns Hopkins University (BA); University of Maryland School of Law (LLB)
- Occupation: Politician; lawyer; judge

Ogle Marbury (August 23, 1882 – October 3, 1973) was an American politician and jurist who served as Chief Judge of the supreme court of the U.S. state of Maryland, the Court of Appeals.

== Early life and education ==
Marbury was born near Guilford, Howard County, Maryland, to Eleanora Brevitt (née MacKenzie) and Reverend Ogle Marbury. He was privately tutored as a youth, and also attended Baltimore City College and Deichmann Gymnasium School. He received his B.A. degree in 1902 from Johns Hopkins University, and his LL.B. degree from the University of Maryland School of Law in 1904.

In 1904, Marbury was admitted to the Maryland Bar and entered into private practice in Prince George's County and Baltimore. He worked with the firm of Marbury & Perlman, and later partnered with Lee I. Hecht.

== Career ==
From 1910 to 1912, Marbury served as a member of the Maryland House of Delegates, representing Prince George's County. In the House, he was chairman of the Ways and Means Committee in 1912, and also as Democratic Floor Leader that same year.

Marbury worked as an attorney for the Prince George's County Commissioners from 1914 to 1918, and again from 1937 to 1941, and was also an attorney for the Prince George's County Board of Education from 1916 to 1937. He served as Assistant Attorney General of Maryland from 1916 to 1920, and briefly served in an acting capacity as Attorney General of Maryland in 1919. He was an at-large delegate to the 1920 Democratic National Convention, and chairman of the Maryland State Board of Prison Control from 1920 to 1923. He also served as City Solicitor of Laurel, Maryland from 1929 to 1941, and as President of the Maryland State Bar Association in 1946.

In 1940, Marbury served as an associate judge and chief judge of the 7th Circuit of the Prince George's County Circuit Court. He served as an associate judge of the Maryland Court of Appeals from 1941 to 1944, and as Chief Judge of that court from 1944 to 1952.

== Personal life ==
Marbury married Eliza Gardner Cronmiller (died 1955), with whom he had one daughter: Anne Tasker Ogle Marbury Oberweiser. He was an Episcopalian.

Marbury died on October 3, 1973.

Legal offices
Preceded by Albert Ritchie	Attorney General of Maryland (acting); 1919	Succeeded by Alexander Armstrong
Preceded by D. Lindley Sloan	Chief Judge of the Maryland Court of Appeals; 1944–1952	Succeeded by Charles Markell
