= Michael L. Vaughn =

American politician (born 1957)

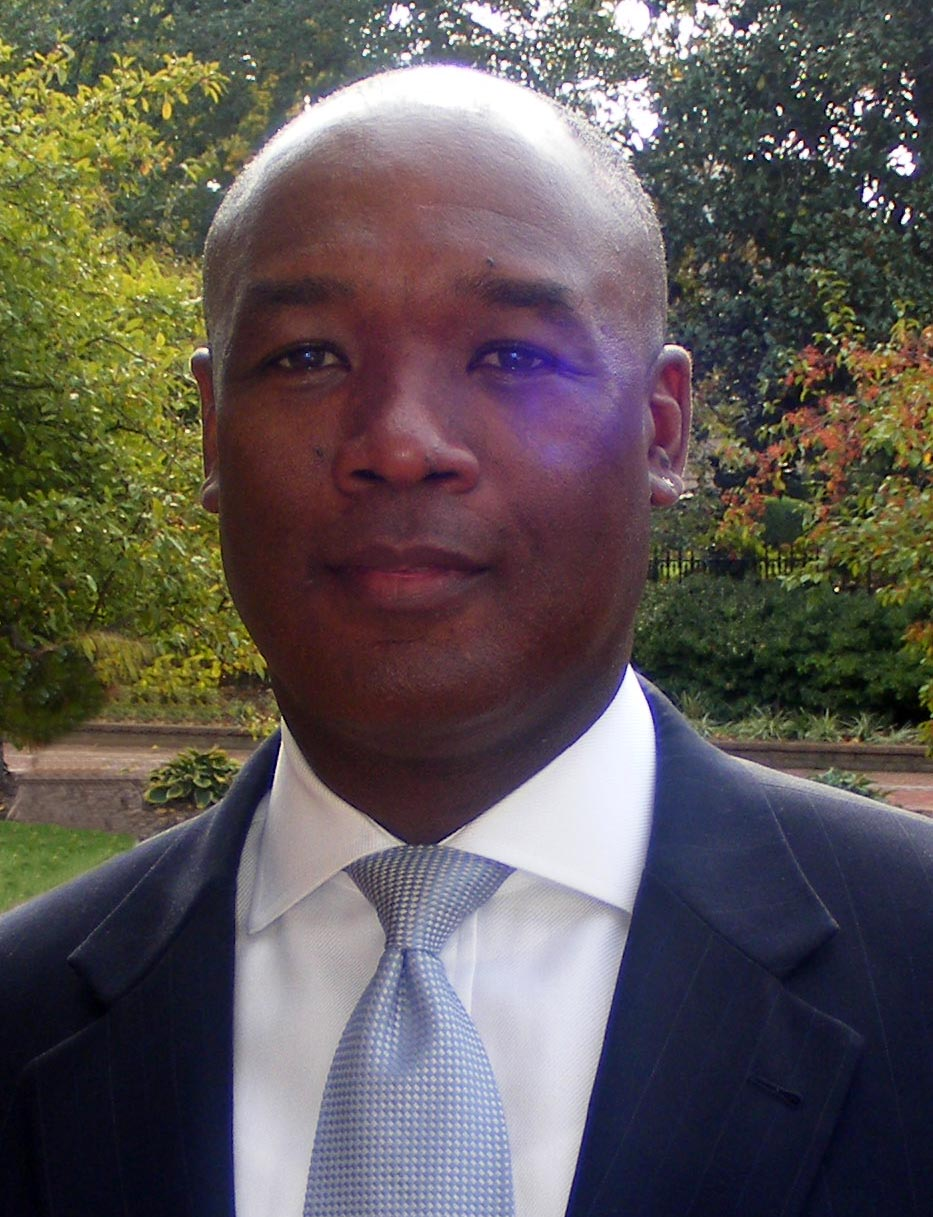
- Vaughn in 2007

Member of the Maryland House of Delegates from the 24th district
- In office January 8, 2003 – January 11, 2017
- Succeeded by: Jazz Lewis

Personal details
- Born: November 12, 1957 (age 69) Tuskegee, Alabama, U.S.
- Party: Democratic
- Occupation: Investment broker

Michael L. Vaughn (born November 12, 1957) is an American politician who represented District 24 as a Democrat in the Maryland House of Delegates from 2003 until his resignation in 2017.

== Background ==
Vaughn was born in Tuskegee, Alabama, and grew up in Prince George's County, Maryland, where he attended DuVal High School. He graduated from Southern University, where he played football. He went on to work as an investment advisor with Merrill Lynch, Dean Witter, and Fidelity Investments.

== Conviction ==
On January 11, 2017, just minutes before the start of the 2017 legislative session, Vaughn resigned his seat in the Maryland House of Delegates.

Vaughn was convicted of a long running bribery and conspiracy scheme for accepting cash bribes. He resigned his seat and was sentenced to four years in prison with three years of probation.

== In the legislature ==
Vaughn was a member of House of Delegates from January 8, 2003, until January 11, 2017. He was appointed the Deputy Majority Whip in 2006 and was a member of the House Economic Matters Committee. Vaughn was also the chairman of that committee's science & technology subcommittee. He was a member of the Legislative Black Caucus of Maryland and chairman of the Legislative Black Caucus' foundation. He is also Co-Chair of the Task Force on Lending Equity in Financial Institutions Providing State Depository Services.

=== Legislative notes ===
- Voted for the Clean Indoor Air Act of 2007 (HB359)
- Voted against slot machines in 2005 (HB1361)
- Voted for the Tax Reform Act of 2007(HB2)
- Voted in favor of in-state tuition for students who attended Maryland high schools for at least two years. (HB6)(2007) (HB6)
- Sponsored House Bill 30 in 2007, allowing the state to confiscate unused portions of gift certificates after four years.

== Awards ==
- 2010 Most Influential Maryland Legislators (Top 20)

== Controversy ==
In August 2010, Vaughn became involved in controversy when it was learned that he had not played for the Dallas Cowboys for three years as had been stated in his official biography.
