= United States Attorney for the District of Maryland =

Chief federal law enforcement officer for the State of Maryland, US

The U.S. attorney for the District of Maryland is the chief federal law enforcement officer for the State of Maryland. Since February 2025, the United States attorney for the District of Maryland is Kelly O. Hayes.

The United States District Court for the District of Maryland has jurisdiction over all cases prosecuted by the U.S. Attorney.

== Organization ==
The office is organized into divisions handling civil, criminal, and civil rights matters.

== U.S. attorneys for the District of Maryland ==
- Richard Potts 1789–1792
- Zebulon Hollingsworth 1792–1806
- John Stephen 1806–1810
- Thomas Beale Dorsey 1811–1812
- Elias Glenn 1812–1824
- Nathaniel Williams 1824–1841
- Zaccheus Collins Lee 1841–1845
- William L. Marshall 1845–1850
- Zaccheus Collins Lee 1850–1853
- William M. Addison 1853–1862
- William Price 1862–1865
- William J. Jones 1865–1866
- William Price 1866–1867
- Andrew Sterett Ridgley 1867–1869
- Archibald Stirling Jr. 1869–1886
- Thomas Gordon Hayes 1886–1890
- John T. Ensor 1890–1894
- William L. Marbury 1894–1898
- John C. Rose 1898–1910
- John P. Hill 1910–1915
- Samuel K. Dennis 1915–1920
- Robert R. Carman 1920–1922
- Amos W. W. Woodcock 1922–1931
- Simon E. Sobeloff 1931–1934
- Bernard J. Flynn 1934–1953
- George Cochran Doub 1953–1956
- Walter Evan Black Jr. 1956–1957
- Leon H. A. Pierson 1957–1961
- Joseph D. Tydings 1961–1963
- Robert H. Kernon 1963
- Thomas J. Kenney 1963–1967
- Stephen H. Sachs 1967–1970
- George Beall 1970–1975
- Jervis S. Finney 1975–1978
- Russell T. Baker 1978–1981
- Herbert Better* 1981
- J. Frederick Motz 1981–1985
- Catherine C. Blake* 1985–1986
- Breckinridge L. Willcox 1986–1991
- Richard D. Bennett 1991–1993
- Gary P. Jordan* 1993
- Lynne A. Battaglia 1993–2001
- Stephen Schenning* 2001
- Thomas M. DiBiagio 2001–2004
- Allen F. Loucks* 2005
- Rod Rosenstein 2005-2017
- Stephen M. Schenning* 2017–2018
- Robert K. Hur 2018–2021
- Jonathan F. Lenzner* 2021
- Erek Barron 2021–2025
- Phil Selden* 2025
- Kelly O. Hayes 2025-Present

* designates interim U.S. Attorneys who served when there was no presidentially-appointed U.S. Attorney.
