= Services for mental disorders =

Support services for mental health conditions

Services for mental health disorders provide treatment, support, or advocacy to people who have psychiatric illnesses. These may include medical, behavioral, social, and legal services.

Medical services are usually provided by mental health experts like psychiatrists, psychologists, and behavioral health counselors in a hospital or outpatient clinic. Behavioral services go hand-in-hand with medical services, referring specifically to pharmacological and cognitive therapy. Social services are usually provided by the government or nonprofit organizations. They arrange housing options, job training, or other community resources overseen by experienced professionals to ensure overall productivity and well-being of individuals with mental illnesses. Legal services ensure that people with mental health disorders are not discriminated against in society and advocate for their basic human rights. In addition, legal services make sure that those individuals who might be a danger to themselves or others are diverted away from the judicial system to receive adequate treatment for underlying mental health issues.

The information provided below is primarily regarding services offered within the United States of America, unless otherwise specified.

== Medical services ==
There are several types of medical service settings that can serve to deliver mental health care or services. These include, but are not limited to family practice, psychiatric hospitals or clinics, general hospitals, and community mental or behavioral health centers. One medical service that is not used as much is the self-help plan. The self-help plan is where a person with mental illness addresses their condition then find strategies to get better. This may include addressing any triggers, recovery options or warning signs. Different services endorse different payment models. Some may be more government-based or patient-based, while others may endorse mixed-models payment systems. Not all service types or institutions are accessible by all patients. A considerable barrier surrounds the difficulty in finding in-network mental health care providers, given the backdrop of our current and critical nationwide shortage of mental health professionals.

Family practice or general practice centers in communities are often the first line for assessment of mental health conditions. The basic services provided may include prescribing psychiatric drugs and sometimes providing basic counseling or therapy for "common mental disorders." Secondary medical services may include psychiatric hospitals, or clinics. However, given the trend towards the deinstitutionalization of mental health hospitals - the movement of mental health patients out of the "asylum-based" mental health care system towards community-oriented care - psychiatric hospitals have been going out of favor, with services being directed to wards within general hospitals as well as more locally based community mental health services.

Mental health services may be provided either on an inpatient or, more commonly, an outpatient basis. A wide range of treatments may be provided to patients, with a mainstay of treatment being centered on psychiatric drugs. However, medication does not cure any mental illness but it does help manage symptoms. Various mental health professionals may be involved including psychiatrists, psychiatric and mental health nurses and, less commonly, non-medical professionals such as clinical psychologists, social workers, and various kinds of therapists or counselors. Usually headed by psychiatrists and therefore based on a medical model, multidisciplinary teams may be involved in assertive community treatment and early intervention and may be coordinated via a case management system (sometimes referred to as "service coordination").

== Behavioral therapy services ==
Numerous services exist exclusively for the therapy of mental disorders and distress. Since symptoms vary across individuals, therapy is usually individualized for patients. All behaviors can be learned and also can be changed. Behavioral therapy is a method of therapy that is used to help identify unhealthy behaviors and to help change such behaviors. Methods exist that target numerous areas at once, such as integrative psychotherapy (an eclectic tailored mix of approaches). Integrative psychotherapists consider many factors when treating a patient, such as preferences, physical capabilities, or family support. In contrast to integrative psychotherapy, many approaches focus on particular areas. Cognitive behavioral therapy, psychodynamic therapy, interpersonal therapy, and dialectical behavioral therapy are all examples of approaches that have primary focuses when attempting to treat a patient. Conditions that can be treated by these therapies include anxiety, eating disorders, substance use disorders, obsessive compulsive disorders, and insomnia. The chosen therapy depends on several factors, with patient preference being a significant one.

Each type of therapy has its own strengths and weaknesses. Cognitive behavioral therapy is an attempt to allow patients to realize any inaccurate thoughts they may have and to allow them to perceive situations differently. Roughly about 75% of people who have used the Cognitive behavior therapy have experience a great outcome, which shows how effective this type of therapy is. There is also another type of Cognitive thearpy which is called Cognitive behavioral play therapy. This therapy is particularly used for children. It is done by the therapist watching the child play then determining what the child is uncomfortable expressing. Psychodynamic therapy differs from cognitive behavioral therapy in that it is a longer-term therapy that usually requires more sessions for its effectiveness. Psychodynamic therapy is less structured and relies heavily on the relationship between the therapist and the patient. Although cognitive behavioral therapy has become the more favored form of therapy, psychodynamic therapy continues to be viewed as the more effective treatment. An integrative approach would allow one therapist to implement both cognitive behavioral therapy and psychodynamic therapy while treating the same patient. Interpersonal therapy is highly structured and is usually targeted at depression. There is evidence that suggests interpersonal therapy provides a benefit that is equal to pharmacologic therapy for depression. Dialectical behavioral therapy is an evidence-based psychotherapy that is usually used to treat suicidal behaviors. Each form of behavioral therapy uses different strategies to reach the goal of improving the quality of life for patients.

== Social services ==
Community-based social services often include supportive housing, clubhouses, and national hotlines. These resources may be provided by people who are successfully living with psychiatric disorders. Peer-led support encourage those individuals struggling with mental health disorders to seek self-help strategies and belong to social support network.

=== Supportive housing ===
Supportive housing is an innovative solution that aims to provide permanent, accessible, and affordable housing options for individuals with mental health disorders. Additional help is often available to manage one's finances, daily activities, and healthcare needs. Rent is usually less than 30 percent of one's income and is further made affordable through rental assistance programs offered by the government. It, also, provides access to public transportation as well as healthcare providers and other community resources. In supervised or partially-supervised supportive housing, trained staff may be present to help with medication management, paying bills, cleaning, cooking, and other day-to-day tasks. These environments are usually group home settings, where individuals have their own bedroom and bathroom but share common areas with other residents. Alternatively, individuals may also choose to live in independent supportive housing if they do not require frequent supervision regarding their activities of daily living. Tenants have the freedom to choose which services they would like to utilize based on their degree of independence and unmet needs.

One of the limitations that prevent the widespread availability of supportive housing is the cost associated with hiring trained staff and maintaining the building as well as surrounding premises, while still keeping the rent affordable. However, studies have shown that the integrated services offered by supportive housing helps to decrease homelessness, incarceration rates, emergency room visits, and the number of days patients stay in a hospital. Such widespread effects can promote the lowering of costs associated with services in the above-mentioned areas and these funds can be diverted to sustain supportive housing projects.

=== Clubhouse model ===
Clubhouses are community centers that are usually run by individuals who have a current or previous history of mental illness. The main purpose of these establishments is to promote rehabilitation and self-sufficiency of individuals by offering them employment opportunities. This includes access to community workshops, job training programs, and educational opportunities. Additionally, clubhouse staff may maintain partnerships with local employers to provide full-time or part-time employment opportunities. Members, also, have access to social events and team-based activities, which helps them to develop a social support network.

=== Phone-based services ===
A mental health hotline is a free, confidential, and convenient way to receive information regarding various mental health services that are available in the community. The hotline is operated by trained employees and volunteers who can connect callers with the appropriate medical, legal, or social resources. There are no restrictions regarding how many times an individual may utilize a particular hotline. Some services may be available 24 hours a day, 7 days a week and via text messaging applications.

A few phone-based services exclusively deal with mental health emergencies or crisis situations, such as suicide and substance abuse. Suicide prevention lifelines are operated by mental health counselors or community volunteers. They are trained to identify suicide risk, de-escalate an emergent crisis, and provide emotional support for those in distress. Substance abuse and relapse helplines provide behavioral support to those struggling with addiction as well as connect them with rehabilitation centers for treatment.

Phone-based services also allow for providers to remove language barriers. This is due to the fact that there are several online translation services in order to record and relay information in real time, across several different languages. By eliminating language barriers, providers are also able to prevent patients from experiencing social prejudice. Patients can now reach out to a wider variety of providers and are no longer bound to their local community practitioners, where there could be added stigma.

=== Telehealth services ===
The use of Telehealth, health related services distributed electronically, has exploded in popularity across the world of medicine following the 2019-2020 COVID-19 pandemic. Remote health services have opened up a new dimension for healthcare providers to provide care to patients with efficiency and a wider range of accessibility. The inclusion of mental health services in this expansion has helped dispel the belief that mental health is not capable of being done electronically and has opened up new possibilities in the field of mental health services, and service provision. There are still limits restricting Telehealth including the fact that many people still do not have access to technology such as phones and computers, and that it cannot replace more intensive treatment settings.

=== Apps providing psychological services ===
Mental health apps are an increasingly popular means of providing mental health services. The National Institute for Mental Health has pointed out the benefits of such apps being cost efficiency, accessibility, anonymity, and the additional supporting role they provide to other services for mental disorders. The same paper also cites limitations to mental health apps, including that not everyone has access to technology for the apps, data collection concerns, lack of regulation of app-based mental health services, and the potential for apps to dissuade users from accessing other forms of services with a longer track record of proven efficiency.

== Legal services ==
Legal services supervise the involuntary commitment or outpatient commitment of those judged to have mental disorders and to be a danger to themselves or others. Some legal organizations provide specialized services for those diagnosed with mental disorders who may be challenging discrimination or involuntary commitment.

Mental health courts are specialized court dockets that provide community treatment and supervision in lieu of incarceration for criminal offenders with mental illness. A judge assesses the defendant's background as well as the influence of his or her mental disorder on the committed crime. A team of mental health professionals and legal advisors ensures that a particular mental health treatment program provides appropriate opportunities for rehabilitation and prevent future criminal behavior. The defendant is given the choice to decide if they want to participate in the treatment, unless they are unable to provide informed consent. In such cases, a conservator could make treatment decisions on behalf of the defendant and may give permission to use medications, if appropriate. Successful completion of the program may result in reduced sentences or all charges against the defendant to be dropped.

== Global situation ==
=== Statistics ===
In 2017, more than 970 million or 1-in-7 individuals were purported to have one or more mental or substance use disorder(s). Anxiety and depressive disorders were, by far, the most attributed. Moreover, around 5%, and up to 12%, of global disease burden was attributable to mental or substance use disorders. Countries that have the greatest disease burden from mental or substance use disorders include Kuwait, Qatar, Australia, among others.

A Global Mental Health Group in coordination with the World Health Organization has called for an urgent scaling up of the funding, staffing and coverage of services for mental disorders in all countries, especially in low-income and middle-income countries.

According to the Recovery model, services must always support an individual's personal journey of recovery and independence, and a person may or may not need services at any particular time, or at all. The UK is moving towards paying mental health providers by the outcome results that their services achieve.

=== Traditional and alternative services ===
Traditional healing centers are popular worldwide and provide accessible mental health services for the native population. This community-based practice is led by folk healers, who use herbal remedies, spiritual rituals, and indigenous perspectives to provide comfort for individuals. These services are highly culture-specific and, therefore, its structure varies across the globe. Traditional healing approaches are sometimes used alongside conventional or western medicine.

In addition, each country has its own view on mental health disorders. While many nations share advocacy for mental health, there are still several countries that stigmatize medical or behavioral treatment for these disease states. Examples of these are Canada and China, such that both have high mental health illness rates but low utilization rates of mental health services. While the cause of this is unknown, it is believed to be due to general stigma in those communities towards seeking help for mental health.

== Problems with mental health services ==
=== Expanding increase in demand ===
As awareness of mental health increases more and more people require mental health services. According to studies in 2023 over half of adults(54.7%) suffering from a mental illness are not receiving treatment, and almost a 3rd(28.2%) of adults with mental illness cannot get the treatment they need. There is increasing demand for new paths to provide mental services such as telehealth to make the distribution of services more streamlined along with need for more service providers to account for growing demand for treatment.

=== Struggle to provide services for underserved communities ===
Service providers for mental health have long struggled to provide adequate care for underserved communities such as minorities, the homeless, and incarcerated populations. These groups generally are in need of greater amounts of care in part due to the adversities that have both created and perpetuated their situations like systemic racism, troubled backgrounds, access to housing, and poverty. There are barriers to access for mental health services that continue to make them inaccessible such as high cost, language barriers, and access to providers in many communities.

=== Systemic barriers ===
Many governments across the globe continue to neglect the importance of mental health services. The United States for example continues to not provide healthcare accommodation for mental health services and struggles to fulfill policies like The Mental Health and Addiction Parity Act of 2008 that are intended to make mental health services more accessible. Many governments continue to fail to recognize mental health services as important facets of healthcare and properly provide for them. Many countries still consider mental health a problem of which only high earning countries face and fail to recognize mental health as a developing struggle that affects people of all backgrounds.

=== Push toward change ===
There is an increasing push for new innovative ways to provide mental health services. Telehealth has been a massively eye opening success following its widespread usage during the 2019-2020 COVID-19 Pandemic and has changed the belief that mental health services cannot be useful when provided electronically. Suggestions such as governmental change and the creation of workers who bring mental health services to hard to reach communities and individuals have been theorized to be possible solutions. Apps for psychological services are also looked at as a promising new development that could greatly expand people's access to psychological services in the future due to their numerous benefits such as convenience, anonymity, and outreach.
