= Upton Buhrman =

American politician (1818–1895)

Member of the Maryland House of Delegates from the Frederick County district
- In office 1864–1867 Serving with Joshua Biggs, Thomas Hammond, David Rinehart, Oliver P. Snyder, Charles E. Trail, David Agnew, Samuel Keefer, David J. Markey, Thomas A. Smith, Henry Baker, Thomas Gorsuch, John L. Linthicum, John R. Rouzer, John A. Steiner
- Preceded by: Joshua Biggs, Hiram Buhrman, James M. Coale, Thomas Hammond, Henry R. Harris, Thomas Johnson
- Succeeded by: Ephraim Albaugh, Noah Bowlus, Joseph Byers, R. P. T. Dutrow, Thomas G. Maynard, Charles F. Wenner

Personal details
- Born: April 1818
- Died: May 4, 1895 (aged 77) near Van Clevesville, West Virginia, U.S.
- Party: Unconditional Union; Republican
- Children: 8
- Occupation: Politician; businessman; farmer

Upton Buhrman (April 1818 – May 4, 1895) was an American politician from Maryland. He served as a member of the Maryland House of Delegates, representing Frederick County, from 1864 to 1867.

== Early life ==
Upton Buhrman was born in April 1818. His siblings were Hiram, Alfred, Harvey, Emory, Mrs. Joseph Marken and Mrs. Conrad Easterday.

== Career ==
Burhman was a member of the Unconditional Union Party and the Republican Party. He served as a member of the Maryland House of Delegates, representing Frederick County, from 1864 to 1867. He helped pass a local option law to prohibit the sale of alcohol within three miles of Myersville churches. He was a delegate to the 1880 Republican National Convention.

Buhrman worked in mercantile business for about thirty years and owned a business in Myersville. After he moved to West Virginia, he farmed and conducted business.

== Personal life ==
Buhrman married. They had five sons and three daughters, Clayton, Harry, Charles, Webster, Edward, Mrs. William B. Evers and Mrs. Charles Grossnickle. He moved from Myersville to a home in Berkeley County, West Virginia, around 1891. His house burned on February 13, 1895. He was raised as a Methodist and later in life he associated with the Lutheran church.

Buhrman died from heart disease on May 4, 1895, aged 77, at his son-in-law's home near Van Clevesville, West Virginia.
