= Thomas Gorsuch =

American politician (died 1896)

Member of the Maryland House of Delegates from the Frederick County district
- In office 1867–1867 Serving with Henry Baker, Upton Buhrman, John L. Linthicum, John R. Rouzer, John A. Steiner
- Preceded by: David Agnew, Upton Buhrman, Samuel Keefer, David J. Markey, David Rinehart, Thomas A. Smith
- Succeeded by: Ephraim Albaugh, Noah Bowlus, Joseph Byers, R. P. T. Dutrow, Thomas G. Maynard, Charles F. Wenner

Personal details
- Born: Carroll County, Maryland, U.S.
- Died: March 23, 1896 Catoctin Furnace, Maryland, U.S.
- Resting place: Mount Olivet Cemetery
- Party: Unconditional Union; Republican
- Spouse: Ann Pole (died)
- Occupation: Politician; bank president; businessman

Thomas Gorsuch (died March 23, 1896) was an American politician from Maryland. He served as a member of the Maryland House of Delegates, representing Frederick County in 1867.

== Early life ==
Thomas Gorsuch was born in Carroll County, Maryland.

== Career ==
In 1851, Gorsuch moved to Frederick County and became an overseer of a farm owned by Jesse Coleman near Mount Pleasant. He was appointed as Assistant United States Assessor by President Abraham Lincoln and served until resigning after the election of Andrew Johnson.

Gorsuch was a member of the Unconditional Union Party and later the Republican Party. He served as a member of the Maryland House of Delegates, representing Frederick County in 1867. President Ulysses S. Grant appointed Gorsuch as Assistant United States Assessor and he held the role until it was discontinued.

Gorsuch engaged in mining in the west for a time. He worked as cashier for the First National Bank of Frederick. In 1874, he succeeded Lawrence J. Brengle as president of the bank and served in that role until his death. He was elected as clerk of the circuit court in 1873 and served for six years. He was on the board of alderman in Frederick. In 1881, he was defeated on the Republican ticket for state comptroller by Thomas J. Keating. He was president of Catoctin Mountain Iron Company.

== Personal life ==
Gorsuch married Ann Pole of Mount Pleasant. They had no children. His wife predeceased him.

Gorsuch died on March 23, 1896, aged 77 or 78, at his home in Catoctin Furnace. He was buried at Mount Olivet Cemetery.
