= John L. Linthicum =

American politician (1838–1906)

Member of the Maryland House of Delegates from the Frederick County district
- In office 1867–1867 Serving with Henry Baker, Upton Buhrman, Thomas Gorsuch, John R. Rouzer, John A. Steiner
- Preceded by: David Agnew, Upton Buhrman, Samuel Keefer, David J. Markey, David Rinehart, Thomas A. Smith
- Succeeded by: Ephraim Albaugh, Noah Bowlus, Joseph Byers, R. P. T. Dutrow, Thomas G. Maynard, Charles F. Wenner

Personal details
- Born: March 1838 Middletown, Maryland, U.S.
- Died: August 23, 1906 (aged 68) Atlantic City, New Jersey, U.S.
- Party: Unconditional Union Party; Republican
- Spouse: Margaret
- Occupation: Politician; businessman

John L. Linthicum (March 1838 – August 23, 1906) was an American politician from Maryland. He served as a member of the Maryland House of Delegates, representing Frederick County in 1867.

== Biography ==
John L. Linthicum was born in March 1838, in Middletown, Maryland.

Linthicum worked with his brothers in the iron business in Middletown. He was a member of the Unconditional Union Party and later the Republican Party. He served as a member of the Maryland House of Delegates, representing Frederick County in 1867.

Linthicum moved to Baltimore and worked as deputy appraiser in the Baltimore customs house. He was removed from the role when President Grover Cleveland was elected.

Linthicum married Margaret. Later in life, he lived at 14 East Madison Street in Baltimore. He died from Bright's disease on August 23, 1906, at Haddon Hall in Atlantic City, New Jersey.
