= Henry Baker (Maryland politician) =

American politician (died 1896)

Member of the Maryland House of Delegates from the Frederick County district
- In office 1867–1867 Serving with Upton Buhrman, Thomas Gorsuch, John L. Linthicum, John R. Rouzer, John A. Steiner
- Preceded by: David Agnew, Upton Buhrman, Samuel Keefer, David J. Markey, David Rinehart, Thomas A. Smith
- Succeeded by: Ephraim Albaugh, Noah Bowlus, Joseph Byers, R. P. T. Dutrow, Thomas G. Maynard, Charles F. Wenner

Personal details
- Died: February 24, 1896 (aged 79) Baltimore, Maryland, U.S.
- Resting place: Mount Olivet Cemetery; Frederick, Maryland, U.S.
- Party: Unconditional Union
- Children: 6
- Occupation: Politician

Henry Baker (died February 24, 1896) was an American politician from Maryland. He served as a member of the Maryland House of Delegates, representing Frederick County in 1867.

== Early life ==
The Baker family had a homestead called Oak Orchard in Frederick County, Maryland.

== Career ==
At the outbreak of the Civil War, Baker organized and trained a company of home guards. He took on the rank of captain.

Baker was a member of the convention for the Maryland Constitution of 1864. He was a member of the Unconditional Union Party. He served as a member of the Maryland House of Delegates, representing Frederick County in 1867. He introduced the bill that founded the Institute for the Deaf and Dumb in Frederick. He was director of the board for years.

== Personal life ==
Baker married. He had six children, Mrs. William McK. Reilly, Mrs. Victor Frey, Bettie D., Harry C., B. E. and J. E.

Baker lived in Liberty for 40 years, moved to Washington, D.C., and then lived in Baltimore for the last 10 years of his life. He was a member of the Methodist Episcopal Church and in Baltimore was a member of the First Methodist Episcopal Church.

Baker died on February 24, 1896, aged 79, at his 2127 Jefferson Street home in Baltimore. He was buried at Mount Olivet Cemetery in Frederick.
