= Vigilant Firehouse =

- U.S. National Register of Historic Places
- D.C. Inventory of Historic Sites
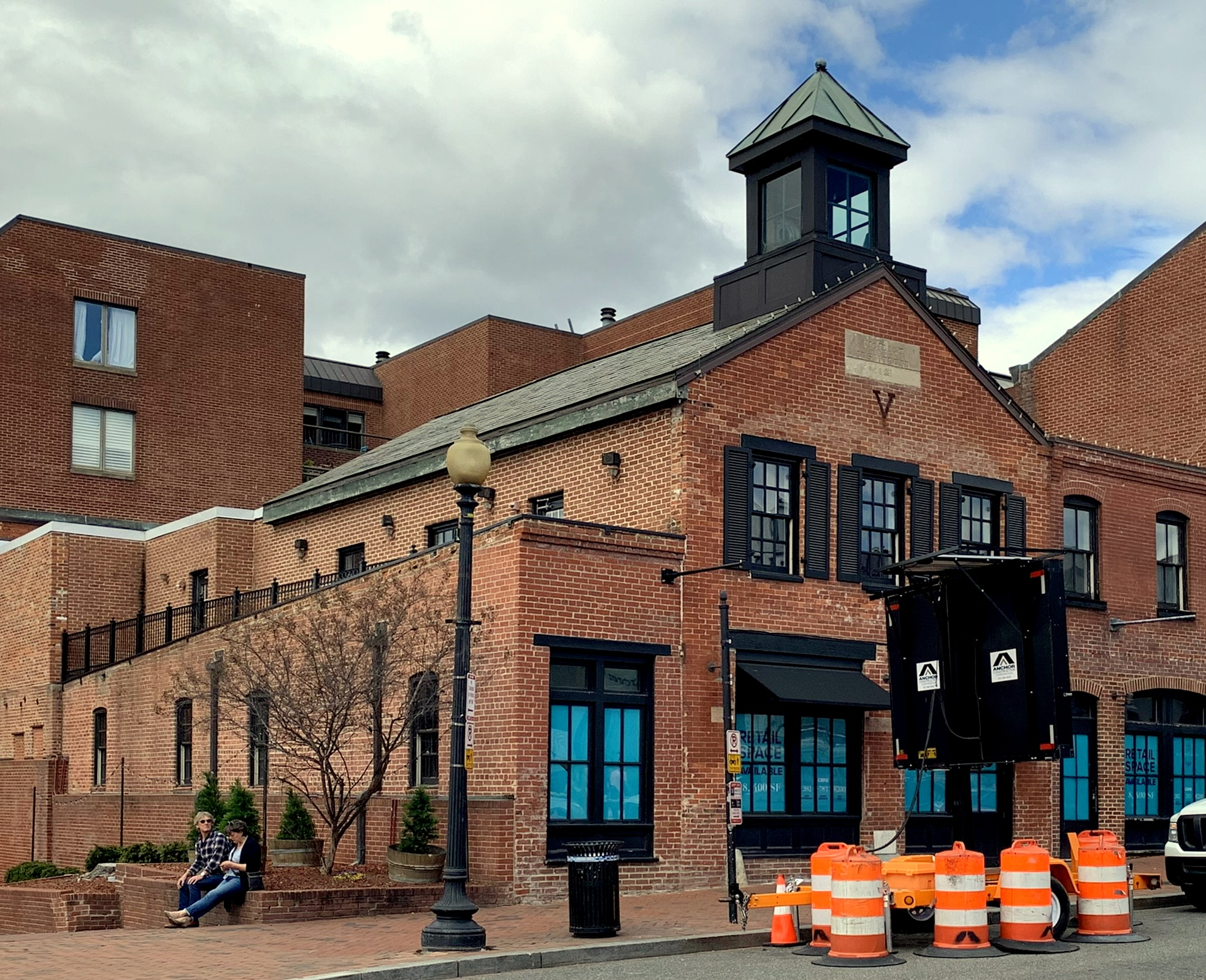
- Vigilant Firehouse in 2022

- Location within Washington, D.C.
- Location: 1066 Wisconsin Ave., NW., Washington, District of Columbia, USA
- Coordinates: 38°54′16.3″N 77°3′46.7″W
- Area: 0.5 acres (0.20 ha)
- Built: 1844
- NRHP reference No.: 71001008

Significant dates
- Added to NRHP: May 6, 1971
- Designated DCIHS: November 8, 1964

The Vigilant Firehouse is a historic building in the Georgetown section of Washington, D.C. located at 1066 Wisconsin Ave., NW, just north of the Chesapeake and Ohio Canal and the Canal Monument. The Vigilant Fire Company was organized in 1817 and this firehouse was built in 1844, making it the oldest extant firehouse in the District of Columbia. It was listed on the National Register of Historic Places in 1971.

Engine Company 5 was organized as a paid company on April 1, 1867 in this building as "Henry Addison Engine 5." In November 1883 Engine Company 5 moved around the corner to 3210 M Street, NW and the old firehouse was used for manufacturing. There are several stone markers on the site including one placed in 1869 to "Bush the Old Fire Dog."

== The Vigilants ==
The Vigilants were an early private fire company, formed in 1817 with John Kurz as president, James Moore as Secretary and James Corcoran as Treasurer. It was among the oldest fire companies in the District of Columbia, and the oldest in Georgetown. Its first fire engine, called the Vigilant, was bought from John Agnue of Philadelphia. After an 1848 reorganization, the company gradually came under the control of the government, forming Georgetown's Fire company No. 1 in 1867 and the District of Columbia's Fire Company No. 5 in 1871. In 1868 the company bought what is believed to be the first steam fire engine in the District of Columbia.

The Vigilant fireman developed a reputation for rowdyism.

About the year 1840, some members of the Vigilant and Western Star Companies built a bonfire on the Brick-Yard Hill and sent a messenger to the Union Company in the city to inform them that the business portion of the town was in danger of destruction. The Union in great haste soon arrived on the scene of the fire, and were so disgusted that the language used was neither select nor complementary. In return they received a volley of stones, their engines and lamps were broken and the crowd pursued them across the creek. The following day about forty arrests were made, the whites were fined and the slave received lashes.

Even saying the name of the company could draw a fine at early meetings of the Georgetown Fire Department, according to Albert Cassedy. "The proceedings of the meeting were so interesting that two members were fined ten cents each for swearing, and a resolution was passed that any member who mentioned the name of the Vigilant Fire Company should be fined 25 cents."

A stone tablet sits at ground level between the two main doorways and reads "Bush, the Old Fire Dog, Died of Poison, July 5th 1869, R.I.P." The story was related by Cassedy:

Bush was of mixed breed, of dark brown color, a volunteer of Fire Co. No. 1. He ran with the engine to all fires and parades and was a general favorite with all who chanced to form his acquaintance. He became careless about his diet, ate free lunch between meals and was taken suddenly ill July 4, 1869. The doctors pronounced it a hopeless case of arsenical poisoning, and after several severe spasms he passed peacefully in the sixth year of his age.

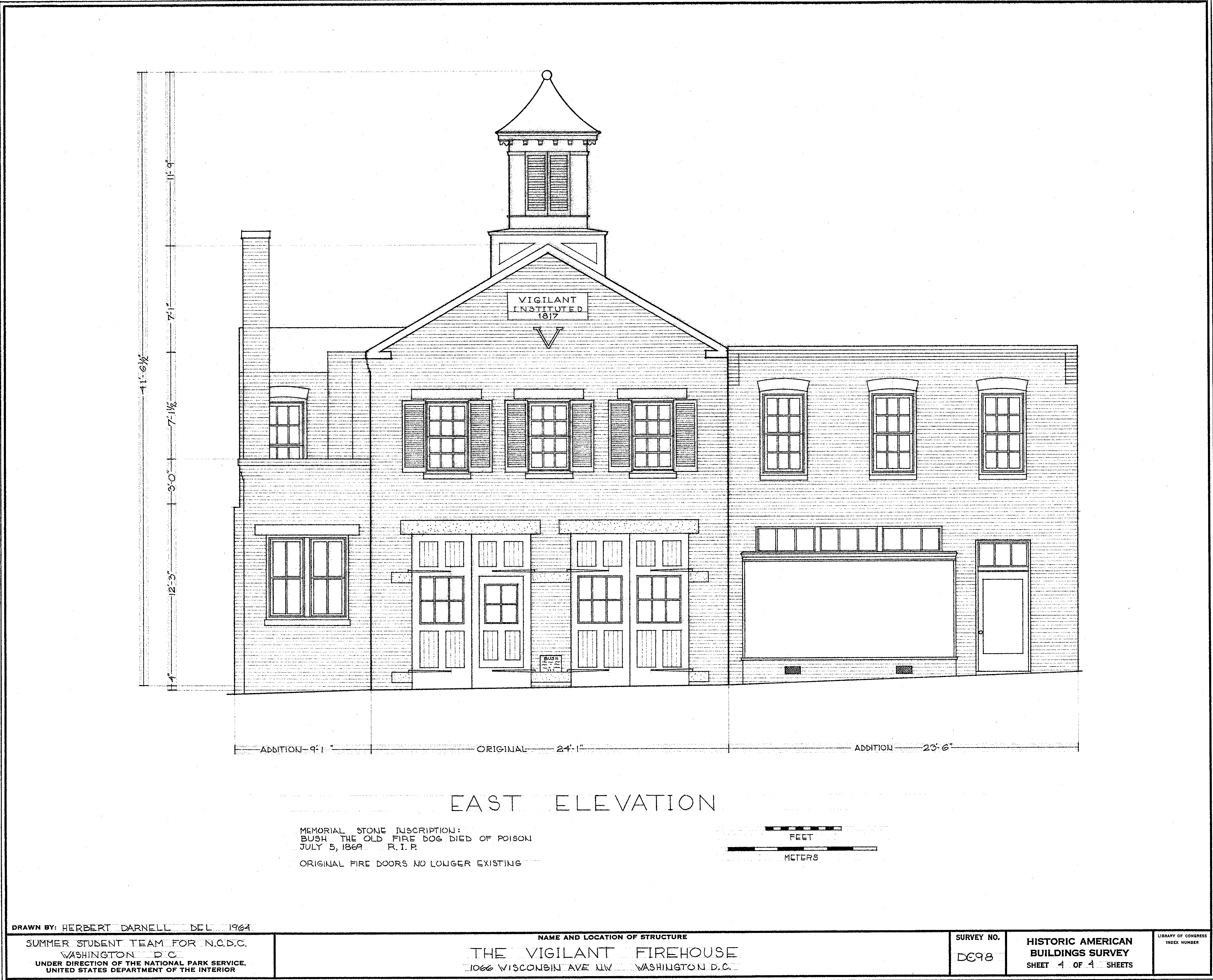
Historic American Buildings Survey drawing from 1964

== Architecture ==
A frame building was built on the site sometime before 1829. In 1843 this building was moved across the street to 1069 Wisconsin, where it stood until it was demolished in 1964. The current building was built in 1844 as a two-story 22 feet (6.7 m) by 44 feet (13 m) rectangle with a single room on each floor, a square wooden cupola and a gable facing the street. An early addition was a two-story shed in the rear, likely used as a stable on the first floor and for hay storage on the second. A single story shed was added to the south, and a two-story addition to the north, both of which run the full depth of the building. Including the additions, the building measures 56 feet (17 m) by 81 feet (25 m).

On the front gable a stone is inscribed "Vigilant, Instituted, 1817" and below this is a wrought iron "V", likely a trademark for the Vigilants. The "V" also serves as a tension rod tie and is matched by an "S" on the back of the building.

After 1883 the building was used for manufacturing, including the Palmer Bottling Works and then McKittrick, Inc., a mattress factory, until about 1970. A 2008 photograph shows the building in use as a restaurant.

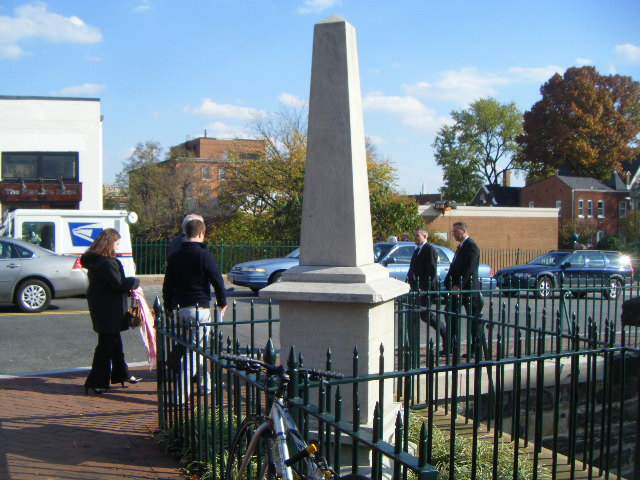
Chesapeake and Ohio Canal commemorative obelisk, immediately south of the firehouse

== Sources ==
- Historic American Buildings Survey, Vigilant Firehouse, 1964 (HABS), National Park Service, retrieved 2012-01-01.
- NRHP Nomination Form, Vigilant Firehouse, 1970, Nancy C. Taylor, National Capital Planning Commission, retrieved 2012-01-01.
