= Charles Edward Trail =

American politician (1826–1909)

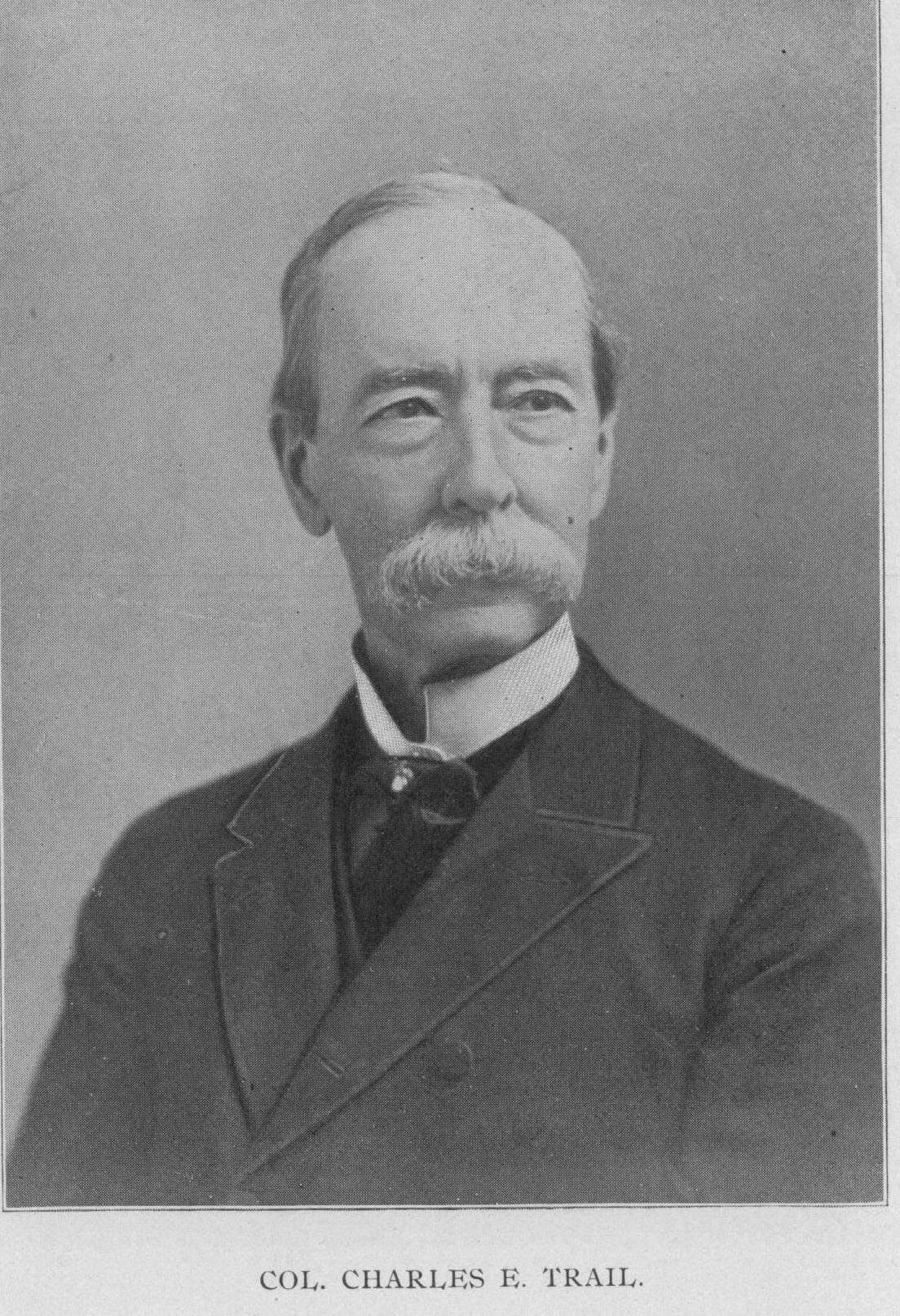
- Portrait of Trail

Member of the Maryland Senate from the Frederick County district
- In office 1865–1867
- Preceded by: Grayson Eichelberger
- Succeeded by: Joshua Biggs

Member of the Maryland House of Delegates from the Frederick County district
- In office 1863–1864 Serving with Joshua Biggs, Upton Buhrman, Thomas Hammond, David Rinehart, Oliver P. Snyder
- Preceded by: Joshua Biggs, Hiram Buhrman, James M. Coale, Thomas Hammond, Henry R. Harris, Thomas Johnson
- Succeeded by: David Agnew, Upton Buhrman, Samuel Keefer, David J. Markey, David Rinehart, Thomas A. Smith

Personal details
- Born: January 28, 1825 Frederick, Maryland, U.S.
- Died: May 8, 1909 (aged 84) Frederick, Maryland, U.S.
- Resting place: Mount Olivet Cemetery
- Party: Republican
- Spouse: Ariana McElfresh (m. 1851; died 1892)
- Children: 4, including Florence
- Education: Frederick College
- Occupation: Politician; landowner; businessman; lawyer

Charles Edward Trail (January 28, 1825 – May 8, 1909) was a prominent Frederick County, Maryland, landowner, businessman and a member of the Maryland General Assembly, an officer in the 1st Maryland Infantry, Potomac Home Brigade as well as a member of the city council of Frederick, Maryland.

== Early life ==
Charles Edward Trail was born on January 28, 1825, in Frederick, Maryland, to Edward Traill (sic, 1798 – 1876) and Lydia Ramsburg (1802 – 18?) in Frederick, Maryland. He had Scotch-Irish ancestry. The 1850 census records show that Trail was a young lawyer living with his parents in Frederick town.

Trail received a classical education at Frederick College,and was admitted to the bar in 1849.

== Career ==
In 1852, Trail was one of the founding incorporators for the Mount Olivet Cemetery in Frederick Maryland. In the 1860 US census, Trail was listed again as a lawyer but with property valued at $115,000 (equivalent to $4,121,000 in 2025), a wife (Ariana), and four children. The separate 1860 Slave census shows Trail with three slaves. That same year, Trail was elected president of the Isabella gas works company in Frederick, eventually becoming the sole stock holder.

In August 1862, Trail was appointed lieutenant-colonel, 1st Maryland Infantry, Potomac Home Brigade. Seven companies of which were mustered into service and encamped in August near the turnpike, about a mile and a half north of Frederick. On October 15, 1869, President U.S. Grant and his party (including General Sherman) stayed in Frederick in 1869 while visiting the Antietam battleground. General Sherman stayed with Trail during the visit.

Trail was a Republican. He served in the Maryland House of Delegates, representing Frederick County, from 1863 to 1864. He served as a member of the Maryland Senate, representing Frederick County, from 1865 to 1867. In 1870, he was president of the board of aldermen for the City of Frederick, a post he held for three years. That same year he was elected a director of the Frederick and Pennsylvania Line Railroad Company and then President of the railroad in 1878.

In 1878, Trail became president of the Farmers' and Mechanics' bank of Frederick County. The bank had been raided by Confederate troops during the Civil War and lost US$17,000. In 1881, Trail was made a director for the Mutual Insurance company of Frederick County.

== Personal life ==
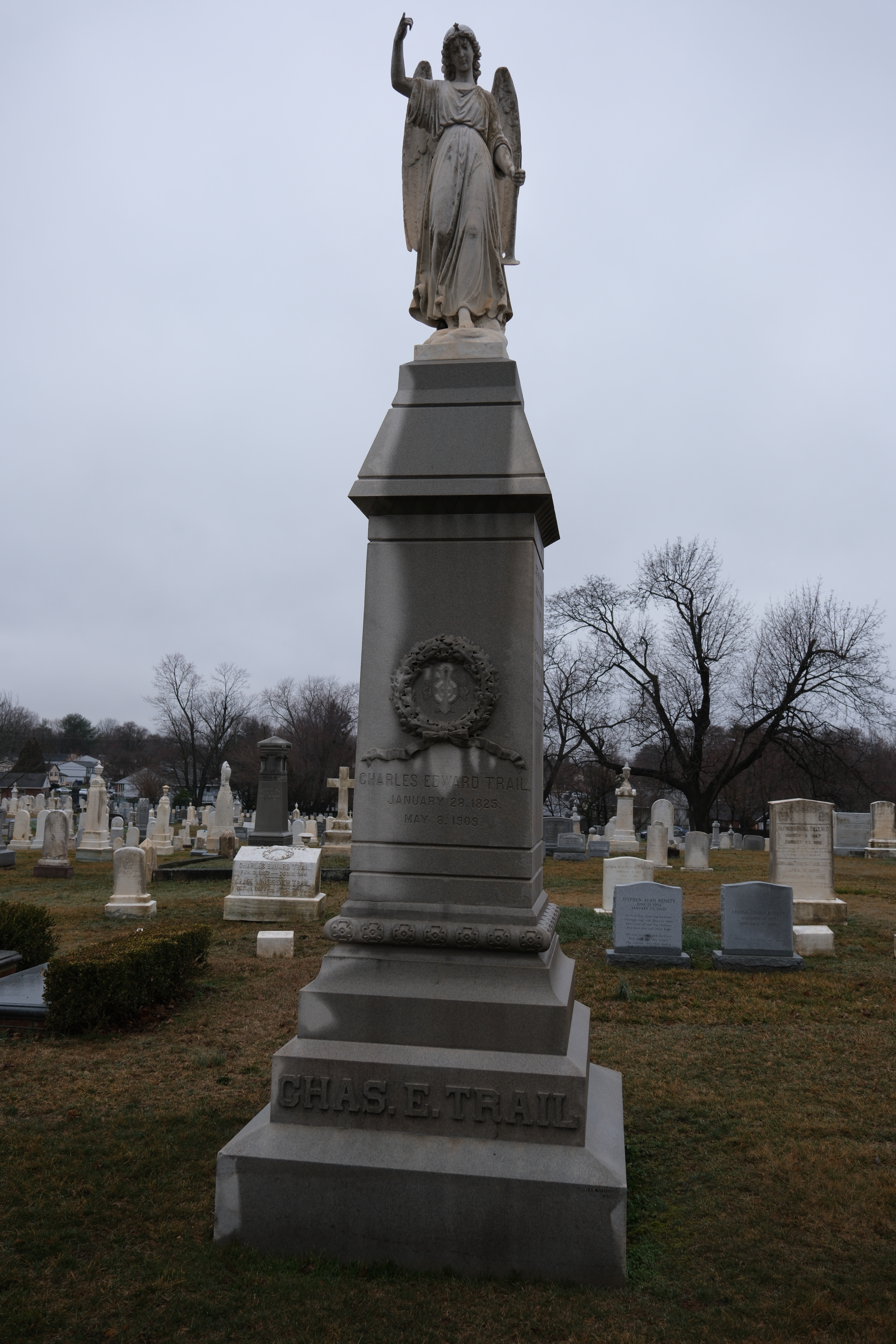
Grave of Trail in Mount Olivet Cemetery

In 1851, Trail married Ariana McElfresh, the daughter of one of the wealthiest landowners in Frederick, John H. McElfresh (1796 – 1841). Ariana's mother was the former Theresa Mantz. Her father was born near New Market, Frederick County, Maryland, the son of Henry and Ariana (Hammond) McElfresh and attended Frederick College; University of Maryland Medical School, 1817 as well as studying Medicine under Dr. L. T. Hammond, of Anne Arundel County, 1813 and then law under John Nelson of Frederick; admitted to the bar, 1825. They had four children, author Florence Trail, Ariana Teresa, Charles Bayard and Anna M. His wife died in 1892.

On June 12, 1877, Trail was injured in a Baltimore & Ohio railroad train wreck at Point of Rocks by a train bound to Washington and Mt. Vernon. Five persons were killed outright, and a large number seriously injured when two passenger coaches filled with excursionists to Washington and Mt. Vernon were telescoped. Trail was rescued from the smashup by John C. Hardt & William S. Bennett.

Trail died on May 8, 1909, at his home in Frederick, Maryland. His funeral was held on May 11 and he was buried at Mount Olivet Cemetery in Frederick. One of his great-grandsons was three-term U.S. Senator Charles "Mac" Mathias of Maryland.
