= David Agnew (Maryland politician) =

American politician (1822–1888)

Member of the Maryland House of Delegates from the Frederick County district
- In office 1865–1866 Serving with Upton Buhrman, Samuel Keefer, David J. Markey, David Rinehart, Thomas A. Smith
- Preceded by: Joshua Biggs, Upton Buhrman, Thomas Hammond, David Rinehart, Oliver P. Snyder, Charles E. Trail
- Succeeded by: Henry Baker, Upton Buhrman, Thomas Gorsuch, John L. Linthicum, John R. Rouzer, John A. Steiner

Personal details
- Born: January 1, 1822 Emmitsburg, Maryland, U.S.
- Died: September 1, 1888 (aged 66) near Emmitsburg, Maryland, U.S.
- Resting place: Emmitsburg Presbyterian Church cemetery
- Occupation: Politician; tailor

David Agnew (January 1, 1822 – September 1, 1888) was an American politician from Maryland.

== Biography ==
David Agnew was born on January 1, 1822, in Emmitsburg, Maryland. He was trained at a young age in tailoring.

Agnew worked in the livery business. He served as justice of the peace, constable and town commissioner. He served as a member of the Maryland House of Delegates, representing Frederick County from 1865 to 1866.

Agnew was a member of the Emmitsburg Presbyterian Church. He died of pulmonary consumption on September 1, 1888, at his son-in-law's home near Emmitsburg. He was buried at Emmitsburg Presbyterian Church cemetery.
