= Stephen R. Bowlus =

American politician (1822–1894)

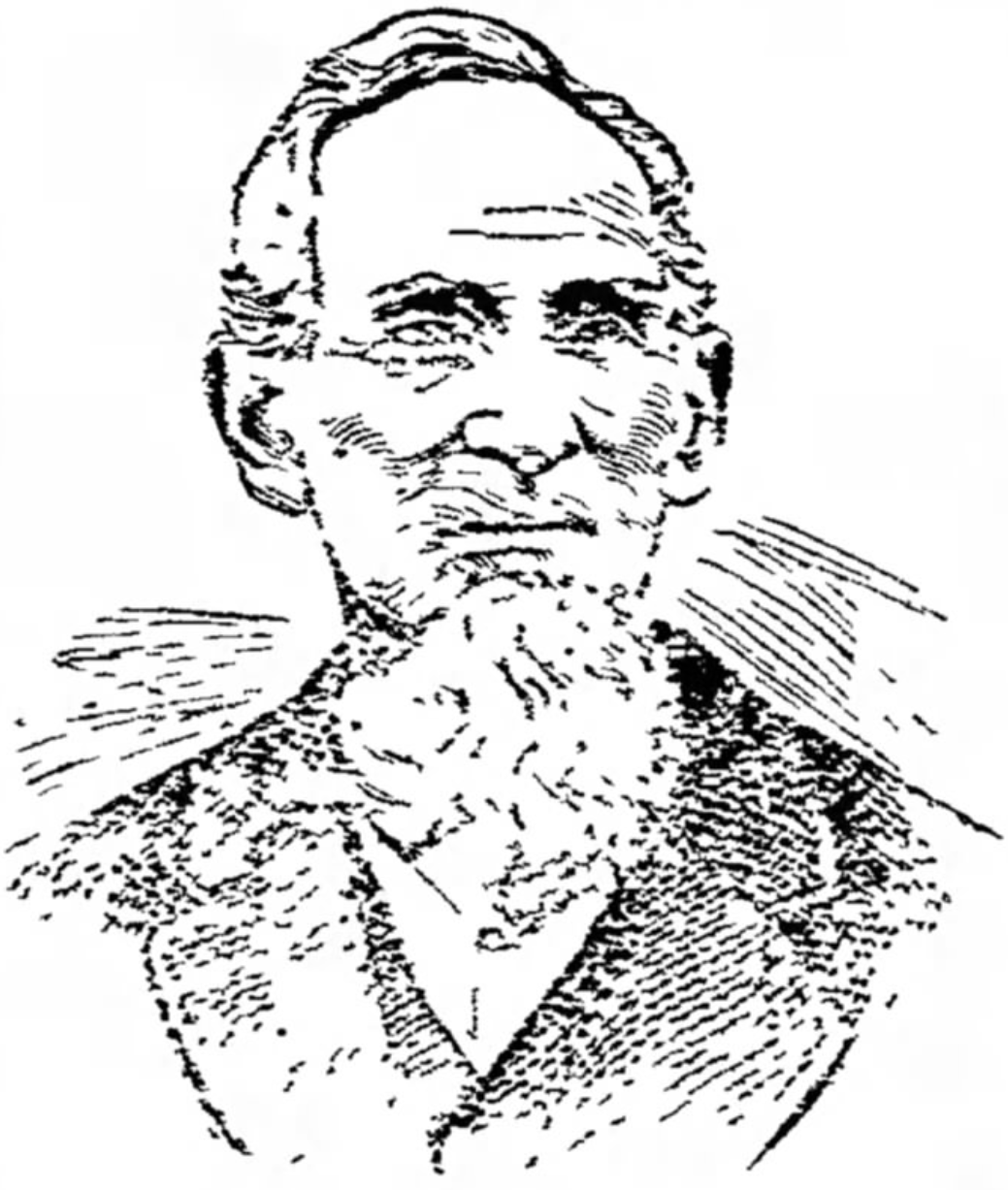
- Bowlus in an 1894 newspaper

Member of the Maryland House of Delegates from the Frederick County district
- In office 1858–1860 Serving with Ulysses Hobbs, Oliver P. Harding, John A. Koons, Jacob Root, John B. Thomas
- Preceded by: Lawrence J. Brengle, James S. Carper, James L. Davis, Daniel Grove, Peter Hauver, William N. Wolfe
- Succeeded by: Thomas J. Claggett, John A. Johnson, Andrew Kessler, Daniel W. Naill, Jonathan Routzahn, William E. Salmon

Personal details
- Born: August 31, 1822 near Middletown Valley, Frederick County, Maryland, U.S.
- Died: January 18, 1894 (aged 71) near Broad Run, Maryland, U.S.
- Resting place: Lutheran Cemetery; Middletown Valley, Maryland, U.S.
- Party: Democratic (before 1861); Republican (1861 and after)
- Spouse: Ann Caroline Remsburg
- Children: 8
- Occupation: Politician; farmer

Stephen R. Bowlus (August 31, 1822 – January 18, 1894) was an American politician from Maryland. He served as a member of the Maryland House of Delegates, representing Frederick County from 1858 to 1860.

== Early life ==
Stephen R. Bowlus was born on August 31, 1822, near Middletown Valley, Frederick County, Maryland, to Nicholas Bowlus.

== Career ==
Bowlus was a Democrat. He served as a member of the Maryland House of Delegates, representing Frederick County from 1858 to 1860. After the start of the Civil War, he became a Republican. He served as a member of the board of county commissioners for Frederick County from 1856 to 1857 and from 1878 to 1879.

Bowlus was commander of Company B of the Middletown Home Guards during the start of the Civil War. Around 1862, he moved from Middletown Valley to Broad Run. He was a farmer and was a member of the Lutheran church in Jefferson and served as superintendent of the Union Sunday school in Broad Run.

== Personal life ==
Bowlus married Ann Caroline Remsburg, daughter of Israel Remsburg, of Middletown. They had four sons and four daughters, Franklin L., Lewis H., Samuel L., Stephen R. Jr., Eliza A. V., Mary F., Julia K. and Melissa E.

Bowlus died from grip on January 18, 1894, at his home near Broad Run. He was buried in the Lutheran cemetery in Middletown Valley.
