= Oliver P. Snyder (Maryland politician) =

American politician (died 1874)

Member of the Maryland House of Delegates from the Frederick County district
- In office 1864–1864 Serving with Joshua Biggs, Upton Buhrman, Thomas Hammond, David Rinehart, Charles E. Trail
- Preceded by: Joshua Biggs, Hiram Buhrman, James M. Coale, Thomas Hammond, Henry R. Harris, Thomas Johnson
- Succeeded by: David Agnew, Upton Buhrman, Samuel Keefer, David J. Markey, David Rinehart, Thomas A. Smith

Personal details
- Died: April 15, 1874 (aged 40) New Market, Maryland, U.S.
- Occupation: Politician; merchant

Oliver P. Snyder (died April 15, 1874) was an American politician from Maryland.

== Biography ==
Snyder served as a member of the Maryland House of Delegates, representing Frederick County in 1864. After, he served as sergeant-at-arms of the Maryland House of Delegates. He worked as a merchant.

Snyder married. He died of consumption on April 15, 1874, aged 40, at his home in New Market.
