= John A. Steiner =

American politician (1816–1902)

Member of the Maryland House of Delegates from the Frederick County district
- In office 1867–1867 Serving with Henry Baker, Upton Buhrman, Thomas Gorsuch, John R. Rouzer, John L. Linthicum
- Preceded by: David Agnew, Upton Buhrman, Samuel Keefer, David J. Markey, David Rinehart, Thomas A. Smith
- Succeeded by: Ephraim Albaugh, Noah Bowlus, Joseph Byers, R. P. T. Dutrow, Thomas G. Maynard, Charles F. Wenner

Personal details
- Born: John Alexander Steiner; March 16, 1816 Frederick, Maryland, U.S.
- Died: April 20, 1902 (aged 86) Baltimore, Maryland, U.S.
- Resting place: Mount Olivet Cemetery; Frederick, Maryland, U.S.
- Party: Whig; Republican; Liberal Republican
- Spouse(s): Sophia Myers (m. 1837; died 1842) Mary Ann Brunner (m. 1844; died 1894)
- Children: 9
- Occupation: Politician; military officer; manufacturer; newspaper editor
- Military career
- Allegiance: United States
- Branch: Union Army
- Service years: 1861–1863
- Rank: Lieutenant colonel
- Unit: 1st Maryland Infantry Regiment, Potomac Home Brigade
- Conflicts: American Civil War

John Alexander Steiner (March 16, 1816 – April 20, 1902) was an American politician from Maryland. He served as a member of the Maryland House of Delegates, representing Frederick County in 1867.

== Early life ==
John Alexander Steiner was born on March 16, 1816, in Frederick, Maryland, to Susan (née Haller) and Henry Steiner. His father was a farmer and superintendent of the Alms House in Frederick County. Steiner was educated in schools of Frederick and Frederick County and at Frederick Academy (later Frederick College). He was educated for the ministry of the Reformed Church. Due to poor eyesight, he discontinued his studies for the ministry.

== Career ==
After leaving his studies, Steiner worked in shoe making, lumber, and brick manufacturing. He was appointed clerk of the Frederick County commissioners and was elected to the Board of Common Council in Frederick. At the outbreak of the Civil War, he along with William P. Maulsby and Edward Shriver organized the 1st Maryland Infantry Regiment, Potomac Home Brigade. He enlisted on October 22, 1861, as a major. He was promoted to lieutenant colonel on February 6, 1863. He was in charge of troops stationed at Druid Hill Park. He served with the regiment until he was honorably discharged in June 1863, but refused his discharge until after the Confederate Army was driven back to Virginia after the Battle of Gettysburg. He did not muster out until July 16, 1863. During his last months, he was affiliated with the Twelfth Army Corps and Lockwood's Brigade. For his service, the U.S. Senate breveted him as a brevet colonel and brevet brigadier general on March 13, 1865, for "faithful and meritorious services".

Prior to the war, Steiner was a Whig and afterward aligned with the Republican Party. In 1863, he served as sheriff of Frederick County for one term of two years. He served as a member of the Maryland House of Delegates, representing Frederick County, in 1867. After returning from the legislature, he continued the manufacturing of bricks. He then worked in the manufacturing of boots and shoes.

Steiner then associated with the Liberal Republican Party and was a delegate to the 1872 Liberal Republican convention. He then rejoined the Republican Party and was chairman of the Frederick County Republican Central Committee. In July 1882, Steiner was appointed inspector of the Port of Baltimore. He remained in that position for six years and mainly served as chief of the debenture department until 1888. He returned to Frederick and Reverend George Diehl purchased the Frederick Examiner and named Steiner as editor. He later retired.

Steiner was a member of the Junior Steam Engine Company No. 1 of Frederick for over 50 years. He was active in the Evangelical Reformed Church of Frederick and was elected as the congregation's deacon and elder. He was a delegate to the General Synod of the Reformed Church. He was elected vice president of the Synod of the Potomac at its session in Carlisle, Pennsylvania, on October 9, 1889. He was teacher, manager and superintendent of the Sunday school at Frederick for over 60 years.

== Personal life ==
Steiner married Sophia Myers on April 13, 1837. Their two children were Calvin Myers and Susan Sophia. His wife died in 1842. He married Mary Ann Brunner on September 19, 1844. Their seven children were Charles Henry, Mary Amelia, John Edgar, Ira Frank, Kate Brunner, Fannie Elizabeth and Edward Everett. His second wife died in 1894. In 1894, he moved to life with his daughter at 1711 West Fayette Street in Baltimore.

Steiner died on April 20, 1902, aged 86, at his daughter's home in Baltimore. He was buried in Mount Olivet Cemetery in Frederick.
