= Thomas Hammond (Maryland politician) =

American politician (1790–1874)

Member of the Maryland House of Delegates from the Frederick County district
- In office 1861–1864 Serving with Joshua Biggs, Hiram Buhrman, James M. Coale, Henry R. Harris, Thomas Johnson, Upton Buhrman, David Rinehart, Oliver P. Snyder, Charles E. Trail
- Preceded by: Thomas J. Claggett, John A. Johnson, Andrew Kessler, David W. Naill, Jonathan Routzahn, William E. Salmon
- Succeeded by: David Agnew, Upton Buhrman, Samuel Keefer, David J. Markey, David Rinehart, Thomas A. Smith
- In office 1832–1832 Serving with William Cost Johnson, David Schley, Abdiel Unkefer
- Preceded by: William Cost Johnson, Abraham Jones, Evan McKinstry, Davis Richardson
- Succeeded by: Joseph M. Palmer, David Schley, John Sifford, Abdiel Unkefer

Personal details
- Born: January 1790
- Died: June 24, 1874 (aged 84) near Liberty, Maryland, U.S.
- Resting place: Liberty, Maryland, U.S.
- Party: Whig
- Occupation: Politician

Thomas Hammond (January 1790 – June 24, 1874) was an American politician from Maryland.

== Biography ==
Thomas Hammond was born in January 1790. He was a Whig. He served as a member of the Maryland House of Delegates, representing Frederick County, in 1832 and from 1861 to 1864. After the Civil War, he took little interest in politics.

Hammond married and his wife predeceased him.

Hammond died on June 24, 1874, aged 84, at his home near Liberty. He was buried at his home in Liberty.
