= Joshua Biggs =

American politician (1821–1888)

Member of the Maryland Senate from the Frederick County district
- In office 1868–1870
- Preceded by: Charles E. Trail
- Succeeded by: Lewis Henry Steiner

Member of the Maryland House of Delegates from the Frederick County district
- In office 1861–1864 Serving with Hiram Buhrman, James M. Coale, Thomas Hammond, Henry R. Harris, Thomas Johnson, Upton Buhrman, David Rinehart, Oliver P. Snyder, Charles E. Trail
- Preceded by: Thomas J. Claggett, John A. Johnson, Andrew Kessler, David W. Naill, Jonathan Routzahn, William E. Salmon
- Succeeded by: David Agnew, Upton Buhrman, Samuel Keefer, David J. Markey, David Rinehart, Thomas A. Smith

Personal details
- Born: January 1, 1821
- Died: July 9, 1888 (aged 67) Rocky Ridge, Maryland, U.S.
- Resting place: Rocky Ridge, Maryland, U.S.
- Party: Whig; Democratic
- Spouse: Phoebe S. Morrison (m. 1856)
- Children: 4
- Education: Pennsylvania College
- Occupation: Politician; miller; businessman

Joshua Biggs (January 1, 1821 – July 9, 1888) was an American politician and miller from Maryland. He represented Frederick County as a member of the Maryland House of Delegates from 1861 to 1862 and in 1864, and as a member of the Maryland Senate from 1868 to 1870.

== Early life ==
Joshua Biggs was born on January 1, 1821, at the Buck Forest farm, to Sarah (née Haines) and William Biggs. He graduated from Pennsylvania College. He taught school and studied medicine.

== Career ==
Prior to the Civil War, Biggs was a Whig. After the war, he was a Democrat. He was school inspector of Frederick County from 1851 to 1865. He became director of the Western Maryland Railroad Company in 1866. He was also director of the Baltimore County Fire Insurance Company.

Biggs served as a member of the Maryland House of Delegates, representing Frederick County, from 1861 to 1862 and in 1864. He served as a member of the Maryland Senate, representing Frederick County, from 1868 to 1870.

Biggs owned 500 acres (200 ha) of farmland and the Isabella Mills on Owens Creek. Around 1885, he turned over his mill and depot businesses to his sons.

== Personal life ==
Biggs married Phoebe S. Morrison on November 11, 1856. They had four sons, including William and Sheridan. In 1870, he built a residence and depot at Rocky Ridge.

Biggs had cancer in his jaw in March 1887. He died on July 9, 1888, at Rocky Ridge. He was interred in Rocky Ridge.
