= Thomas Maynard =

Thomas Maynard may refer to:

- Thomas Maynard (MP) (c.1686-1742), English member of parliament
- Thomas G. Maynard (1809–1891), American politician from Maryland
- Tom Maynard (1989–2012), Welsh professional cricketer

== See also ==
- Thomas Maynard House, historic home in New London, Maryland, United States
