= David Rinehart =

American politician (died 1903)

Member of the Maryland House of Delegates from the Frederick County district
- In office 1864–1866 Serving with Joshua Biggs, Upton Buhrman, Thomas Hammond, Oliver P. Snyder, Charles E. Trail, David Agnew, Samuel Keefer, David J. Markey, Thomas A. Smith
- Preceded by: Joshua Biggs, Hiram Buhrman, James M. Coale, Thomas Hammond, Henry R. Harris, Thomas Johnson
- Succeeded by: Henry Baker, Upton Buhrman, Thomas Gorsuch, John L. Linthicum, John R. Rouzer, John A. Steiner

Personal details
- Died: January 15, 1903 (aged 85) near Union Bridge, Maryland, U.S.
- Party: Republican
- Children: 2
- Relatives: William Henry Rinehart (brother)
- Occupation: Politician

David Rinehart (died January 15, 1903) was an American politician from Maryland. He served as a member of the Maryland House of Delegates, representing Frederick County from 1864 to 1866.

== Early life ==
David Rinehart was born in Carroll County, Maryland. His brother was sculptor William Henry Rinehart.

== Career ==
Rinehart was associated with a Friends school. He was elected as county commissioner of Frederick County twice. He served as a member of the Maryland House of Delegates, representing Frederick County, from 1864 to 1866. He was elected to the convention for the Maryland Constitution of 1864. While in the legislature, he received the nickname "Honest David Rinehart".

In 1879, he ran as a Republican in Carroll County for the Maryland Senate, but was defeated by Henry Vanderford.

== Personal life ==
Rinehart had two sons, Winfield S. and Lincoln W.

Rinehart died on January 15, 1903, aged 85, at Cottage Home in Frederick County, near Union Bridge.
