= Oliver P. Harding =

American politician (1822–1900)

Member of the Maryland House of Delegates from the Frederick County district
- In office 1858–1860 Serving with Stephen R. Bowlus, Ulysses Hobbs, John A. Koons, Jacob Root, John B. Thomas
- Preceded by: Lawrence J. Brengle, James S. Carper, James L. Davis, Daniel Grove, Peter Hauver, William N. Wolfe
- Succeeded by: Thomas J. Claggett, John A. Johnson, Andrew Kessler, Daniel W. Naill, Jonathan Routzahn, William E. Salmon

Personal details
- Born: August 27, 1822 Frederick County, Maryland, U.S.
- Died: May 22, 1900 (aged 77) Frederick, Maryland, U.S.
- Resting place: near New London, Maryland, U.S.
- Spouse: Belinda Myers (m. 1846)
- Children: 4
- Occupation: Politician; educator; farmer

Oliver P. Harding (August 27, 1822 – May 22, 1900) was an American politician from Maryland. He served as a member of the Maryland House of Delegates, representing Frederick County from 1858 to 1860.

== Early life ==
Oliver P. Harding was born on August 27, 1822, near New London (or New Market), Frederick County, Maryland, to Hannah (née Norris) and John Harding. He was educated at Brook Hill Academy in Montgomery County and worked as a teacher.

== Career ==
Harding served as a member of the Maryland House of Delegates, representing Frederick County from 1858 to 1860. He worked as a farmer on his father's farm until his retirement around 1895.

== Personal life ==
Harding married Belinda Myers in 1846. They had two sons and two daughters, John N., Everest C., Mrs. William C. Huffman and H. N. Around 1895, he moved to Frederick.

Harding died on May 22, 1900, at his home on South Market Street in Frederick. He was buried at a cemetery near New London.
