= John R. Rouzer =

American politician (1839–1914)

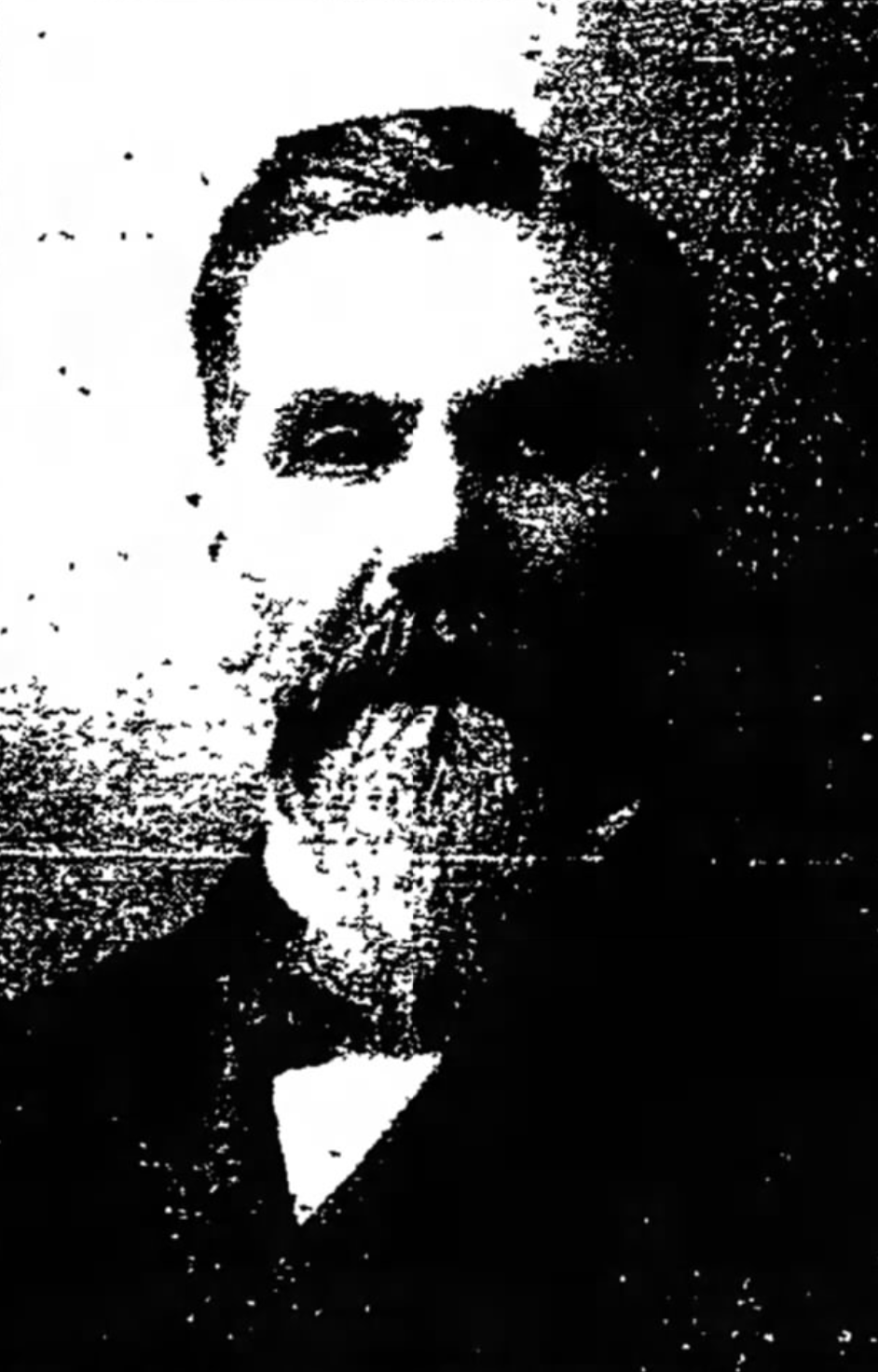
- Rouzer in a 1914 newspaper

Member of the Maryland House of Delegates from the Frederick County district
- In office 1894–1900 Serving with Andrew A. Annan, George W. Crum Jr., James P. Perry, Melvin P. Wood, Charles F. Markell, Job M. Miller, J. Frank Butts, Harry E. Chapline, E. Elmer Harn, Thomas Hightman
- Preceded by: James S. Biggs, Joseph W. Gaver, Manasses J. Grove, James Roger McSherry, Richard F. Sappington
- Succeeded by: Simeon L. Bast, Samuel R. Brown, D. Princeton Buckey, William H. Lakin, Charles C. Waters
- In office 1867–1867 Serving with Henry Baker, Upton Buhrman, Thomas Gorsuch, John L. Linthicum, John A. Steiner
- Preceded by: David Agnew, Upton Buhrman, Samuel Keefer, David J. Markey, David Rinehart, Thomas A. Smith
- Succeeded by: Ephraim Albaugh, Noah Bowlus, Joseph Byers, R. P. T. Dutrow, Thomas G. Maynard, Charles F. Wenner

Personal details
- Born: May 1839 near Thurmont, Maryland, U.S.
- Died: March 25, 1914 (aged 74) Thurmont, Maryland, U.S.
- Resting place: United Brethren Cemetery
- Party: Whig; Republican
- Spouse(s): Harriet E. Wilhide (m. 1866; died 1868) Julia Wilhide Willman (m. 1871)
- Children: 6
- Occupation: Politician; businessman; farmer
- Military career
- Branch: Union Army
- Service years: 1862–1865
- Unit: 6th Regiment Maryland Volunteer Infantry
- Conflicts: American Civil War; Battle of the Wilderness (WIA); Third Battle of Winchester (POW)

John R. Rouzer (May 1839 – March 25, 1914) was an American politician from Maryland. He served as a member of the Maryland House of Delegates, representing Frederick County in 1867 and from 1894 to 1900.

== Early life ==
John R. Rouzer was born, youngest of 10 children, at the family homestead on May 7 (or 9), 1839 near Apples Church and Thurmont, Maryland, to Rachel and Peter Rouzer. His mother died when he was one and he was raised by his sister and her husband Joseph Freeze. He attended public and private schools and the Mechanicstown Academy in Thurmont.

== Career ==
At the age of 18, Rouzer began work. he worked in the shop of his brother-in-law Joseph Freeze. He learned the trade of sadler and harness maker. He later bought out his brother-in-law's shop.

Rouzer enlisted on August 19, 1862, in Company D of the 6th Regiment Maryland Volunteer Infantry as first lieutenant. He later became captain. He was twice brevetted for meritorious service; later in the war being brevetted as a lieutenant colonel. He participated in multiple engagements and was wounded at the Battle of the Wilderness on May 5, 1864. He was brevetted as lieutenant colonel for "valiant service". He was captured during the Third Battle of Winchester on September 19, 1864, and was in Libby Prison, Danville Prison and Salisbury Prison for four months. He was honorably discharged on June 20, 1865.

After the war, Rouzer returned to Thurmont and engaged in business. On March 19, 1869, he was appointed postmaster of Thurmont by postmaster A. J. Creswell. He served in that role until November 1873 or December 1875. He was elected as register of wills of Frederick County and served in that role for six years. Afterward, he retired and engaged in farming. In 1883, he declined appointment as school commissioner of Frederick County. He was commissioner and treasurer of the corporation of Mechanicstown for a number of years. Rouzer was a Whig and later a Republican. He was known in Frederick County as the "grand old man". He served as a member of the Maryland House of Delegates, representing Frederick County in 1867 and from 1894 to 1900. He also served as commissioner of Thurmont and was a school trustee for 40 years. In 1900, he was appointed by President William McKinley as deputy register of wills in Washington, D.C. He served in the role for four years. In 1912, the Republicans wanted to nominate Rouzer for state comptroller, but he declined due to his health.

Rouzer was a charter member and served as president of the Mechanicstown Water Company for a number of years. From around 1910 to January 1, 1914, he was president of the Thurmont National Bank. Due to failing health, he stepped down and served as vice president. He was a charter member of Jason Damuth Post No. 80 Department of Maryland, G.A.R. He was chaplain of the post from 1908 to 1909, commander of the post from 1910 to 1911 and patriotic inspector of the post from 1912 to 1914.

== Personal life ==
Rouzer married Harriet E. Wilhide, daughter of Joseph Wilhide, on May 7, 1866. She died in 1868. They had one child who died at four months old. In 1871, he married Julia Wilhide Willman, widow of E. Willman and sister of his first wife. They had five children, including Mrs. Leister Armacost, Mrs. Harry Brown and Horace C. He was a member of St. John's Lutheran Church, an Evangelical Lutheran Church and was an officer in its Sunday school.

Later in life, Rouzer had poor eyesight and was unable to read starting around 1912. He died on March 25, 1914, at his home in Thurmont. He was buried in the United Brethren Cemetery.
