= John Ross Key =

American judge (1754–1821)

- Born: September 19, 1754; Redland, Maryland, British America
- Died: October 11, 1821 (aged 67)
- Resting place: Mount Olivet Cemetery
- Occupation(s): Lawyer, officer, judge
- Spouse: Ann Phoebe Penn Dagworthy Charlton
- Children: 3, including Francis Scott Key

John Ross Key (September 19, 1754 – October 11, 1821) was a lawyer, a commissioned officer in the Continental Army, a judge, and the father of writer Francis Scott Key.

== Early life ==
Key was born in Redland, Maryland, to Francis Key and his wife Ann (or "Anne") Arnold Ross. Ross Key's grandfather was English settler Philip Key who resided near Leonardtown around 1726, he married Susannah Gardiner and had seven children: Richard Ward Key, Phillip Key, Thomas Key, Francis Key, Edmund Key and Susanna Gardiner Key. His mother Anne Arnold Ross was the daughter of English parents John Ross and Alicia Arnold, who married in St James's Church, Westminster.

Ann was a strong influence on her grandson Francis Scott Key when he lived with her near Annapolis when he was in school there.

== Military, law career ==
Mustered into service at Frederick on June 21, 1775, Key was commissioned as a second lieutenant in Captain Thomas Price's Maryland Rifle Company. It was one of the first military forces from outside New England that came to aid General Washington at the siege of Boston, July–August 1775.

At the end of 1776 Key is serving in the Maryland Militia under his uncle, Colonel Normand Bruce, in the Frederick County, 35th Battalion. From Private Jacob Zoll's pension application there is a firsthand account of Captain John Ross Key and his company going north in early 1777 with the Maryland Militia under Colonel Bruce. Key's company would be involved in a skirmish in Quibbletown, New Jersey in February 1777.

By 1781 Key was a captain. He commanded a Frederick County Company of Cavalry during the Yorktown Campaign.

He was later a justice of the peace, a judge, and associate justice of his judicial district, which comprised Allegany, Washington and Frederick Counties. His brother Philip Barton Key, also an attorney arranged for his nephew Francis to study law under his friend, Judge Jeremiah Townley Chase in 1800 and with whom he would later be a partner in Georgetown. Francis took the practice over entirely when his uncle ran for Congress.

== Personal life ==
He married Ann Phoebe Penn Dagworthy Charlton at the city of Frederick on October 19, 1775. Six children were born to the couple, but only three reached maturity. Francis Scott Key, his sister Anne Arnold Phoebe Charlton Key who would marry Roger Brooke Taney and John Alfred Key who died at Edgefield, South Carolina.

== Death ==
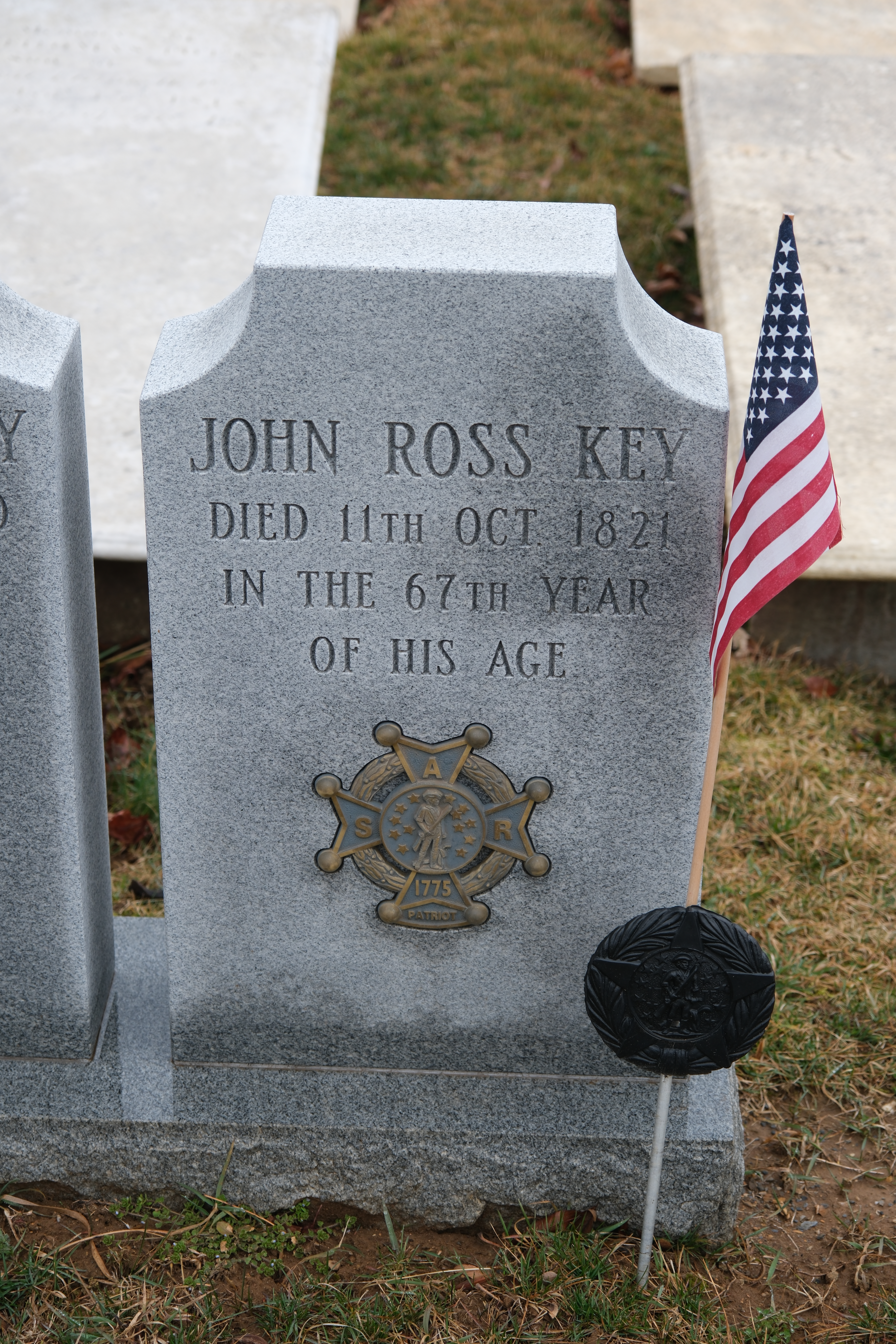
Grave of Key at Mount Olivet Cemetery

Key died at the age of 67 in Frederick City and was interred there at Mount Olivet Cemetery.
