= William E. Salmon =

American politician (died 1883)

Member of the Maryland House of Delegates from the Frederick County district
- In office 1860–1861 Serving with Thomas J. Claggett, John A. Johnson, Andrew Kessler, David W. Naill, Jonathan Routzahn
- Preceded by: Stephen R. Bowlus, Oliver P. Harding, Ulysses Hobbs, John A. Koons, Jacob Root, John B. Thomas
- Succeeded by: Joshua Biggs, Hiram Buhrman, James M. Coale, Thomas Hammond, Henry R. Harris, Thomas Johnson
- In office 1854–1854 Serving with William T. Gittings, James J. Johnson, Lewis M. Motter, William C. Sappington, David Thomas
- Preceded by: William P. Anderson, James M. Coale, George W. Ent, James M. Geyer, John Lee, Davis Richardson
- Succeeded by: Lawrence J. Brengle, James S. Carper, James L. Davis, Daniel Grove, Peter Hauver, William N. Wolfe

Personal details
- Died: April 16, 1883 near New Market, Maryland, U.S.
- Occupation: Politician

William E. Salmon (died April 16, 1883) was an American politician from Maryland. He served as a member of the Maryland House of Delegates, representing Frederick County in 1854 and from 1860 to 1861.

== Biography ==
William E. Salmon was a member of the Maryland House of Delegates, representing Frederick County in 1854 and from 1860 to 1861. After the outbreak of the Civil War, on September 17 or 18, 1861, he was arrested with other lawmakers. He was imprisoned in Fort Lafayette and Fort Warren.

Salmon died on April 16, 1883, at his home near New Market, Maryland.
