= Mount Olivet Cemetery (Frederick, Maryland) =

Maryland cemetery

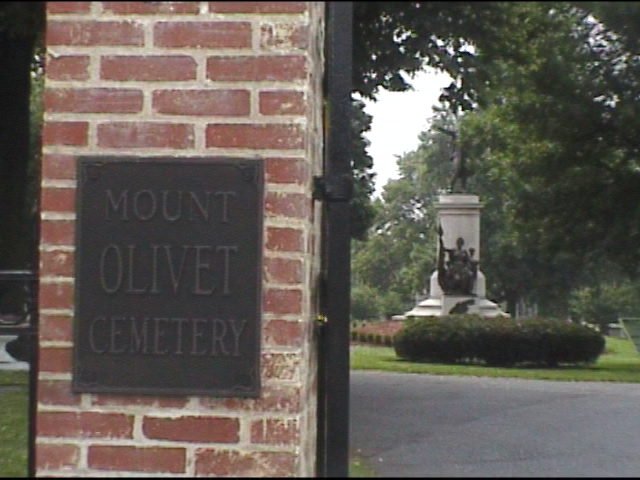
- The gate of Mount Olivet Cemetery with the Francis Scott Key Monument in the distance
- Interactive map of Mount Olivet Cemetery

Details
- Established: 1854 (chartered)
- Location: 515 South Market Street, Frederick, Maryland
- Country: United States
- Coordinates: 39°24′18.54″N 77°24′52.03″W
- Owned by: Mount Olivet Cemetery Company, Inc.
- No. of graves: 40,000+
- Website: mountolivetcemeteryinc.com
- Find a Grave: Mount Olivet Cemetery

Mount Olivet Cemetery is a cemetery in Frederick, Maryland. The cemetery is located at 515 South Market Street and is operated by the Mount Olivet Cemetery Company, Inc.

== History ==
On October 4, 1852, a group of Maryland citizens, including then-lawyer Charles Edward Trail, founded the Mount Olivet Cemetery Company. The company purchased 32 acres of land, which was designed by James Belden to incorporate walkways and driveways throughout the grounds. The cemetery was conceived primarily to provide several of the downtown Frederick churches more room for interments, after their cemeteries became full. Over time some of these smaller cemeteries were also relocated to Mount Olivet. One of the landmarks of Frederick, the Episcopal graveyard, a family burying ground of some of the most famous personages of Maryland, was sold for commercial purposes. All bodies were moved from the graveyard to Mt. Olivet Cemetery.

Initial shares were sold for US$20, with the intention that after the cemetery was laid out, each share would be exchanged for 12 grave lots. The cemetery was formally established (chartered) in 1854. Mrs. Ann Crawford was the first person buried in the cemetery, on May 28, 1854.

== Notable monuments and markers ==
Mount Olivet Cemetery has had many monuments constructed on the grounds since its establishment. These monuments honor significant historical people, events and the men and women who fought in many of the military conflicts the United States has been involved in.

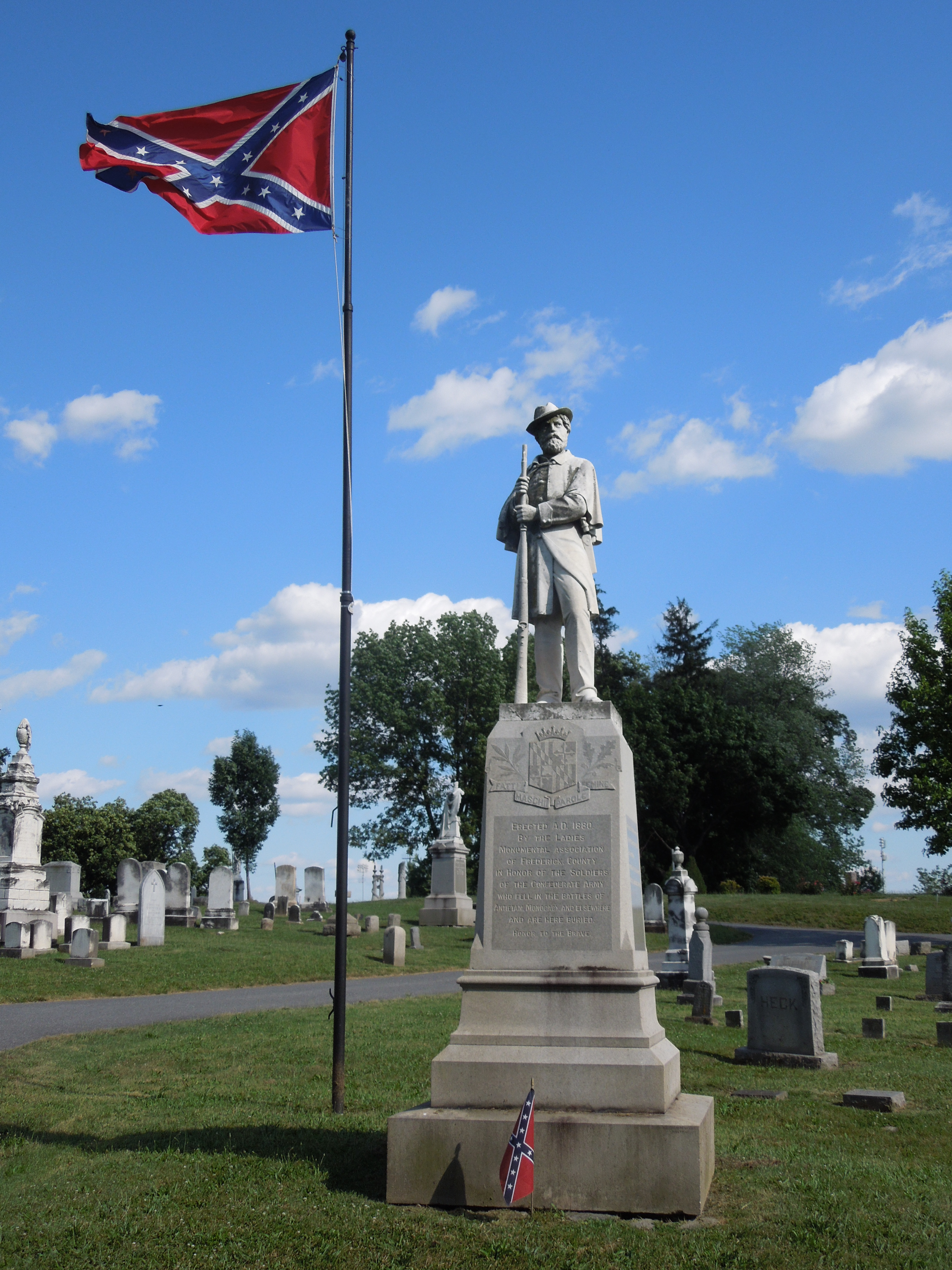
Monument to the Unknown Confederate Soldiers.

=== Monument to the Unknown Confederate Soldiers ===
On August 7, 1879, a meeting was held to organize a group called the Ladies Monumental Association of Frederick County, whose purpose it was to raise the funds needed to erect a monument to the 408 ‘unknown’ deceased Confederate soldiers interred at Mount Olivet Cemetery. The monument was unveiled on June 2, 1881, to honor the soldiers of the Confederate army who fell in battles of the Civil War and who are buried at Mount Olivet Cemetery. The monument was 15 feet tall. The statue of the Confederate soldier was created in Italy of Carrara marble and stood upon a base made of granite. The inscriptions read as follows:

Front panel:”Erected A.D. 1880, by the Ladies’ Monumental Association of Frederick County, in honor of the soldiers of the Confederate army who fell in the battles of Antietam and Monocacy and elsewhere, and who are buried here.”

Right panel: ”Soldiers rest, thy warfare o’er, Sleep the sleep that knows not breaking, Dream of battle-fields no more, Days of danger, nights of waking.”

Left panel: ”To the unknown soldiers whose bodies here rest. We cannot inscribe their names upon tablets of stone, but we may hope to read them in a purer and unchangeable record.”

Rear panel: ”Their praises will be sung In some yet unmolded tongue, Far on in summers that we shall not see.”

The statue was toppled, beheaded and splattered in red paint in June 2020. At the time caretakers said it was unlikely they'd be able to repair it. A week earlier, the cemetery had removed the Confederate flag that flew next to it.

=== United States Civil War Children’s Memorial ===
Children played a large role in the civil war as soldiers, drummers, scouts and nurses among other things. It has been estimated that 5% of the soldiers who fought in the Civil War were under the age of 18. This marker, erected in 1881, is "dedicated to the memory of the children who served and died in the civil war 1861-1865".

=== Francis Scott Key Memorial Monument ===
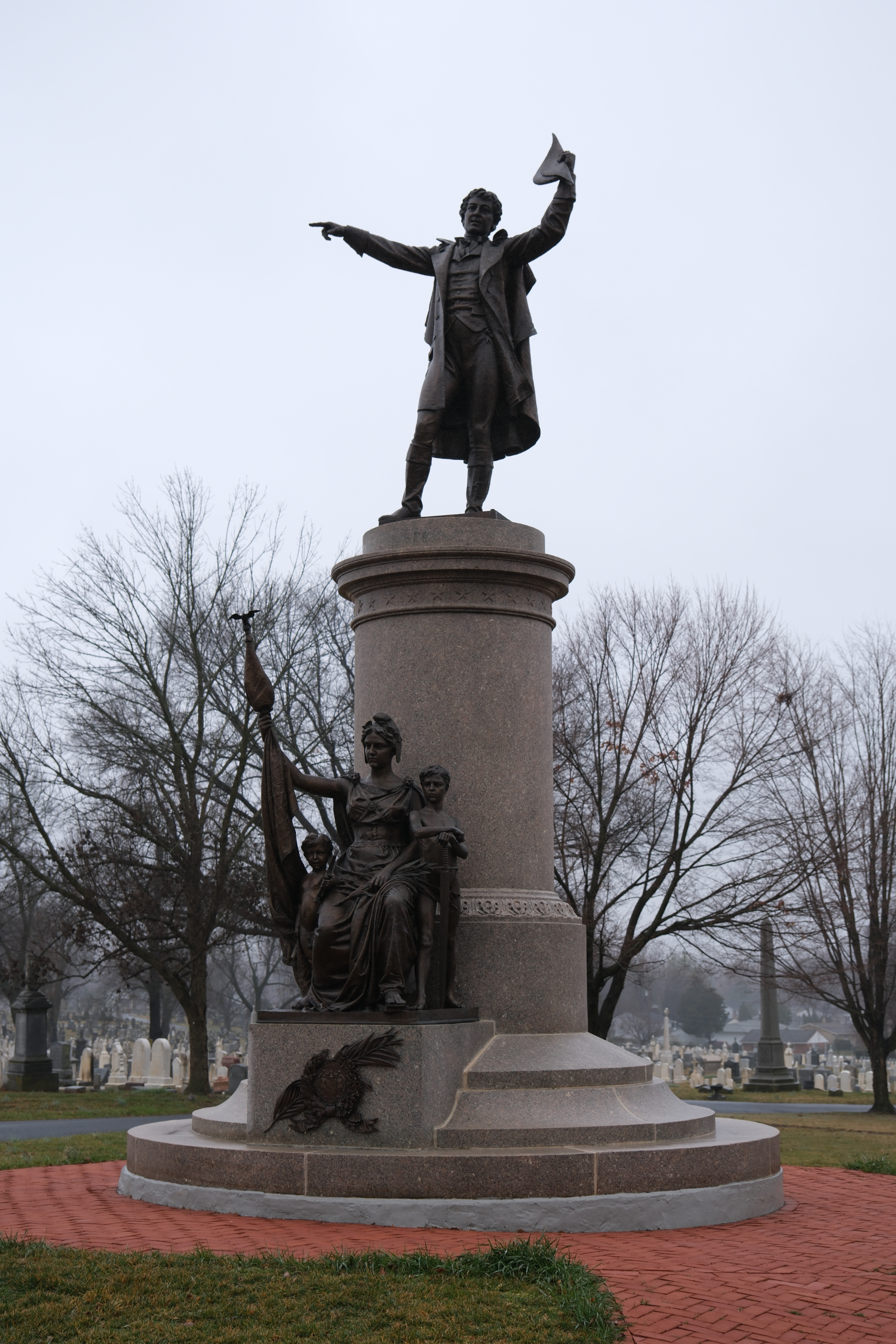
The 1898 monument to Francis Scott Key below which he and his wife are interred.

The Francis Scott Key Memorial Association commissioned the American sculptor Alexander Doyle to create a monument suitable for the author of the national anthem of the United States. On August 9, 1898, Julia McHenry Howard unveiled the monument of her grandfather and author of the "Star Spangled Banner", Francis Scott Key. Key and his wife, Mary Taylor Key, were relocated from the Key family plot, also at Mount Olivet Cemetery, to a crypt located in the foundation of the monument. Key is represented in a 9-foot bronze statue atop a 15-foot pedestal. A statue of Columbia, the goddess of patriotism, is located on the front of the pedestal. Columbia is flanked by an adolescent boy representing war on her left, and a young boy representing music on her right. This representation depicts the moment that inspired the poem "Defence of Fort McHenry" which he wrote after witnessing the bombardment of Fort McHenry by the British Royal Navy ships in Chesapeake Bay during the Battle of Fort McHenry in the War of 1812. The poem would eventually be set to the tune of "To Anacreon in Heaven" and become the national anthem of the United States.

=== Barbara Fritchie Memorial ===
Erected by the Barbara Fritchie Memorial Association in September 1914, it was unveiled as part of the ceremonies of the Star Spangled Banner Centenary. The monument is a large granite obelisk bearing a tablet containing John Greenleaf Whittier's 1863 poem "Barbara Fritchie". Above the tablet is a medallion created by the New York City sculptor James E. Kelly that depicts Fritchie's profile, executed from an old time photograph, in front of a waving American flag. Fritchie, the subject of John Greenleaf Whittier’s poem, patriotically defied Stonewall Jackson and his Confederate Army as they marched past her Frederick home on September 10, 1862. The poem was very popular in the north but she would never know the notoriety she had achieved, because she had died a year earlier at the age of 96.

==== Other notable monuments ====
- Frederick County Confederates Tablet – erected 1933, defaced in 2020.
- Frederick County World War II Memorial – erected 1947
- Veterans Monument
- Fire Fighters Memorial – erected in the memory of the fallen firefighters of Frederick County.
- Fire and Rescue Memorial – dedicated to the deceased members of the Frederick County Fire and Rescue services.

== Notable interments ==
- George Baer Jr., (1763–1834), U.S. Congressman for Maryland's 4th District, 1797–1801 and 1815–1817.
- Henry Baker (died 1896), member of the Maryland House of Delegates
- Francis Brengle (1807–1846), a member of the Maryland House of Delegates in 1832, 1834, and 1836, and was elected as a Whig to the Twenty-eighth United States Congress, serving from March 4, 1843, to March 3, 1845.
- James C. Clarke (1823–1902), railroad executive, Maryland state delegate and state senator
- Henry A. Cole (1838–1909), Union colonel in the Civil War
- James Cooper (1810–1863), U.S. Congressman and Senator from Pennsylvania, Union Army general.
- Julien P. Delphey (1917–2009), member of the Maryland House of Delegates
- Robert L. Downing (1857–1944), American Shakespearean stage actor and later preacher
- R. P. T. Dutrow (1828–1877), member of the Maryland House of Delegates
- Barbara Fritchie (1766–1862), American patriot during the Civil War and the subject of John Greenleaf Whittier's 1864 poem, Barbara Frietchie.
- John B. Funk (1905–1993), member of the Maryland House of Delegates and Maryland Senate, Secretary of State of Maryland
- Thomas Gorsuch (died 1896), member of the Maryland House of Delegates
- Peter L. Hargett (1852–1957), member of the Maryland House of Delegates
- Samuel Hinks (1815–1887), Mayor of Baltimore
- Ulysses Hobbs (1832–1911), member of the Maryland House of Delegates
- Thomas Johnson (1732–1819), the first Governor of Maryland, a delegate to the Continental Congress and an Associate Justice of the Supreme Court of the United States.^{,}
- Francis Scott Key (1779–1843), author of "The Star-Spangled Banner" the national anthem of the United States. Members of the Key family are interred in the Key family plot in the cemetery.
- John Ross Key (1754–1821) commissioned officer in the Continental Army, judge, lawyer and the father of Francis Scott Key.
- Jacob Michael Kunkel (1822–1870), served in the Maryland State Senate from 1850–1856 and was elected as a Democrat to the Thirty-fifth and Thirty-sixth Congresses (1857–1861).
- Charles McCurdy "Mac" Mathias Jr. (1922–2010), served in the US Navy and became a Captain in the Navy Reserve, was Frederick's city Attorney (1954–1959), member of the Maryland House of Delegates (1959–1960), Represented Maryland's 6th district in the United States House of Representatives (1961–1969) and was a United States senator (1969–1987).
- William P. Maulsby (1815–1894), lawyer, judge, member of the Maryland Senate
- A. LeRoy McCardell (1873–1945), state senator
- Claire McCardell (1905–1958), fashion designer known for sportswear
- Emily Nelson Ritchie McLean (1859–1916), 7th President-General of the Daughters of the American Revolution
- J. Frank Morrison (1841–1916), electric company pioneer and Baltimore politicial boss
- Roger Nelson (1759–1815), was an American politician who represented the fourth district of Maryland in the United States House of Representatives from 1804 to 1810.
- John D. Nicodemus (1864–1934), member of the Maryland House of Delegates
- Richard Potts (1753–1808), U.S. senator and judge
- John Ritchie (1831–1887), Civil War Brevet Brigadier General and United States Congressman (1871–1873).
- J. Alfred Ritter (died 1892), member of the Maryland House of Delegates
- James M. Schley (died 1883), member of the Maryland House of Delegates
- John A. Steiner (1816–1902), member of the Maryland House of Delegates
- John B. Thomas (1819–1893), member of the Maryland House of Delegates
- Charles Edward Trail (1826–1909), Maryland delegate and senator
- Florence Trail (1854–1944), educator and author
- Milton George Urner (1839–1926), was a United States Congressman from the sixth district of Maryland (1879–1883).
- Gary L. Utterback (1889–1962), member of the Maryland House of Delegates
- Charlotte Louise Berry Winters (1897–2007), the last surviving female American veteran of the First World War.
- Thomas Contee Worthington (1782–1847), served as a captain in the War of 1812 and was a United States representative from Maryland. The nephew of Benjamin Contee.

== See also ==
- List of burial places of justices of the Supreme Court of the United States
- List of cemeteries in the United States
