= 1946 United States Senate election in Maryland =

- November 5, 1946
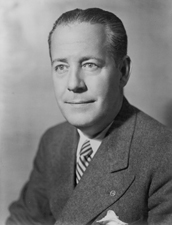

Nominee	Herbert O'Conor	D. John Markey
Party	Democratic	Republican
Popular vote	237,232	235,000
Percentage	50.24%	49.76%
- County results O'Conor: 50–60% Markey: 50–60% 60–70%
U.S. senator before election
George L. P. Radcliffe
Democratic
Elected U.S. Senator
Herbert O'Conor
Democratic

The 1946 United States Senate election in Maryland was held on November 5, 1946.

Incumbent Democratic Senator George L. P. Radcliffe ran for a third consecutive term in office, but lost the Democratic primary to Governor of Maryland Herbert O'Conor. O'Conor narrowly defeated Republican D. John Markey to win the open seat.

O'Conor's general election victory and the subsequent recount by a federal Senate Subcommittee were controversial, with each party claiming partisan manipulation by the other.

== Democratic primary ==
=== Candidates ===
- John Emerson LaVeck
- Herbert O'Conor, Governor of Maryland
- George L. P. Radcliffe, incumbent Senator since 1935

=== Results ===
1946 Democratic U.S. Senate primary
Party	Candidate	Votes	%
Democratic	Herbert O'Conor	118,695	52.89%
Democratic	George L. P. Radcliffe (inc.)	96,051	42.80%
Democratic	John Emerson LaVeck	9,670	4.31%
Total votes		224,416	100.00%

== Republican primary ==
=== Candidates ===
- D. John Markey, businessman, U.S. Army veteran, and former Maryland Agricultural College football coach
- Roscoe F. Walter
- Joseph Allison Wilmer

=== Results ===
1946 Republican U.S. Senate primary
Party	Candidate	Votes	%
Republican	D. John Markey	26,366	50.66%
Republican	Joseph Allison Wilmer	19,087	36.67%
Republican	Roscoe F. Walter	6,596	12.67%
Total votes		52,049	100.00%

== General election ==
=== Results ===
1946 U.S. Senate election in Maryland
Party	Candidate	Votes	%	±%
Democratic	Herbert O'Conor	237,232	50.24%	▼14.50
Republican	D. John Markey	235,000	49.76%	▲16.28
Total votes		472,232	100.00%	
Democratic hold				

=== Results by county ===
County	Herbert O'Conor Democratic		D. John Markey Republican		Margin		Total Votes Cast
County	#	%	#	%	#	%	Total Votes Cast
Allegany	9747	45.89%	11495	54.11%	-1748	-8.23%	21242
Anne Arundel	8103	44.43%	10135	55.57%	-2032	-11.14%	18238
Baltimore (City)	101793	53.24%	89408	46.76%	12385	6.48%	191201
Baltimore (County)	20400	45.98%	23970	54.02%	-3570	-8.05%	44370
Calvert	1882	50.12%	1873	49.88%	9	0.24%	3755
Caroline	2578	53.07%	2280	46.93%	298	6.13%	4858
Carroll	4329	41.10%	6204	58.90%	-1875	-17.80%	10533
Cecil	3889	53.09%	3436	46.91%	453	6.18%	7325
Charles	1881	44.11%	2383	55.89%	-502	-11.77%	4264
Dorchester	3137	41.15%	4487	58.85%	-1350	-17.71%	7624
Frederick	6999	43.77%	8992	56.23%	-1993	-12.46%	15991
Garrett	2085	38.40%	3344	61.60%	-1259	-23.19%	5429
Harford	4808	49.13%	4978	50.87%	-170	-1.74%	9786
Howard	3170	53.58%	2746	46.42%	424	7.17%	5916
Kent	2564	53.84%	2198	46.16%	366	7.69%	4762
Montgomery	15874	51.32%	15059	48.68%	815	2.63%	30933
Prince George's	11592	55.60%	9256	44.40%	2336	11.20%	20848
Queen Anne's	2241	54.53%	1869	45.47%	372	9.05%	4110
St. Mary's	2439	53.36%	2132	46.64%	307	6.72%	4571
Somerset	2404	39.74%	3646	60.26%	-1242	-20.53%	6050
Talbot	2357	43.56%	3054	56.44%	-697	-12.88%	5411
Washington	8797	47.72%	9638	52.28%	-841	-4.56%	18435
Wicomico	4319	54.99%	3535	45.01%	784	9.98%	7854
Worcester	2388	53.88%	2044	46.12%	344	7.76%	4432
Total	229776	50.18%	228162	49.82%	1614	0.35%	457938

==== Counties that flipped from Democratic to Republican ====
- Allegany
- Anne Arundel
- Baltimore (County)
- Carroll
- Frederick
- Somerset
- Talbot
- Washington

==== Counties that flipped from Republican to Democratic ====
- Cecil
- Harford
- St. Mary's

=== Aftermath ===
After the vote, both candidates claimed victory, before the official count declared O'Conor the winner by a margin of 2,232 out of more than 470,000 votes cast. On December 10, 1946, Markey requested the U.S. Senate Special Committee to Investigate Senatorial Campaign Expenditures (now controlled by Republicans after their landslide victories in the 1946 elections) conduct a recount in Baltimore City and Montgomery County, which had used electronic voting machines. He also alleged the O'Conor campaign had committed financing violations. The committee agreed because Maryland was unable to conduct its own official recount and found a variation of about 400 votes. The committee then sought to survey five additional counties that were likely to have irregularities. Markey requested a full recount of the entire state.

In the meantime, after a slight delay, O'Conor was sworn into the Senate seat on January 4, 1947. Throughout the recounts, Markey implored the process to be done quickly and implied that the election evidence could go missing at any moment. In May 1947, upon completing the recount of the five additional counties, O'Conor maintained a margin of 1,465 votes. In the aftermath, Markey complained of the O'Conor administration's control of the state government, the Democratic Party's control of the state since 1864, and law enforcement's failure to prevent polling abuses. By contrast, Democratic Maryland senator Millard Tydings alleged partisan bias on the part of the Republican-led investigating subcommittee. The committee completed its full recount of the state in January 1948 and concluded that O'Conor had secured a 1,624-vote majority.

== See also ==
- 1946 United States Senate elections
- 1946 United States elections
