= Chesapeake and Ohio Canal Commemorative Obelisk =

Coordinates: 38°54′16″N 77°03′46″W

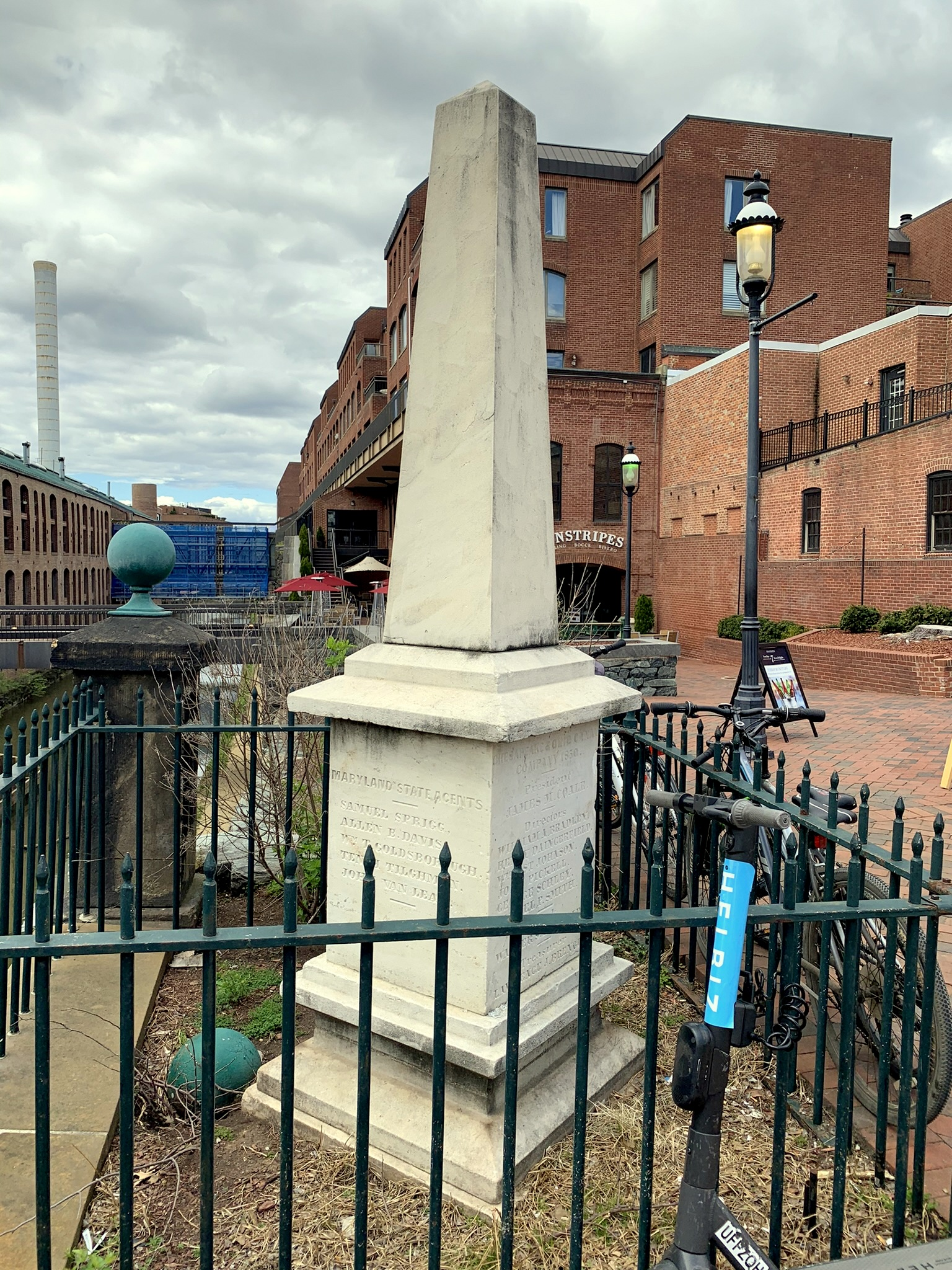
- C&O Canal commemorative obelisk in 2022
- Interactive map of Chesapeake and Ohio Canal Commemorative Obelisk
- Location: Washington, D.C.
- Type: Obelisk
- Material: Marble
- Height: 8 foot
- Opening date: 1850
- Restored date: 2005
- Dedicated to: Completion of the Chesapeake and Ohio Canal to Cumberland, Maryland

The Chesapeake and Ohio Canal Commemorative Obelisk is an 8-foot (2.4 m) marble obelisk erected in 1850 in Washington, D.C., to mark the completion of the Chesapeake and Ohio Canal to Cumberland, Maryland. It stands on the northwest corner of the Wisconsin Avenue Bridge over the canal in Washington's Georgetown neighborhood.

== Description ==
While obelisks traditionally commemorated military victories and wartime heroes, this monument, in contrast, was erected to honor an industrial milestone: the completion of a vital inland transportation network.

Engraved on the monument were the date of completion as well as the names of the president, officers, state agents, and directors. The monument is inscribed on all four sides with each side commemorating an aspect of what helped bring the canal to fruition.

The northeast side marks when the construction on the canal first started in Georgetown on July 4, 1828. It honors chief engineer Benjamin Wright, who in regard to the canal in less then a year contracted around 6,000 men and 700 horses to help build the canal. The inscription reads as follows:

CHESAPEAKE & OHIO CANAL.

Commenced at Georgetown.

July 4TH 1828.

Chief Engineer

BENJAMIN WRIGHT.

The northwest side marks the completion of the waterway out of Cumberland on October 10, 1850, giving credit to chief engineer Charles B. Fisk, who worked on renovating the canal with his most notable project being renovating the canal in Potomac Valley. The inscription reads as follows:

CHESAPEAKE & OHIO CANAL.

COMPLETED TO CUMBERLAND.

OCTR. 10TH 1850

CHIEF ENGINEER

CHARLES B. FISK.

The southeast side focuses on the corporate leadership of the Chesapeake and Ohio Canal Company at the time of when things wrapped up in 1850. It lists the company president James M. Coale along with the directors, the clerk, and the treasurer at the time. the inscription reads as follows:

CHESAPEAKE & OHIO CANAL COMPANY 1850

President: JAMES M. COALE

Directors: WILLIAM A BRADLEY, HENRY DAINGERFIELD, WM. COST JOHNSON, JOHN PICKELL, GEORGE SCHLEY, SAMUEL P. SMITH

Clerk: WALTER S. RINGGOLD

Treasurer: LAWRENCE J. BRENGLE

The southwest side recognizes the state's role in this project by listing the Maryland state agents, pointing to Maryland's huge financial backing to keep the construction for the canal alive through loans and stocks. the inscription reads as follows:

MARYLAND STATE AGENTS.

SAMUEL SPRIGG, ALLEN B. DAVIS, WM. T. GOLDSBOROUGH, TENCH TILGHMAN, JOHN VAN LEAR.

== History ==
This monument, located in Washington, D.C., was erected on November 27, 1850, to mark the successful extension of the Chesapeake and Ohio Canal all the way to Cumberland, Maryland.

The obelisk originally placed along the C&O Canal in Georgetown (the exact historic location remains unknown), the monument later disappeared from public view until 1900, when it was unexpectedly found stored in the basement of the local Hill Mill (for reasons undocumented). That same year, the obelisk was recovered and relocated to street level at the northwest corner of the Wisconsin Avenue Bridge, where it still remains today.

The obelisk was restored in 2005.
