= Peter L. Hargett =

American politician (1852–)

Peter Lilburn Hargett
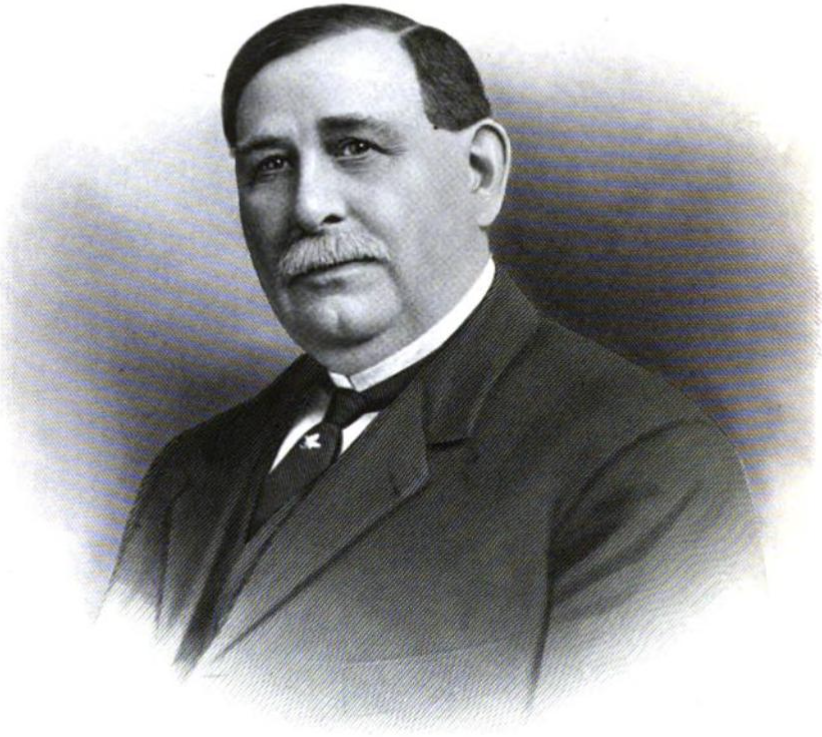

Member of the Maryland House of Delegates
- In office 1910–1914

Personal details
- Born: December 12, 1852 Frederick County, Maryland, U.S.
- Died: June 5, 1927 (aged 74)
- Resting place: Mount Olivet Cemetery; Frederick, Maryland, U.S.
- Party: Republican
- Occupation: Politician; businessman
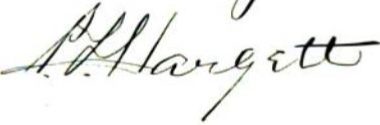
- Signature

Peter Lilburn Hargett (December 12, 1852 – June 5, 1927) was an American politician and businessman. He served in the Maryland House of Delegates from 1910 to 1914.

== Early life ==
Peter Lilburn Hargett was born on December 12, 1852, on a farm known as "Castle Henry" in Frederick County, Maryland to Eleanor (née Burns) and Samuel Hargett. Hargett's great-great-grandfather, Peter Hargett, sailed from Rotterdam and was one of the early German settlers in Frederick County. Hargett attended public schools and Frederick College.

== Career ==
In 1877, Hargett started a hardware firm with his three brothers called P. L. Hargett and Company. The silo they built received the first place award at Jamestown Exposition. In 1903, Hargett and his brother, Douglass H. Hargett, started the Economy Silo and Tank Company. He became the treasurer and manager of the company. After his brother died in 1908, the business was reorganized as The Economy Silo and Manufacturing Company with Hargett as president and manager. Hargett was president of the Jefferson and Frederick Turnpike Road Company, which was purchased in August 1910 by the state as part of the Good Roads Movement. He was treasurer of the Berlin and Lovettsville Bridge Company, treasurer of the Hygeia Ice Company and director of the Citizens National Bank. He was also president and director of Frederick County Agricultural Society.

Hargett was a Republican. He was elected to the Maryland House of Delegates, representing Frederick County, from 1910 to 1914.

== Personal life ==
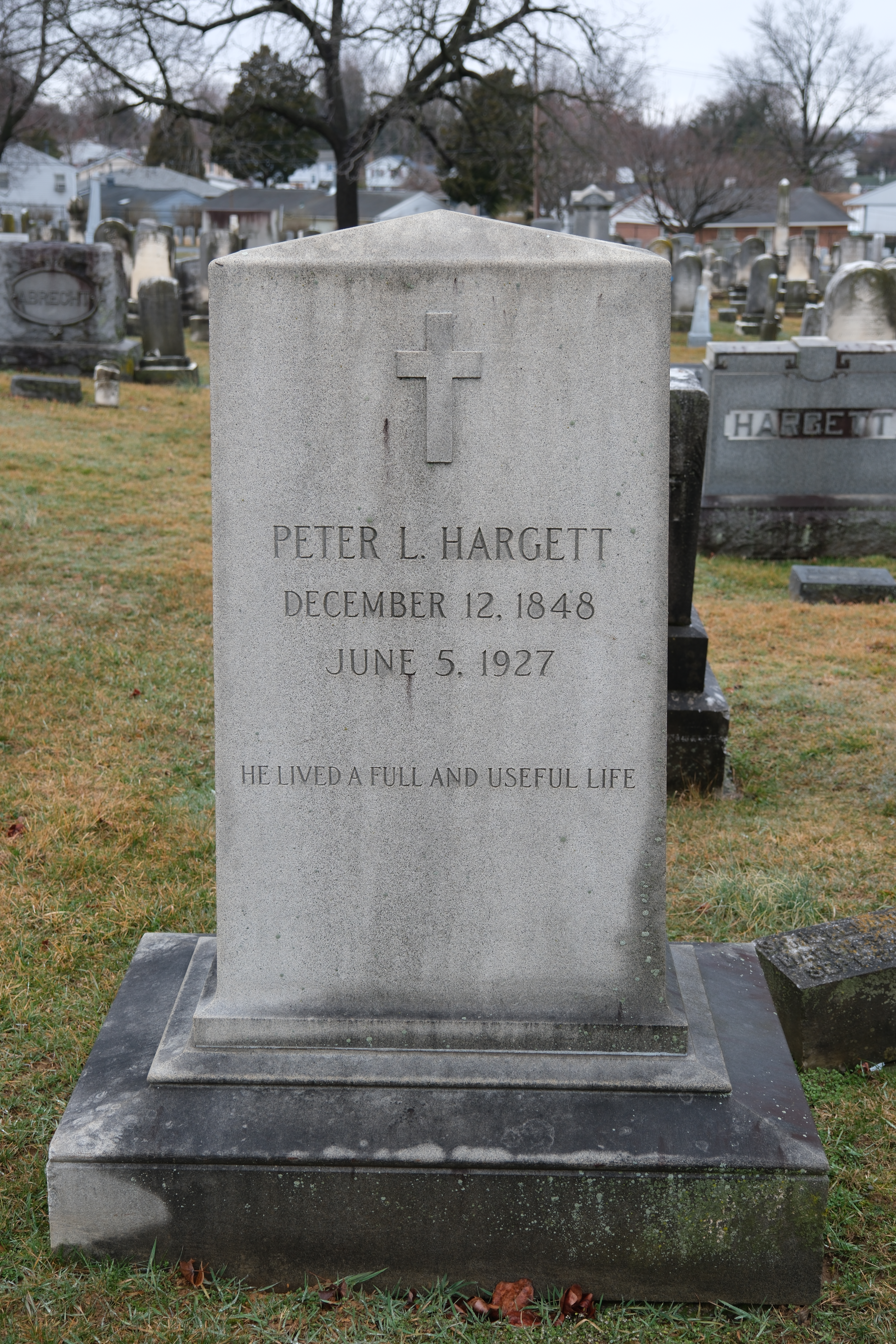
Grave of Hargett at Mount Olivet Cemetery

Hargett did not marry. Hargett died on June 5, 1927. He was buried at Mount Olivet Cemetery in Frederick.
