= Florence Trail =

American educator and author (1854–1944)

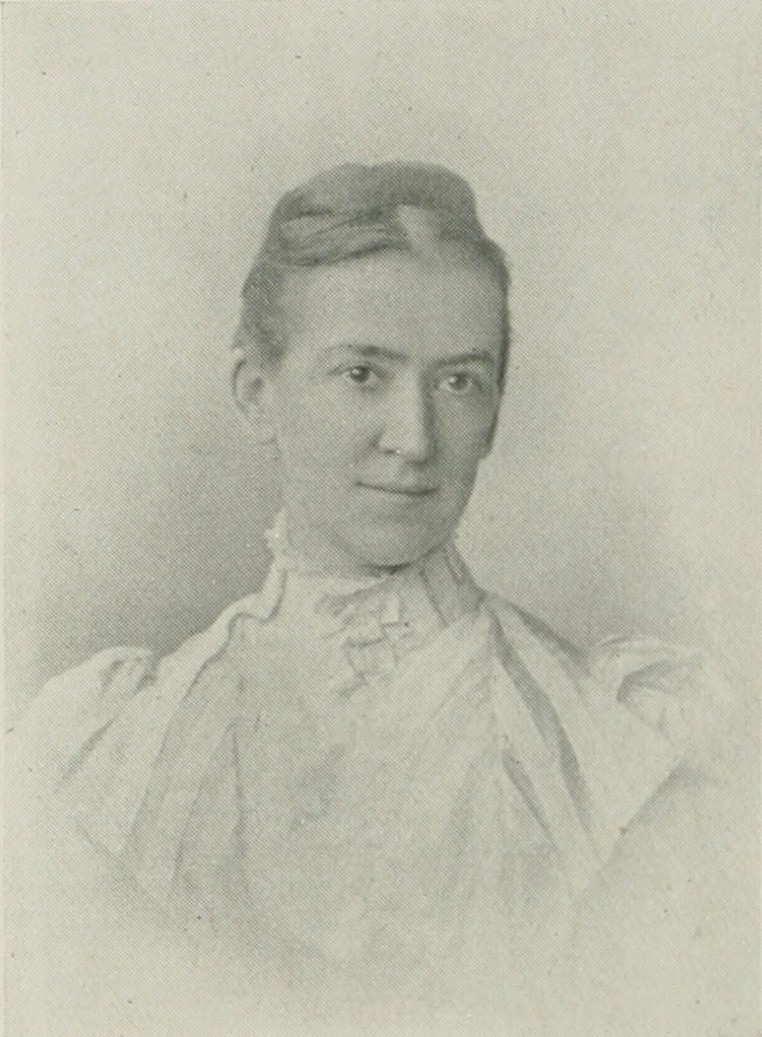
- Photo in A Woman of the Century
- Born: September 1, 1854; Frederick, Maryland, U.S.
- Died: April 21, 1944 (aged 89)
- Resting place: Mount Olivet Cemetery; Frederick, Maryland, U.S.
- Education: Frederick Female Seminary, Mt. Vernon Institute
- Occupations: Teacher; author
- Relatives: Charles Edward Trail (father)
- Writing career
- Notable work: My Journal in Foreign Lands

Florence Trail (September 1, 1854 - April 21, 1944) was an American educator and author. Though she belonged to one of the wealthiest families of Maryland, she believed in the doctrine of self-support and left home to engage in teaching, first in Kentucky and North Carolina, and afterward in New York and Connecticut. On returning from an extended tour of Europe, she published My Journal in Foreign Lands (New York, 1885). This was followed by other volumes, among them: Studies in Criticism (New York, 1888), Under the Second Renaissance (Buffalo, 1894), and A History of Italian Literature.

== Early life and education ==
Florence Trail was born in Frederick, Maryland, September 1, 1854. She was the second daughter of Charles Edward Trail and Ariana McElfresh. Her siblings included, Anna M. Harding, Henry Trail, Bertha Trail, and Charles Bayard Trail. A severe illness at 10 years of age left her with impaired hearing. Her quickness of perception and efforts to divine what others meant to say caused them to forget, or not to realize, that her hearing was not equal to their own. She graduated first in her class in the Frederick Female Seminary, in 1872, having studied mental and moral philosophy, evidences of Christianity, modern history, mythology, rhetoric and composition. The following year, she graduated with highest honors from Mt. Vernon Institute, Baltimore.

== Career ==
After teaching for four years at the Frederick Female Seminary, she left home for a position in Daughters College, Harrodsburg, Kentucky, where she afterwards taught Latin, French, art and music. In Harrodsburg, as well as in Tarboro, North Carolina, where she taught music in 1887 and 1888, and in Miss Hogarth's school, Goshen, New York, where she acted as substitute for some weeks in January, 1890, she made many devoted friends and did superior work as a teacher.

In 1883, she visited Europe, and afterwards published an account of her travels under the title My Journal in Foreign Lands (New York, 1885), which passed through two editions and served as a guide-book. Trail has been a member of the Society to Encourage Studies at Home for 14 years, five as a student of modern history, French literature, Shakespeare and art, and nine as a teacher of ancient history. Her essay on "Prehistoric Greece as we find it in the Poems of Homer " was read before that society at the annual reunion at Miss Ticknor's, in Boston, Massachusetts, in June, 1883.

Trail was an accomplished musician, having studied music in the seminary in Frederick, in the Peabody Conservatory in Baltimore, and in Chickering Hall, New York. She often appeared in concerts with success. Though gifted in many ways, she was best known as a writer. Her best work was, "Studies in Criticism" (New York, 1888). She published over 100 articles in prose and verse, many without signature, in newspapers and magazines. Inheriting a taste for the languages, she was a fine translator and read German, Italian, Latin and French.

== Death ==
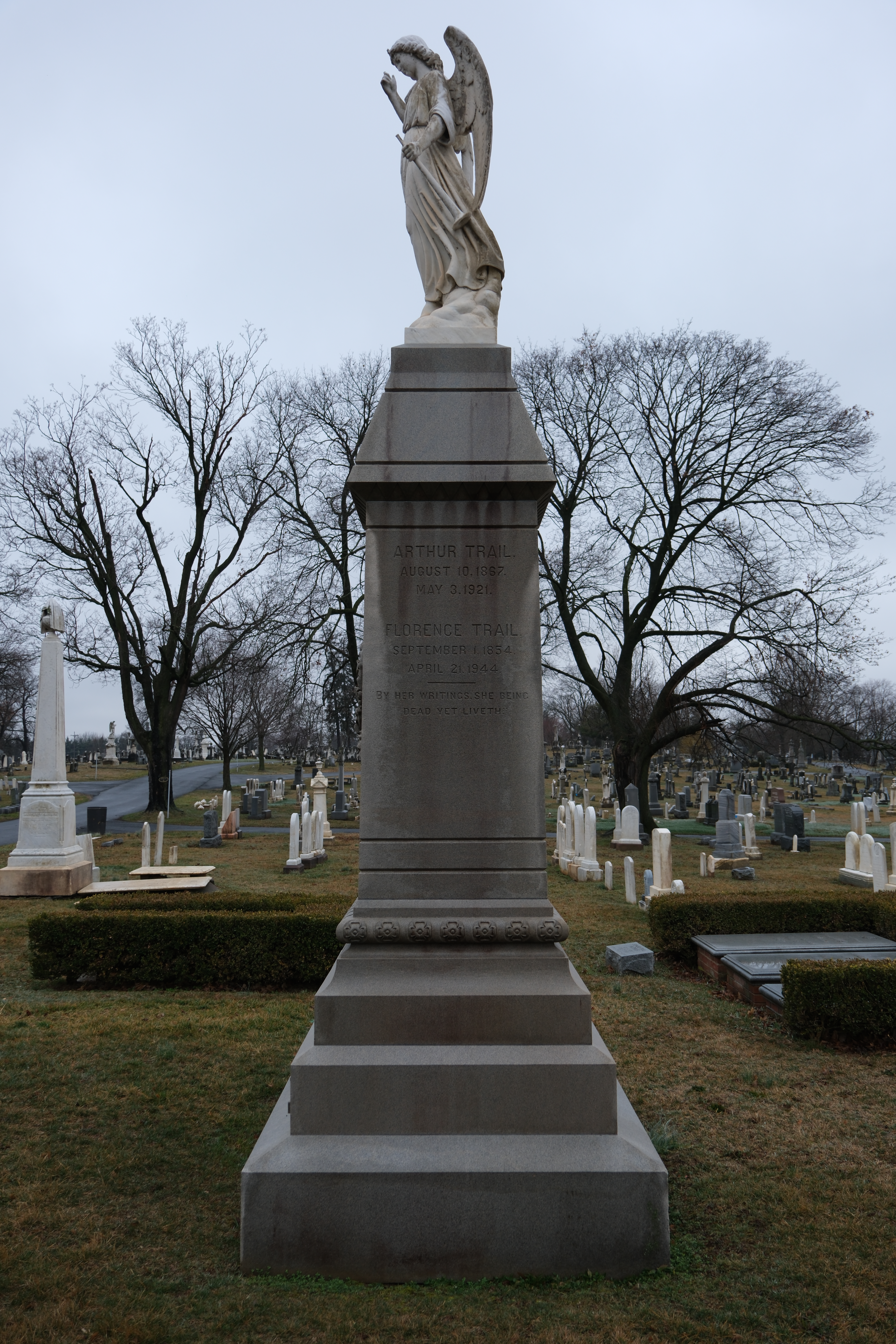
Grave of Trail at Mount Olivet Cemetery

She died April 21, 1944. She was buried at Mount Olivet Cemetery in Frederick.

== Selected works ==
- My journal in foreign lands, 1884
- Studies in criticism, 1888
- Under the second renaissance : a novel, 1894
- A history of Italian literature, Vol. I., 1903
- A history of Italian literature, Vol. II., 1904
- History and democracy; essays in interpretation, 1916
- Meanings of music, 1918
- The scholar's Italy, 1923
- An Italian anthology, 1926
- A memorial of Ariana McElfresh Trail, 1929
- Modern Italian culture, 1931
- Diary of Florence Trail, 1892
- Foreign family life in France in 1891, 1944
