= Andrew Kessler =

American politician (died 1896)

Member of the Maryland House of Delegates from the Frederick County district
- In office 1860–1861 Serving with Thomas J. Claggett, John A. Johnson, William E. Salmon, David W. Naill, Jonathan Routzahn
- Preceded by: Stephen R. Bowlus, Oliver P. Harding, Ulysses Hobbs, John A. Koons, Jacob Root, John B. Thomas
- Succeeded by: Joshua Biggs, Hiram Buhrman, James M. Coale, Thomas Hammond, Henry R. Harris, Thomas Johnson

Personal details
- Died: November 7, 1896 Frederick, Maryland, U.S.
- Children: 7
- Occupation: Politician; farmer

Andrew Kessler (died November 7, 1896) was an American politician from Maryland.

== Career ==
Kessler served as a member of the Maryland House of Delegates, representing Frederick County from 1860 to 1861.

Kessler owned two farms near Jefferson.

== Personal life ==
Kessler had four sons and three daughters. His sons were Edward, Thomas, John and William. Towards the end of his life, he lived with his son in Jefferson.

Kessler died of heart failure while walking in Frederick on November 7, 1896, aged about 85.
