= Ulysses Hobbs =

American politician (1832–1911)

Member of the Maryland House of Delegates from the Frederick County district
- In office 1858–1860 Serving with Stephen R. Bowlus, Oliver P. Harding, John A. Koons, Jacob Root, John B. Thomas
- Preceded by: Lawrence J. Brengle, James S. Carper, James L. Davis, Daniel Grove, Peter Hauver, William N. Wolfe
- Succeeded by: Thomas J. Claggett, John A. Johnson, Andrew Kessler, Daniel W. Naill, Jonathan Routzahn, William E. Salmon

Personal details
- Born: April 29, 1832
- Died: August 14, 1911 (aged 79) Sabillasville, Maryland, U.S.
- Resting place: Mount Olivet Cemetery; Frederick, Maryland, U.S.
- Occupation: Politician; lawyer

Ulysses Hobbs (April 29, 1832 – August 14, 1911) was an American politician from Maryland. He served as a member of the Maryland House of Delegates, representing Frederick County from 1858 to 1860.

== Early life ==
Ulysses Hobbs was born on April 29, 1832, to William Hobbs.

== Career ==
Prior to the Civil War, Hobbs served as a lieutenant colonel in the Maryland militia. He was a captain of the Independent Riflemen. He was present at John Brown's raid on Harpers Ferry.

Hobbs worked as a lawyer in Howard and Frederick counties. He served as a member of the Maryland House of Delegates, representing Frederick County from 1858 to 1860. In 1890, he returned to Frederick to practice law. On August 1, 1893, he was appointed to the board of pension appeals.

== Personal life ==
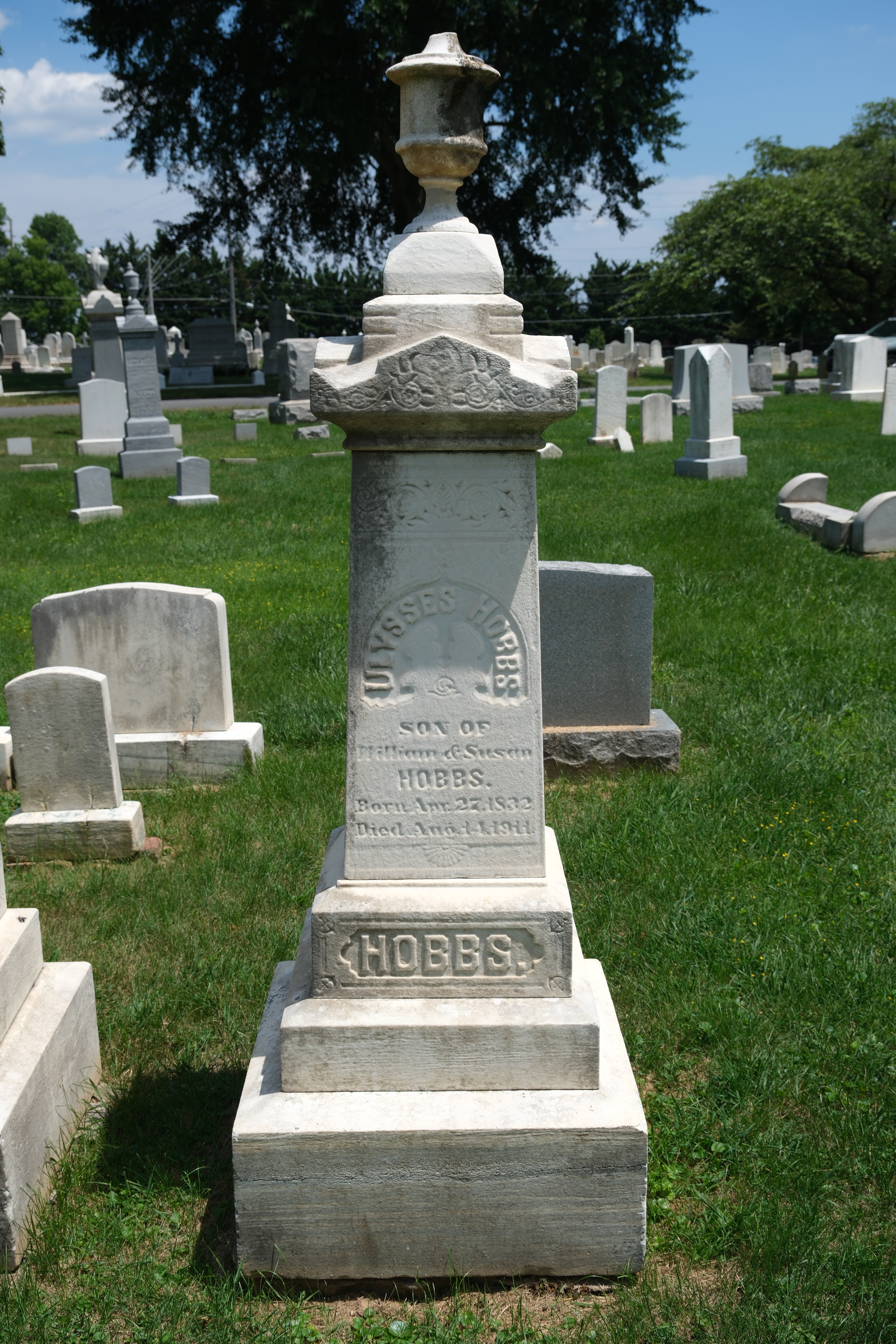
Grave of Hobbs at Mount Olivet Cemetery

Hobbs did not marry. Later in life, he lived with his brother-in-law Ignatius Dorsey in New Market.

Hobbs died on August 14, 1911, at the state sanatorium in Sabillasville. He was buried in Mount Olivet Cemetery.
