= Jacob Root =

American politician (died 1861)

Member of the Maryland House of Delegates from the Frederick County district
- In office 1858–1860 Serving with Stephen R. Bowlus, Oliver P. Harding, Ulysses Hobbs, John A. Koons, John B. Thomas
- Preceded by: Lawrence J. Brengle, James S. Carper, James L. Davis, Daniel Grove, Peter Hauver, William N. Wolfe
- Succeeded by: Thomas J. Claggett, John A. Johnson, Andrew Kessler, David W. Naill, Jonathan Routzahn, William E. Salmon
- In office 1849–1852 Serving with William P. Anderson, Daniel S. Biser, Benjamin A. Cunningham, Thomas H. O'Neal
- Preceded by: Gideon Bantz, John D. Gaither, Peter Grabill, William Lynch, John Need
- Succeeded by: William P. Anderson, James M. Coale, George W. Ent, James M. Geyer, John Lee, Henry McElfresh, Davis Richardson
- In office 1846–1847 Serving with George Doub, Peter Grabill, Jeremiah G. Morrison, James Stevens, Thomas Turner
- Preceded by: Daniel S. Biser, Henry Boteler, Francis J. Hoover, Enoch Louis Lowe, George Zollinger
- Succeeded by: Gideo Bantz, John D. Gaither, Peter Grabill, William Lynch, John Need

Personal details
- Died: May 27, 1861
- Occupation: Politician

Jacob Root (died May 27, 1861) was an American politician from Maryland.

== Biography ==
Jacob Root served as a member of the Maryland House of Delegates, representing Frederick County from 1846 to 1847, from 1849 to 1852, and from 1858 to 1860.

Root died on May 27, 1861.
