= Broad Run, Maryland =

Unincorporated community in Maryland, United States

- Unincorporated community
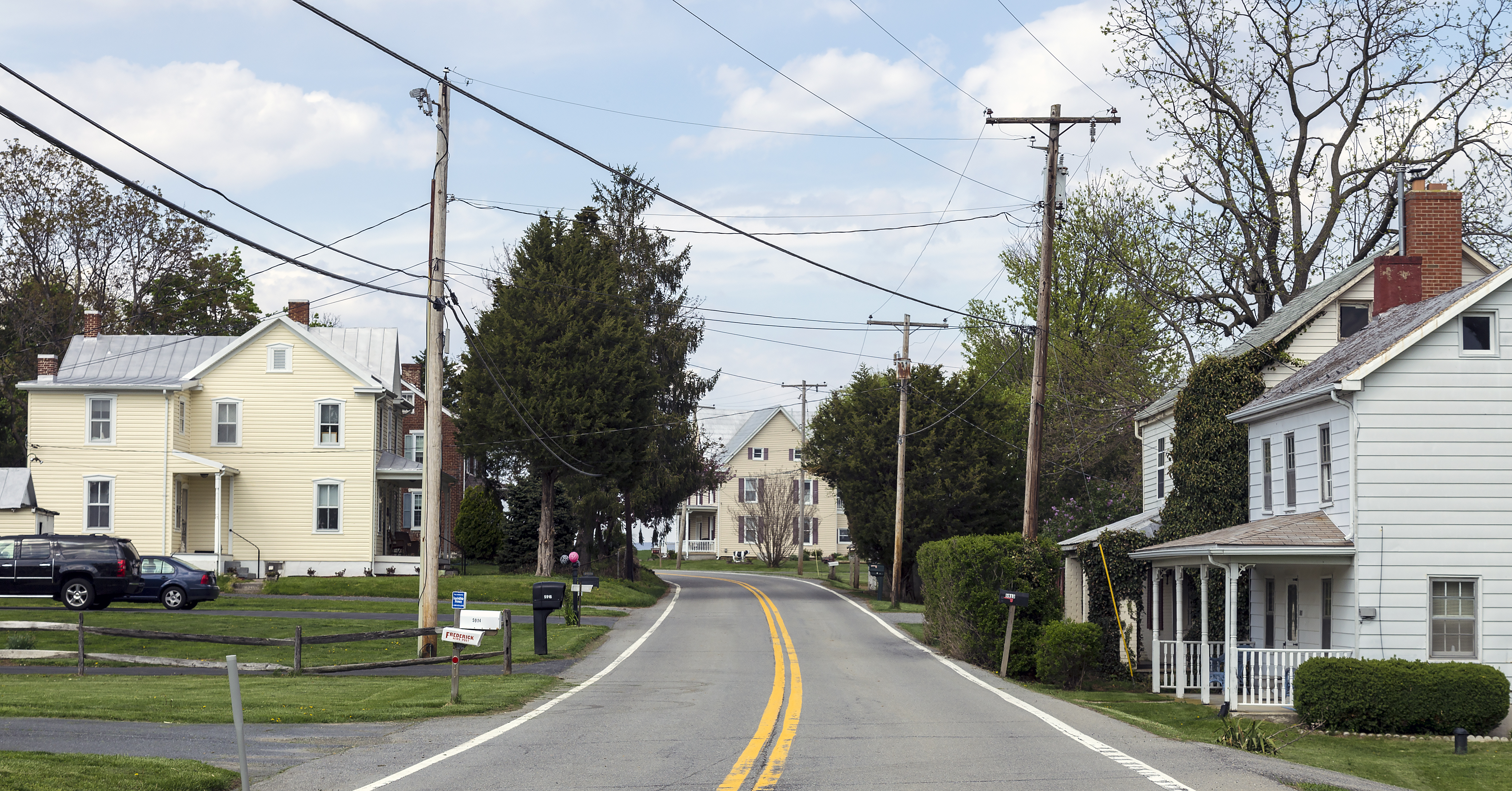
- Broad Run

- Location within Maryland
- Coordinates: 39°23′37″N 77°35′51″W
- Country: United States
- State: Maryland
- County: Frederick
- Elevation: 535 ft (163 m)
- Time zone: UTC-5 (Eastern (EST))
  - Summer (DST): UTC-4 (EDT)
- Area codes: 301 & 240
- GNIS feature ID: 589819

Broad Run is an unincorporated community in Frederick County, Maryland, United States. Broad Run is located on Maryland Route 383, 4.5 miles (7.2 km) southeast of Middletown.

== History ==
The village of Broad Run was settled in the mid-18th century as English settlers moved west from the Frederick area and German settlers moved south from Pennsylvania. The earliest land tracts were surveyed in the 1740s and one of the first east–west roads through the Middletown Valley, the "Touchstone" or "Monocacy to Antietam" road, passed to the south of Broad Run.

During the American Revolutionary War, Peter Suman, a farmer from Broad Run, was one of seven residents of Frederick County who were discovered as conspirators with Great Britain. On July 25, 1781, Suman and the other conspirators were tried and convicted by Judges Alexander Contee Hanson, Col. James Johnson, and Upton Sheradine as traitors to the revolutionary cause. The men were sentenced to be hanged, drawn, and quartered in Frederick. On August 17, 1781, Suman and two other conspirators, Casper Fritchie and Yost Peckler, were executed in Frederick. The other four conspirators were pardoned by Governor Thomas Sim Lee.

Broad Run developed into a local industrial center for the surrounding farms. The Isaac Bond Atlas of Frederick County, drawn in 1858, shows a saw mill and a grist mill were located along the Broad Run Creek in the village. In 1851, Manasses Jacob Grove, a native of Broad Run, built a brick storehouse at the crossroads which became the commercial center of the village for over a century, the last general store to operate there closing in the 1960s. After the Civil War, Manasses Grove established the M.J. Grove Lime Company, which became in its time one of the largest industries in Frederick County. Grove also served two terms in the Maryland House of Delegates from 1897–1891. The Broad Run Post Office was established on July 10, 1868 and operated until November 14, 1901. The village also had its own school.

The Pleasant View Church of the Brethren was established in Broad Run in 1776. The congregation, originally known as the Broad Run Dunker or German Baptist Church, met for worship services in the schoolhouses around the village for its first century of existence. The congregation erected a meeting house in 1876 a mile from the center of Broad Run. At that time, the church's name was changed to Pleasant View. The congregation continues to function today.
