= New London, Maryland =

Unincorporated community in Maryland, U.S.

Coordinates: 39°25′19″N 77°15′11″W

New London is an unincorporated community in Frederick County, Maryland, United States. Thomas Maynard House was listed on the National Register of Historic Places in 1979.
