= Thomas Maynard House =

Historic house in Maryland, US

- U.S. National Register of Historic Places
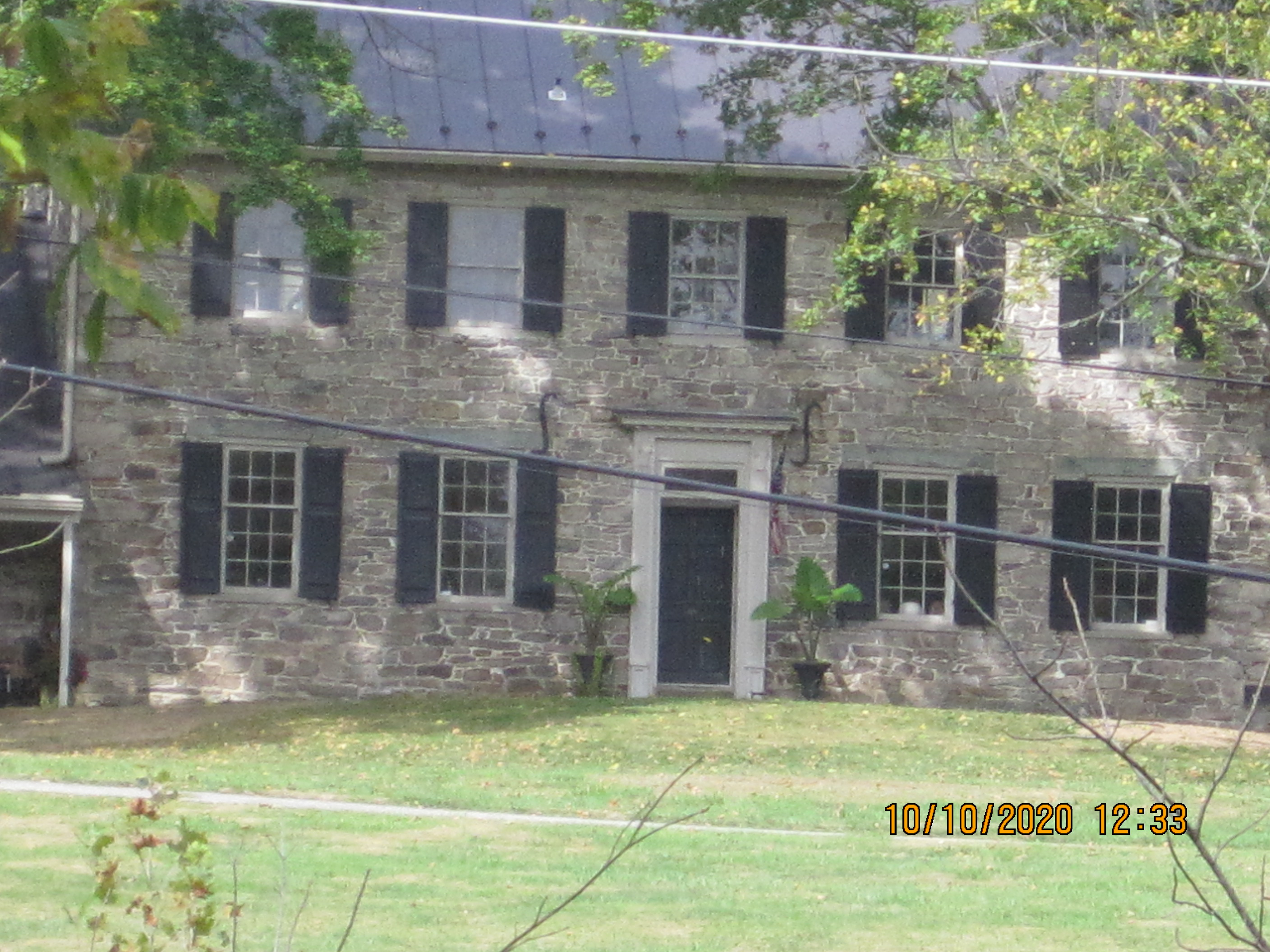

- Location within Maryland Location within the United States
- Location: 11022 Gas House Pike, New London, Maryland
- Coordinates: 39°25′42″N 77°16′54″W
- Area: 5 acres (2.0 ha)
- Built: 1809
- Architectural style: Georgian
- NRHP reference No.: 79001130
- Added to NRHP: July 18, 1979

The Thomas Maynard House is a historic home located at New London, Frederick County, Maryland, United States. It is a large 2 1/2-story, gable-roofed Georgian residence of random-coursed stone built about 1809.

The Thomas Maynard House was listed on the National Register of Historic Places in 1979.
