= James M. Coale =

American politician (died 1882)

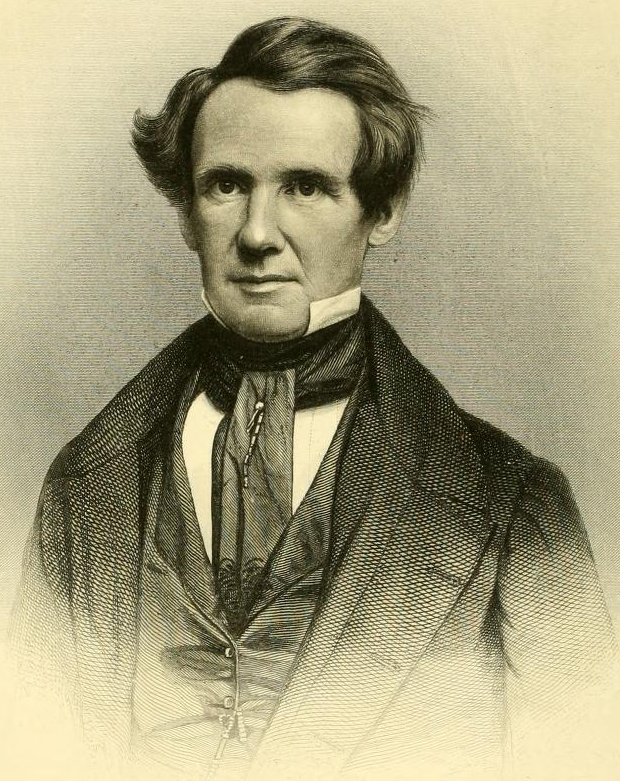
- Coale in a 1854 publication

Member of the Maryland House of Delegates from the Frederick County district
- In office 1861–1862 Serving with Joshua Biggs, Hiram Buhrman, Thomas Hammond, Henry R. Harris, Thomas Johnson
- Preceded by: Thomas J. Claggett, John A. Johnson, Andrew Kessler, David W. Naill, Jonathan Routzahn, William E. Salmon
- Succeeded by: Joshua Biggs, Upton Buhrman, Thomas Hammond, David Rinehart, Oliver P. Snyder, Charles E. Trail
- In office 1852–1853 Serving with William P. Anderson, George W. Ent, James M. Geyer, John Lee, Henry McElfresh, Davis Richardson
- Preceded by: William P. Anderson, Daniel S. Biser, Benjamin A. Cunningham, Thomas H. O'Neal, Jacob Root
- Succeeded by: William T. Gittings, James J. Johnson, Lewis M. Motter, William E. Salmon, William C. Sappington, David Thomas

Personal details
- Born: Liberty, Maryland, U.S.
- Died: February 22, 1882 (aged 78) Liberty, Maryland, U.S.
- Party: Whig
- Education: Mount St. Mary's University
- Occupation: Politician; lawyer

James M. Coale (died February 22, 1882) was an American politician and lawyer from Maryland. He served as a member of the Maryland House of Delegates, representing Frederick County from 1852 to 1853 and from 1861 to 1862.

== Early life ==
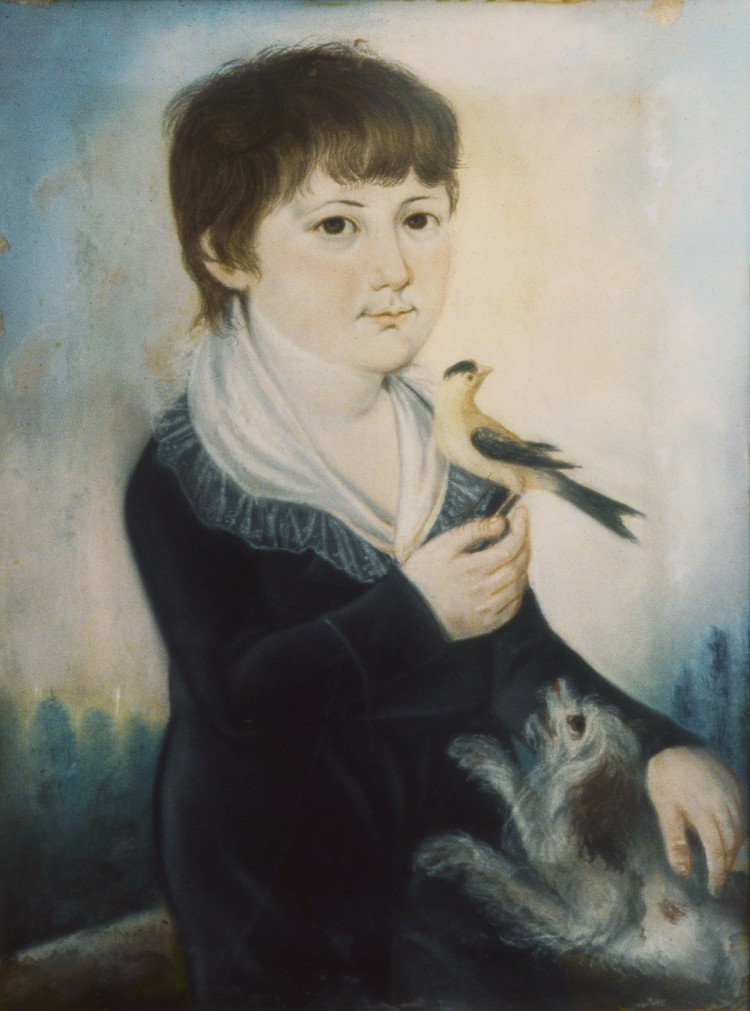
1811 portrait of Coale by Frederick Kemmelmeyer

James M. Coale was born in Liberty, Frederick County, Maryland, to Catharine (née McSherry) and Richard Coale. His father was a surgeon on a naval cruiser during the Revolutionary War and afterward worked as a farmer in Frederick County. Coale studied at the school that would later be named Mount St. Mary's University. He studied in the law offices of Richard Potts in Frederick. After three years of study, he was admitted to the bar in 1827.

== Career ==
Coale was a Whig. In 1840, he was nominated as a presidential elector. He became president of the Chesapeake and Ohio Canal Company in August 1843. He served as president until his announcement to stockholders that the canal was completed on February 27, 1851. He was brigadier general of the 9th Brigade of the Maryland Militia.

Coale served as a member of the Maryland House of Delegates, representing Frederick County, from 1852 to 1853 and from 1861 to 1862. He was credited with defeating Edwin Stanton's plan to divide the eastern shore of Maryland into Delaware.

== Personal life ==
Coale did not marry. His sister Sarah married state senator and delegate Thomas Sappington.

Coale died on February 22, 1882, aged 78, at his home in Liberty.
