= Unconditional Union Party =

Political party in the United States

- Other name: Radical Union Party (Missouri)
- Leader: B. Gratz Brown; Henry Winter Davis
- Founded: 1863; 163 years ago
- Dissolved: 1867; 159 years ago
- Split from: Union Party
- Merged into: Republican Party
- Ideology: Unconditional Unionism; Abolitionism; Radical Reconstruction
- National affiliation: Radical Republicans

The Unconditional Union Party was a unionist political party in the United States during the American Civil War. It was a regional counterpart to the National Union Party that supported the wartime administration of Abraham Lincoln. The party was active in the border states and Union-occupied areas of the Confederacy. After the war, it formed the nucleus of the Republican Party in the Upper South.

Following the commencement of hostilities in April 1861, Unionists won critical elections in Kentucky and Maryland ahead of the July 4 emergency session of Congress and established provisional governments in Missouri and the western counties of Virginia. Emancipation and the enlistment of Black soldiers split the Unionist movement, with Radicals embracing calls for the immediate abolition of slavery in response to wartime exigencies. Factional strife culminated in a formal schism between the Conservative Unionists and the Radicals, who called themselves the Unconditional Union Party to signify their uncompromising support for the war effort.

Nationally, Unconditional Unionists aligned themselves with the Radical Republicans in calling for the immediate abolition of slavery in the United States, the enlistment of Black soldiers to fight in the Union Army, and the aggressive prosecution of the war. They frequently clashed with the Lincoln administration and Conservative Unionists in their own states over issues related to emancipation, military appointments and strategy, and the looming issue of Reconstruction. Some Radicals favored running a candidate against Lincoln in the 1864 United States presidential election, but most eventually supported Lincoln's re-election on the National Union ticket. After the war, the party continued to operate as a regional counterpart to the Republican Party. Circumstances emerging from Reconstruction, particularly the introduction of Black suffrage, led state parties to adopt the Republican label in the late 1860s, although in Missouri the Republican organization continued to call itself the Radical Union Party as late as 1870.
