= D. John Markey =

American politician, Army officer and football coach (1882–1963)

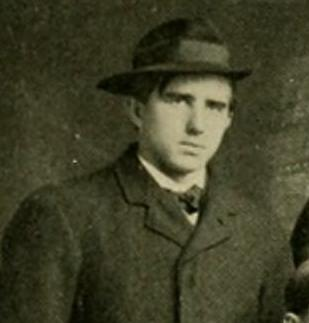
- Markey at Maryland Agricultural in 1902

Biographical details
- Born: October 7, 1882; Frederick, Maryland, U.S.
- Died: July 20, 1963 (aged 80); Newcomb, Maryland, U.S.

Playing career
- 1900: Western Maryland
- 1902–1903: Maryland
- Position: Halfback

Coaching career (HC unless noted)
- 1900: Western Maryland (assistant)
- 1902–1904: Maryland

Head coaching record
- Overall: 12–13–4

David John Markey (October 7, 1882 – July 20, 1963) was an American politician, Army officer, businessman, and college football coach. He ran a controversial unsuccessful campaign for a United States Senate seat against former Maryland governor Herbert R. O'Conor in 1946.

Markey also served as the head football coach at Maryland Agricultural College—now known as the University of Maryland, College Park—from 1902 to 1904, compiling a record of 12–13–4.

== Early life ==
Markey was born in Frederick, Maryland, on October 7, 1882, to parents John Hanshew and Ida Maria (née Willard) Markey. D. John Markey attended Frederick City High School. In 1898, he left high school and volunteered to serve in the Spanish–American War in the United States Army as part of a company of the First Maryland Infantry Regiment raised in Frederick. One of his ancestors, Johann David Markey, immigrated to Frederick from the Electorate of the Palatinate in 1736. Johann David Markey's son of the same name served in the War of 1812 and with the 16th Regiment of the Maryland Militia.

The Markey family was alternatively described as of Scotch-Irish origin and "early settled in Frederick County". Markey's grandfather, also D. John Markey, was an owner of lumber yards and mills in the county. His father, John Hanshew Markey, was born in Frederick in 1834 and became a prominent resident of the city, long-time shoe merchant, and a lifelong Democrat and member of the Episcopal Church.

== Coaching career ==
In his youth, Markey played sandlot football for several years in his native Frederick. During his service in the First Maryland Infantry Regiment, he played as a reserve halfback on the unit's football team, which featured former players from several Eastern colleges including Columbia, Cornell, Harvard, Penn, Princeton, and Yale. In 1900, he served as an assistant football coach at Western Maryland College (now McDaniel College), where he also played as a halfback. In 1902, the Maryland Agricultural College (now the University of Maryland) hired Markey as the first professional head coach of its football team with a salary of $300 ($11,163 adjusted for inflation). Markey reinstated a physical training regimen, which had first been implemented by Grenville Lewis in 1896, and also introduced the tackling dummy to team practices. His coaching stressed the fundamentals of blocking and tackle, and he was assisted by Emmons Dunbar, who had been mentored as a youth by legendary coach Glenn "Pop" Warner in his native Springville, New York.

Although he had not intended to play on the team as its head coach, Markey filled in for a Maryland halfback, Ed Brown, who quit after receiving a death threat from a Georgetown fan in the season-opener. Markey led Maryland to a 3–5–2 record in his first season and improved to 7–4 in 1903. In 1904, after the school refused him a salary increase, he coached only part-time. Markey commuted from Frederick twice a week to coach the team, while chemistry professor Buck Wharton was responsible for coaching duties the other four days. After the team posted a 2–4–2 record that season, Markey and the school ended their arrangement by mutual consent, and he was replaced as coach by State Department lawyer Fred K. Nielsen. During his tenure at Maryland from 1902 to 1904, Markey compiled a 12–13–4 record.

== Return to Frederick ==
He returned to Frederick to enter business selling hats and shoes, and became "one of the best known and leading of the younger business men of Frederick". In 1905, at the rank of captain, he was responsible for standing up Company A of the Maryland National Guard. At this time, he held an independent political affiliation, served as the director of the Frederick Young Men's Christian Association, and participated in the city's Junior Fire Company. Markey was a member of the Reformed Church. On June 13, 1907, he married Edna née Mullinix. In 1912, he became the first president of the newly established Frederick Chamber of Commerce.

== World War I service ==
In 1916, at the rank of major, Markey commanded the 112th Machine Gun Battalion of the 1st Maryland Infantry Regiment. Markey later received a Distinguished Service Medal for acting as Brigade Adjutant in addition to his duties as commander of the Machine Gun Battalion, 58th Brigade, 29th Division in 1918 north of Verdun. He eventually took command of the 115th Infantry Regiment. During the war, Markey rose to the rank of brigadier general, and served on the General Staff of the U.S. Army. In 1923, Markey was serving as the Chairman of the Military Affairs Committee of the American Legion. From 1924 to 1963, he was on the American Battle Monuments Commission. Under General John J. Pershing, from 1933 to 1937, he was responsible for the building of nineteen chapels and war monuments in Europe.

== Political career ==
In 1946, Markey ran a closely contested but unsuccessful campaign for one of Maryland's U.S. Senate seats as a Republican against former Governor Herbert O'Conor. After the vote, both candidates claimed victory, before the official count declared O'Conor the winner by a margin of 2,232 out of more than 470,000 votes cast. On December 10, 1946, Markey requested the Special Committee to Investigate Senatorial Campaign Expenditures conduct a recount in Baltimore and Montgomery County, which had used voting machines. He asked for a prompt recount and also alleged his opponents' campaign had committed financing violations. The committee agreed because Maryland was unable to conduct its own official recount, and found a variation of about 400 votes. The committee then sought to survey five additional counties that were likely to have irregularities. Markey requested a full recount of the entire state.

In the meantime, O'Conor was sworn into the Senate seat on January 4, 1947, after a slight delay. Throughout the recounts, Markey implored the process be done quickly, and implied that the election evidence could go missing at any moment. In May 1947, upon completion of the recount of the five additional counties, O'Conor still maintained a margin of 1,465 votes. In the aftermath, Markey complained of the O'Conor administration's control of the state government, the Democratic Party's control of the state since 1864, and law enforcement's failure to prevent polling abuses. By contrast, Democratic Maryland senator Millard Tydings alleged partisan bias on the part of the Republican-led investigating subcommittee. The committee completed its full recount of the state in January 1948, and concluded that O'Conor had secured a 1,624-vote majority.

Markey made another unsuccessful senate bid in 1950 against Republican businessman John Marshall Butler. Markey held a position as commander of the Maryland American Legion from 1923 to 1924.

== Death ==
Markey killed himself on July 20, 1963, by shooting himself with a .22 caliber rifle. He was interred at Arlington National Cemetery. Markey and wife Edna had two children, D. John "Jack" Markey and Mary Elizabeth Hooper.

== Head coaching record ==
Year	Team	Overall	Conference	Standing	Bowl/playoffs
Maryland Aggies (Independent) (1900)
1902	Maryland	3–5–2			
1903	Maryland	7–4			
1904	Maryland	2–4–2			
Maryland:		12–13–4			
Total:		12–13–4			

Party political offices
Preceded by Harry Nice	Republican nominee for United States Senator from Maryland (Class 1); 1946	Succeeded by James Glenn Beall
