= Shriver =

Shriver is an occupational surname. The name derives from the Indo-European root word 'shrive', which came to mean "to write", and which relates to multiple modern words, including in English 'scribe' and 'scrivener' and in German 'schreiben' (to write).

Shriver is the Pennsylvania German form of the Standard German surname Schreiber in English spelling. The surname Shriver may refer to:

- Anthony Shriver (born 1965), American political activist
- Bobby Shriver (born 1954), American politician
- Brian Shriver (born 1987), American soccer player
- David Shriver (1735–1826), American politician and judge from Maryland
- David Shriver Jr. (1769–1852), American politician and engineer from Maryland
- Edward Shriver (1812–1896), American politician from Maryland
- Eunice Kennedy Shriver (1921–2009), American disability rights activist
- Garner E. Shriver (1912–1998), American politician
- Isaac Shriver (1777–1856), American politician from Maryland
- Jacob Shriver (1779–1841), American politician from Maryland
- Jerry Shriver (1941–1969), US Army special forces and MACV-SOG soldier
- Lionel Shriver (born 1957), female American writer
- Loren Shriver (born 1944), American astronaut
- Maria Shriver (born 1955), American journalist
- Mark D. Shriver (born 1965), American geneticist
- Mark Kennedy Shriver (born 1964), American politician
- Marley Shriver (born 1937), American swimmer
- Pam Shriver (born 1962), American tennis player
- Phillip Shriver (1922–2011), American historian
- Sargent Shriver (1915–2011), American politician
- Thomas H. Shriver (1846–1916), American politician
- Timothy Shriver (born 1959), American nonprofit leader
