= Shriver family =

US political family

Shriver
- Political family
- Country: United States
- Current region: Maryland, California
- Origin: Westminster, Maryland
- Founded: 1721; 305 years ago
- Founder: David Shriver
- Estate: Shriver Homestead

The Shriver family is a U.S. political family rooted in Maryland. Many of the family members have pursued political office.

== Members ==
- David Shriver (1735–1826)
  - Maryland House of Delegates, 1799–1803
  - Maryland Senate, 1804–1811
- David Shriver Jr. (1769–1852)
  - Maryland House of Delegates, 1807–1807
- Isaac Shriver (1777–1856)
  - Maryland House of Delegates, 1811–1812, 1827–1827, 1829–1829, 1835–1836
- Jacob Shriver (1779 – 1841)
  - Maryland House of Delegates, 1828–1828
- Edward Shriver (1812 – 1896)
  - Maryland House of Delegates, 1843–1844
- Thomas H. Shriver (1846 – 1916)
  - Maryland House of Delegates, 1878–1880
  - Maryland Senate, 1884–1886
- Sargent Shriver (1915 –2011)
  - President of the Chicago Board of Education, 1955–1960
  - 1st Director of the Peace Corps, 1961–1966
  - Director of the Office of Economic Opportunity, 1964–1968
  - United States Ambassador to France, 1968–1970
- Bobby Shriver (born 1954)
  - Member of the Santa Monica City Council, 2004–2012
  - Mayor of Santa Monica, 2010–2010
- Maria Shriver (born 1955), journalist; ex-wife of former governor of California and actor Arnold Schwarzenegger
  - 35th First Lady of California, 2003–2011
- Mark Kennedy Shriver (born 1964)
  - Maryland House of Delegates, 1995–2003

=== Connections to other prominent families ===
In 1953, Sargent Shriver married Eunice Kennedy, member of the Kennedy family and sister of U.S. President John F. Kennedy and U.S. Senators Robert F. Kennedy and Ted Kennedy.

== Residences ==
The residence most commonly associated with the family is Union Mills Homestead Historic District, it was home to the Shriver family for 6 generations. It is currently a historic landmark located near Westminster, Maryland, about 17 miles south of Gettysburg, Pennsylvania.

== See also ==
- Kennedy family
- List of U.S. political families
