= Timothy Shriver =

American non-profit executive (born 1959)

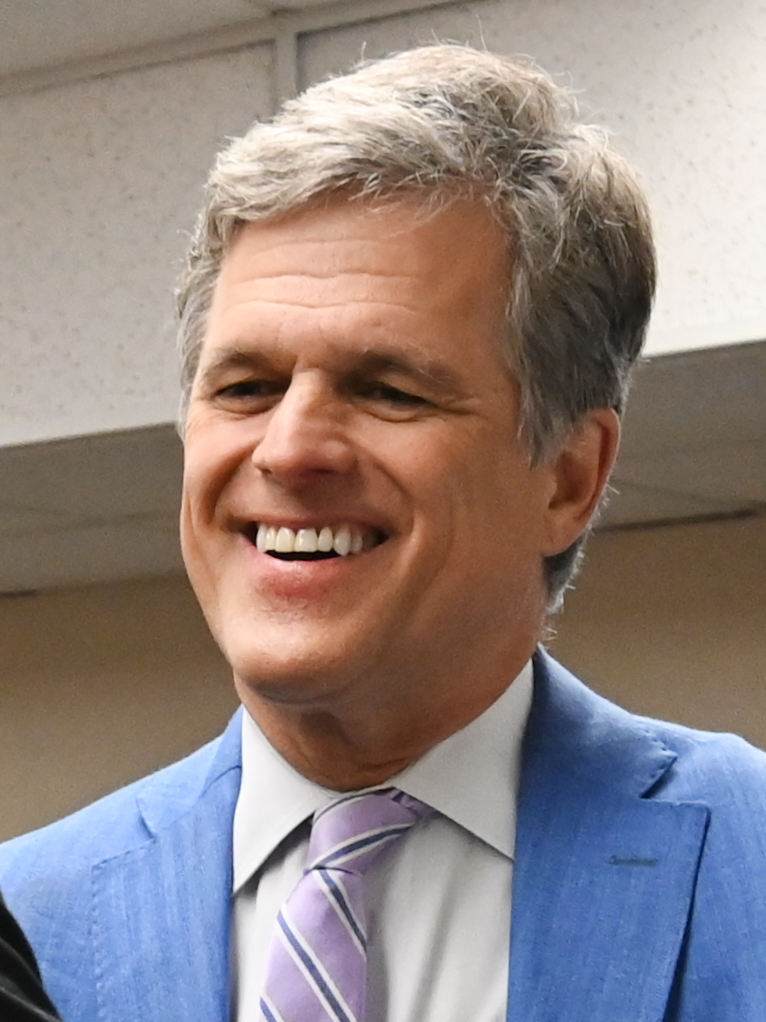
- Shriver in 2025
- Born: August 29, 1959 (age 67); Boston, Massachusetts, U.S.
- Education: Yale University (BA); Catholic University of America (MA); University of Connecticut (PhD)
- Occupation: Chairman of Special Olympics
- Political party: Democratic
- Spouse: Linda Potter (m. 1986)
- Children: 5
- Parents: Sargent Shriver; Eunice Kennedy Shriver
- Relatives: Shriver family Kennedy family

Timothy Perry Shriver (born August 29, 1959) is an American disability rights activist, film producer, and former educator who has been Chairman of Special Olympics since 1996 and is the founder of UNITE. He is a member of the prominent Shriver and Kennedy families, as the third child of Eunice Kennedy Shriver (who founded the Special Olympics), and Sargent Shriver, who helped found the Peace Corps.

== Early life and education ==
Timothy Shriver was born in Boston, Massachusetts to Sargent Shriver, a former United States Ambassador to France and the Democratic Party's vice-presidential candidate in 1972, and Eunice Kennedy Shriver, the founder of Special Olympics. He was raised as a Catholic along with his siblings, Bobby Shriver, Maria Shriver, Mark Shriver, and Anthony Shriver. He is a member of the Kennedy Family through his mother, Eunice Kennedy Shriver, a younger sister of President John F. Kennedy. A member of the prominent Shriver family, his ancestor David Shriver was a delegate of Frederick County, Maryland, who signed the Maryland Constitution and Bill of Rights at Maryland's Constitutional Convention of 1776.

Shriver graduated from St. Albans School. He received his B.A. from Yale University in 1981, his M.A. in religion and religious education from The Catholic University of America in 1988, and his Ph.D. in education from the University of Connecticut in 1996. He participated in the 1997 class of the Global Leaders for Tomorrow program hosted by the World Economic Forum.

== Career ==
Shriver spent 15 years in public education—some in special education—as a teacher. He served as a high school teacher in the New Haven, Connecticut public school system, and as a counselor and teacher in the University of Connecticut branch of the Upward Bound program for disadvantaged youth. He became a Fellow at the School Development Program at the Yale Child Study Center.

He was instrumental in establishing the Social Development Project at the public schools in New Haven, Connecticut and also established the Collaborative for Academic, Social and Emotional Learning at the University of Illinois at Chicago.

He was the executive producer on The Ringer, a co-producer on Amistad and the Disney movie The Loretta Claiborne Story, and has served as a producer or co-producer on shows for the American Broadcasting Company, the National Broadcasting Corporation, and the TNT cable channel. He is currently a board member of Malaria No More, a New York-based nonprofit that was launched at the 2006 White House Summit with the goal of ending all deaths caused by malaria.

He is currently the Chairman of Special Olympics. Timothy and his brother Anthony Shriver have recently aligned the Special Olympics and Best Buddies (founded by Anthony Shriver), to create the Eunice Kennedy Shriver Challenge event, aimed to encourage greater acceptance and inclusion for those with intellectual and developmental disabilities, a condition that affected their late aunt Rosemary Kennedy. Shriver has served on the Board of Directors of The Future Project, a national initiative to empower young people to discover their passion and change the world, since its founding. And he has written a memoir Fully Alive: Discovering What Matters Most, published by Farrar, Straus and Giroux (2014).

In recent years, Shriver stepped down as CEO from the Special Olympics to launch UNITE, a national initiative for bringing Americans across divides together in common purpose to address universal challenges that can only be solved together.

=== Activism ===
As chairman of Special Olympics, Timothy Shriver has campaigned against mocking of and discrimination against participants in Special Olympics. He has specifically argued against use of what he calls "the R word," meaning retarded, stating that the word, "retard", is very offensive and people with intellectual disabilities should be respected and treated like all other people.

In 2008, Shriver and supporters called for a boycott of the movie Tropic Thunder, claiming that it mocks people with mental disabilities. The movie is written, produced by, and stars Ben Stiller. In a commentary for CNN, Shriver wrote in part,

Together with the members of the international coalition, I am asking Steven Spielberg, Stacey Snider, Ben Stiller and the entire "Tropic Thunder" team to stop showing the film, and asking movie theaters and moviegoers to shut this movie out. "Tropic Thunder" is a colossal blunder. Don't show or see "Tropic Thunder." The degrading use of the word "retard" together with the broader humiliation of people with intellectual disabilities in the film goes way too far. When the R-word is casually bandied about and when bumbling, clueless caricatures designed to mimic the behavior of people with intellectual disabilities are on screen, they have an unmistakable outcome: They mock, directly or indirectly, people with intellectual disabilities. They perpetuate the worst stereotypes. They further exclusion and isolation. They are simply mean.

== Fully Alive: Discovering What Matters Most ==
In November 2014, Shriver released a book called Fully Alive: Discovering What Matters Most.

== Personal life ==
Shriver is Catholic. He married Linda S. Potter (born January 13, 1956) on May 31, 1986 at Dahlgren Chapel on the Georgetown University campus. They reside in Chevy Chase, Maryland and have five children: Sophia Rose "Rosie" Shriver Newbert (born 1987); Timothy "Timbo" Perry Shriver, Jr. (born 1988); Samuel "Sam" Kennedy Shriver (born 1992); Kathleen Frances Shriver (born 1994); Caroline Elizabeth Shriver (born 1997).

Potter is the great-granddaughter of Archibald D. Russell; a great-great-granddaughter of Percy Rivington Pyne I; and a great-great-great-granddaughter of Dr. James Russell, a former president of the Royal Society of Edinburgh; and a great-great-great-granddaughter of Moses Taylor, one of the most successful American railroad, iron, and coal company financiers and who was president of National City Bank for 27 years. She is also a direct descendant of the merchant Russell Sturgis (1750-1826), Elizabeth (née Perkins) Sturgis (a sister of merchant Thomas Handasyd Perkins), Walter Rutherfurd (1723–1804) and Catherine Alexander (1727–1801), daughter of James Alexander and Mary Spratt Provoost.

== Awards and honors ==
- 2024 Honorary degree from Grand Valley State University
- 2022 Honorary degree from Georgetown University
- 2019 Honorary degree from Fordham University
- 2012 Honorary degree from Villanova University
- 2011 Honorary degree from La Salle University
- Honorary degree from University of Connecticut
- Honorary degree from Niagara University
- Honorary degree from Albertus Magnus College
- The Medal of the City of Athens, Greece
- 1995 Connecticut Citizen of the Year.
- Honorary degree from Loyola University
- Honorary degree from New England College
- The Order de Manuel Amador Guerrera of the Republic of Panama
- Presidential Medallion from University of Illinois
- Honorary degree from Springfield College
- Walter Camp 2015 "Distinguished American"
- Honorary degree from Saint Peter's University
- Laetare Medal from the University of Notre Dame

== Board membership ==
- American Association on Intellectual and Developmental Disabilities
- Board of the Education Commission of the States' Compact for Learning and Citizenship
- Chairman, Collaborative for Academic, Social, and Emotional Learning
- Council on Foreign Relations
- The Edison Schools Incorporated
- The Frank Porter Graham Child Development Center at the University of North Carolina at Chapel Hill
- Board of Advisors for HealthCorps
- Chairman UNESCO at IT Tralee (United Nations Educational, Scientific and Cultural Organization)

== See also ==
Siblings of Timothy Shriver:

- Maria Owings Shriver (b. 1955)
- Mark Kennedy Shriver (b. 1964)
- Robert Sargent Shriver III (b. 1954)
- Anthony Paul Kennedy Shriver (b. 1965)
