= Scriver =

Scriver is an occupational surname of German origin, which means a "scribe" or "writer." Alternative spellings include Schriver and Shriver. The name may refer to:

- Charles Scriver (1930–2023), Canadian pediatrician
- Christian Scriver (1629–1693), German writer
- Julius Scriver (1826–1907), Canadian politician
- Robert Scriver (1914–1999), American sculptor

== See also ==
- Schreiber (surname)
- Schriver
- Shriver
