= Schriver =

Schriver is a surname. Notable people with the surname include:

- Henry Schriver (1914–2011), member of the Ohio House of Representatives
- Iver Schriver (born 1949), Danish footballer
- Josh Schriver, member of the Michigan House of Representatives
- Ollie Schriver (1879–1947), American Gunnery Sergeant
- Pop Schriver (1865–1932), American baseball player
- Ramblin' Lou Schriver (1929–2016), American radio personality
- Randall Schriver (born 1967), American federal government official

== See also ==
- Schrijver
- Shriver
- Schreiber (disambiguation)
