= James Shriver =

19th-century American canal engineer

- Born: 1794; Littlestown, Pennsylvania, U.S.
- Died: August 8, 1826; Fort Wayne, Indiana, U.S.
- Occupation: Civil engineer
- Known for: Surveying the Chesapeake and Ohio Canal and National Road
- Spouse(s): Elizabeth Beeson Miller; Eliza Miller
- Children: 2

James Shriver (1794 – August 8, 1826) was an American civil engineer known for his pioneering surveys of the Chesapeake and Ohio Canal, the National Road, and the proposed Wabash–Maumee canal in Indiana. A native of Maryland and Pennsylvania, he helped shape federal and state internal improvement projects during the 1820s, and died while serving as chief of a government survey party in the Indiana frontier.

== Early life and education ==
Shriver was born in 1794 in Littlestown, Pennsylvania, into the prominent Shriver family. His parents, Andrew and Mary Shriver, moved to Union Mills, Maryland, in 1797. There, Shriver received a practical education and learned surveying and engineering through an informal apprenticeship with his uncle, David Shriver Jr., a key figure in Maryland's early infrastructure development.

== National Road ==
Shriver began his engineering career in 1815 as an assistant to his uncle on the construction of the National Road between Cumberland, Maryland, and Wheeling, Virginia (now West Virginia). He gained extensive field experience in Appalachian terrain and internal improvements. By 1820, peers had suggested him as a successor to David Shriver Jr. for leading road work.

== Chesapeake and Ohio Canal ==
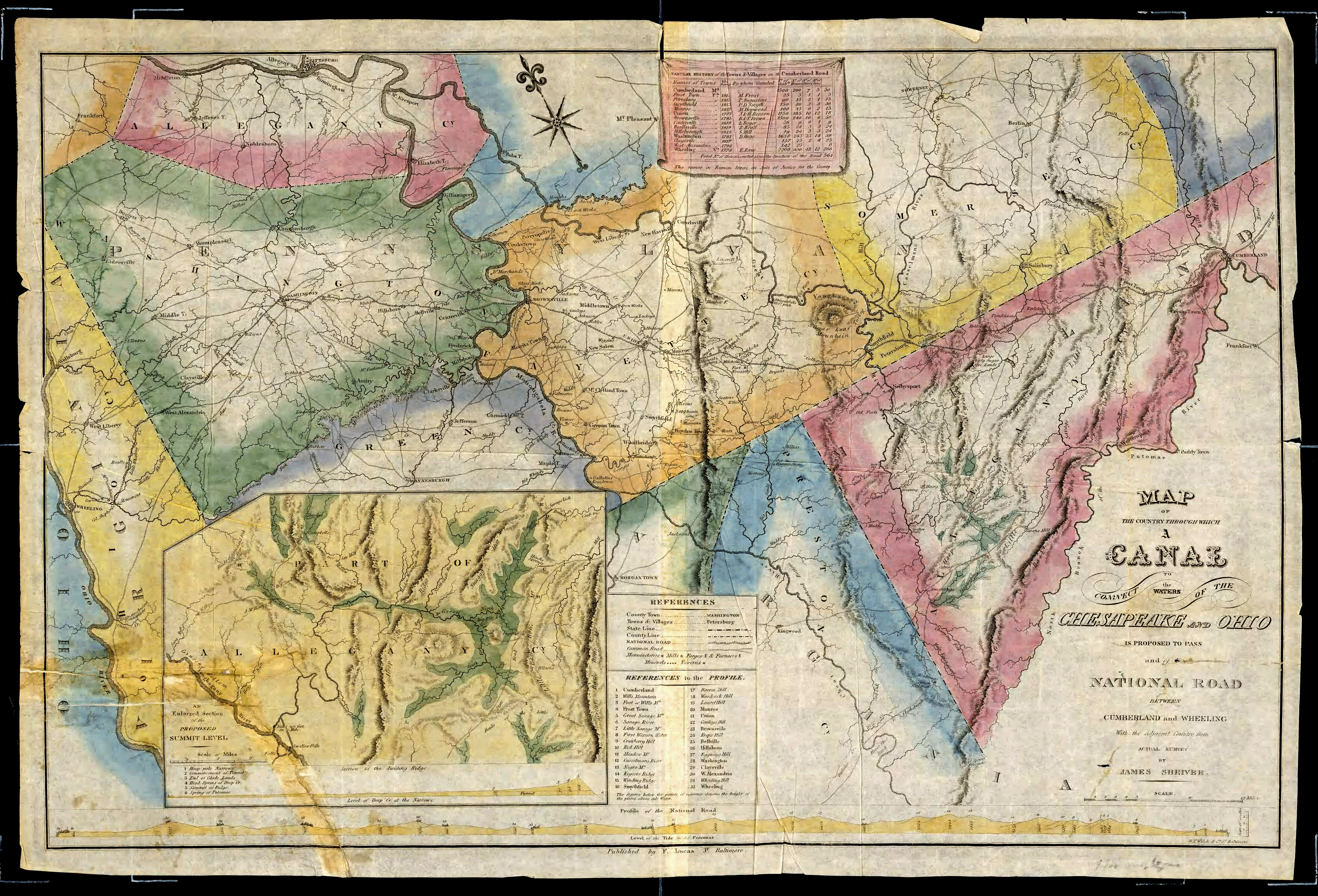
1824 C&O Canal map by James Shriver, civil engineer

In 1823–24, Shriver conducted an independent survey of a proposed canal route from the Potomac River westward to the Ohio River. He published the results in a 116-page report titled An Account of Surveys and Examinations… relative to the projected Chesapeake and Ohio, and Ohio and Lake Erie Canals (Baltimore: Lucas, 1824), accompanied by a large engraved map.

At the Washington canal convention in 1824, Shriver presented his findings to national leaders, receiving praise from Senator Henry Clay and Representative Andrew Stewart. His work dispelled doubts about the feasibility of a canal through the Potomac Valley.

In 1825, Shriver was appointed an Assistant Engineer under the U.S. Board of Internal Improvements. At that time, the Board appointed three survey parties ("brigades", in the terms of the 1825 report), headed by John James Abert, William Gibbs McNeill (1801–1853), and Schriver. Shriver was assisted by Jonathan Knight, John Shoebridge Williams (1790-1878), Freeman Lewis (1780-1859), and Joseph Shriver, a brother of James Schriver.

Schriver led his survey party over the mountainous section of the proposed C&O route near the Maryland–Virginia border. His official report (dated January 30, 1826) to the War Department confirmed the technical viability of a canal from Washington to Cumberland, Maryland.

== Death in Indiana ==
In summer 1826, Shriver was assigned to lead the federal survey of a canal route between the Wabash River and the Maumee River near Fort Wayne, Indiana. While conducting fieldwork in the malarial swamps of northeastern Indiana, he contracted typhus fever and died in his tent on August 8, 1826.

Shriver was buried near the St. Mary's River in Fort Wayne with military and Masonic honors. His assistant, Col. Asa Moore, died shortly afterward of the same illness. The work Shriver completed helped guide the eventual construction of the Wabash & Erie Canal, begun in 1832.

== Personal life ==
Shriver married Elizabeth Beeson Miller of Uniontown, Pennsylvania, in 1819. They had two children. After Elizabeth's death around 1823, he married her sister, Eliza Miller, shortly before leaving for Indiana. After his death, his children were raised by their grandparents at the Shriver homestead in Union Mills, Maryland.

== Legacy ==
James Shriver's surveys and reports influenced the alignment and construction of the National Road, the Chesapeake & Ohio Canal, and proposed canal connections in the Midwest. His 1824 report and engraved map are preserved in historical collections and considered foundational in early American engineering. He is remembered as one of the first professional civil engineers in the U.S. to work full-time on large-scale infrastructure planning under federal authority.

== Selected works ==
- Shriver, James. An Account of Surveys and Examinations… relative to the projected Chesapeake and Ohio, and Ohio and Lake Erie Canals. Baltimore: Fielding Lucas Jr., 1824.

== See also ==
- Chesapeake and Ohio Canal
- National Road
- David Shriver Jr.
- Board of Engineers for Internal Improvements
- Wabash and Erie Canal
