= Eli Jacobs =

American baseball executive (born 1937)

Eli Solomon Jacobs (born October 5, 1937) is an American financier and attorney, member of the National Commission for the Review of the National Reconnaissance Office and the former owner of the Baltimore Orioles from 1989 to 1993.

== Rise to success ==
Jacobs was born in Cambridge, Massachusetts on October 5, 1937, and raised in nearby Newton. After graduating from Phillips Academy in Andover, he attended Yale College, where he was the managing editor of the Yale Daily News and a member of the Army Reserve Officers' Training Corps. After graduating from Yale College in 1959, he served two years in the United States Army in intelligence stationed at Fort Holabird in Baltimore, Maryland. Following military service, he attended Yale Law School, earning a law degree in 1964.

His career began immediately at the Wall Street investment banking establishment White Weld & Co., where he became one of its youngest partners by 1968. After his departure from the firm in 1970, he spent more than a decade as a stock market investor and venture capitalist. He served on the U.S. Commission of Fine Arts from 1976 to 1980.

Beginning in 1983, he formed an investment firm with Peter G. Peterson, who had stepped down as the President of Lehman Brothers. The partnership lasted for a few years until Peterson left to create the Blackstone Group with Stephen A. Schwarzman. Jacobs then established his own firm, Manhattan-based E.S. Jacobs & Co., in 1986, he built an investment portfolio with investments in private equity, venture capital, and real estate. Investments included controlling interest in Memorex and Triangle Pacific Corp., a maker of cabinets and wood flooring. In December, 1987, he completed a $900 million acquisition of Telex Corp., which would be merged with Memorex to form, at the time, the world's second largest manufacturer of computer peripherals. He also served on the board of directors of Times Mirror Co.

== Baltimore Orioles ==
Jacobs, along with Larry Lucchino (a holdover from the previous ownership), Sargent Shriver and his eldest son Bobby, announced their purchase of the Baltimore Orioles from the estate of the late Edward Bennett Williams for $70 million on December 5, 1988. The transaction was unanimously approved by the American League (AL) franchise owners just over four months later on April 18, 1989, two weeks into the new baseball season. The owner of 87% of the ballclub, Jacobs became the chairman of the board, with Lucchino managing the organization.

In his 1994 book The Baltimore Orioles: Forty Years of Magic from 33rd Street to Camden Yards, Ted Patterson made the following observation of the new majority owner:

Jacobs was a New Yorker with a flat personality who found it awkward being in the public eye. Winning and losing seemed inconsequential. He used the Orioles as a vehicle to entertain and impress high rollers in government, business, and entertainment.

In the first year of the Jacobs regime, the Orioles nearly shocked the baseball world by transforming itself from the worst team in Major League Baseball with a 54–107 record in 1988 to one that fell short of winning the AL Eastern Division title by two games, finishing at 87-75.

== Bankruptcy ==
When seven banks filed petitions to force him into bankruptcy in March 1993, Jacobs had to relinquish the Orioles. At an auction held in bankruptcy court in New York on August 2, 1993, the ballclub was sold for $173 million to a group of Baltimore investors led by Peter Angelos. The sale was unanimously approved by the AL club owners two months later on October 4.

== Later years ==
Affiliated with the Republican Party, Jacobs has served on various national security and military intelligence committees for the federal government. He was a member of the General Advisory Committee of the United States Arms Control and Disarmament Agency during the Reagan Administration. In January, 2000, he was appointed by then-Speaker of the House Dennis Hastert to his current role on the National Commission for the Review of the National Reconnaissance Office.

Jacobs has been a director with the Convera Corporation since February 2002. He is a member of both its executive and compensation committees.

Jacobs has served on the boards of several technology start-ups since 2003, including The Water Company, LLC, headquartered in Pueblo, Colorado.

== Bibliography ==
- Frank, Peter H. & Rosenthal, David. "Orioles are sold: $70 million; Jacobs is quiet deal-maker," The Baltimore Sun, Wednesday, December 7, 1988.
- Baltimore Orioles 1990 Media Guide.
