= John Shoebridge Williams =

American civil engineer, cartographer, and spiritualist medium (1790–1878)

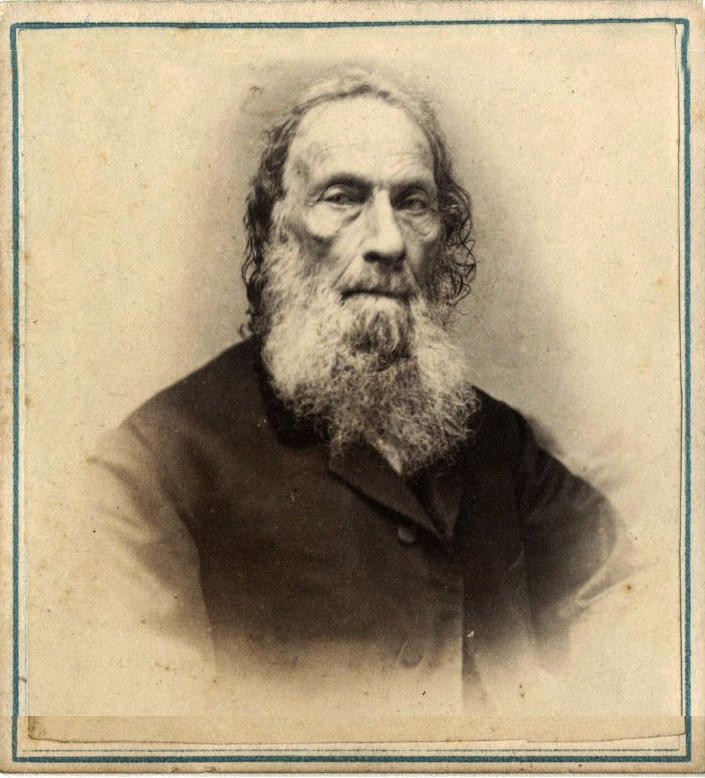
- Williams, c. 1867 (Indiana Album)
- Born: 1790; Black Creek, Carteret County, North Carolina, U.S.
- Died: 27 April 1878; Viola, Linn County, Iowa, U.S.
- Occupation: Civil engineer · cartographer · author · spiritualist medium
- Known for: Western summit survey, Chesapeake & Ohio Canal (1824–25)
- Notable work: History of the Invasion and Capture of Washington (1857)
- Spouse(s): Sarah W. Patterson (m. 1813, died) Drusilla Hampton (m. 1863; died 1870)

John Shoebridge Williams (1790 – 27 April 1878), also known as J. S. Williams, was an American civil engineer, surveyor-cartographer, militia staff officer, and later Spiritualist author. As brigade major and inspector of the District of Columbia militia’s First (Columbian) Brigade during the War of 1812, he took part in the Battle of Bladensburg and witnessed the burning of Washington. His memoir, "History of the Invasion and Capture of Washington" (1857), remains the earliest extended firsthand account of those events. After the war he joined the U.S. Board of Engineers for Internal Improvement (1824–25) and helped compile the profile sheets for the western-summit survey of the proposed Chesapeake & Ohio Canal. Williams later published regional maps, historical studies, and Spiritualist pamphlets that continue to serve scholars of early American infrastructure, religion, and coastal North Carolina communities.

== Early life ==
Williams was born in 1790 in the Quaker settlement at Black Creek (present-day Mill Creek), Carteret County, North Carolina.

He was the youngest surviving child of Robert Williams (1723–1790), a Welsh-born Quaker merchant-planter, and Robert’s second wife, Anne Shoebridge (d. 1845). Two full siblings-Samuel Williams and Elizabeth Williams Garretson, also reached adulthood, while an elder half-brother, Richard Williams, came from Robert’s first marriage to Elizabeth Dearman. Family records describe only rudimentary schooling, but by his early twenties, he was working as a chainman and draftsman on county surveys in eastern North Carolina.

== War of 1812 and the burning of Washington ==
In the summer of 1814, Williams held the post of brigade major and inspector on the staff of the First (or “Columbian”) Brigade of the District of Columbia militia. In that capacity he prepared morning reports, issued drill orders. He helped muster roughly 1,700 citizen-soldiers between mid-July and 20 August 1814.

On 24 August 1814, the brigade, under Brigadier General Walter Smith, formed the left wing of the American first line at the Battle of Bladensburg. British rockets and light infantry forced the militia to break; Williams rode along the pike attempting to rally companies, but the line disintegrated in what newspapers dubbed the “Bladensburg Races.” Brigade casualty returns compiled by Williams listed **26 killed and 51 wounded**, figures still cited by modern historians.

The defeat opened the road to the capital, and Williams, acting as staff courier, entered Washington ahead of the British column to alert civic authorities before flames consumed the Capitol and President’s House on the night of 24–25 August 1814.

Seeking to vindicate the militia’s performance, Williams published History of the Invasion and Capture of Washington (1857). The book integrates his wartime staff notes with official documents by Generals William H. Winder and Samuel Smith, making it the earliest extended first-hand narrative of the campaign. Later scholars such as Henry Adams and Anthony Pitch have relied on Williams’s casualty tables and day-by-day timetable of British movements.

== Chesapeake & Ohio Canal ==
In May 1824, the War Department formed three “brigades”, or survey parties, to examine routes over the Allegheny barrier for a tidewater–Ohio canal. The western brigade was placed under assistant engineer James Shriver, with four civilian aides: Jonathan Knight, John Shoebridge Williams, Freeman Lewis, and Joseph Shriver.

== Author and Spiritualist medium ==
After withdrawing from full-time engineering in the 1840s, Williams turned to writing and historical research. His most substantial book, "History of the Invasion and Capture of Washington" (Harper & Brothers, 1857), combined archival sources with personal accounts of the events during the War of 1812 and the burning of Washington.

Following the death of a daughter in 1851, Williams embraced Spiritualism. By February 1852, he was holding séances, recording “automatic writings,” and lecturing on spirit communication. His experiences drew academic attention as an early case of male mediumship. He self-published a pamphlet, A Synopsis of the Spiritual Manifestations of John S. Williams, Medium (1853).

== Personal life ==
Williams married Sarah W. Patterson on September 16, 1813; they had ten children. After Sarah’s death he married **Drusilla Hampton** (m. 1863, d. 1870). In later years, he lived with relatives near Viola, Linn County, Iowa, where he died on 27 April 1878, aged ≈88.

== Selected works ==
- History of the Invasion and Capture of Washington, and of the Events which Preceded and Followed (1857)
- Synopsis of the Spiritual Manifestations of John S. Williams, Medium (1853)
- Hand-drawn map of Quaker settlements, Carteret–Craven counties, North Carolina (1864)

== Legacy ==
Williams’s surviving work is cited in two distinct research fields.

- Primary narrative of the 1814 Bladensburg campaign – History of the Invasion and Capture of Washington (1857) remains the earliest extended first-hand account by an American staff participant. Major syntheses by Henry Adams, John K. Mahon, and Anthony Pitch rely on Williams’s casualty tables and hour-by-hour timetable to reconstruct the Battle of Bladensburg and the subsequent burning of Washington. The District of Columbia National Guard’s official history (2024) likewise adopts his staff returns as the authoritative strength-and-loss figures for the First Columbian Brigade.
- Regional historical and religious sources – Cultural geographers consult Williams’s 1864 manuscript map of Carteret and Craven County Quaker settlements to reconstruct late‑eighteenth‑century coastal‑Carolina communities. Historians of religion cite his séance diaries and 1853 pamphlet as early evidence of masculine identity formation within American Spiritualism.
