= Bobby Shriver =

American activist and attorney (born 1954)

- Shriver in 2007

Mayor of Santa Monica
- In office May 25, 2010 – December 7, 2010
- Preceded by: Pam O'Connor
- Succeeded by: Richard Bloom

Member of the Santa Monica City Council
- In office 2004–2012

Personal details
- Born: Robert Sargent Shriver III; April 28, 1954 (age 72) Chicago, Illinois, U.S.
- Party: Democratic
- Spouse: Malissa Feruzzi (m. 2005)
- Children: 2
- Parent(s): Sargent Shriver; Eunice Kennedy
- Relatives: Shriver family Kennedy family
- Education: Yale University (BA, JD)
- Occupation: Activist, attorney, journalist, politician

Robert Sargent Shriver III (born April 28, 1954) is an American activist, attorney, and journalist. He was a member of the Santa Monica City Council from 2004 to 2012, serving as mayor pro tem in 2006 and as mayor during part of 2010. A member of the prominent Shriver and Kennedy families, he is a nephew of former U.S. President John F. Kennedy, and former U.S. senators Robert F. Kennedy and Edward M. "Ted" Kennedy.

== Early life and education ==
Shriver was born in Chicago, Illinois, to Sargent Shriver (1915—2011) and Eunice Kennedy Shriver (1921—2009), the first of their five children. His siblings are Maria (born 1955), Timothy (born 1959), Mark (born 1964) and Anthony (born 1965).

Bobby attended Yale University in New Haven, Connecticut, where he was a member of the Scroll and Key Society. He graduated with a B.A. in American studies with cum laude honors. He graduated from Yale Law School with a J.D. in 1981.

== Business career and philanthropy ==
After graduating from law school, Shriver clerked for a year for Judge Stephen R. Reinhardt at the U.S. Court of Appeals for the Ninth Circuit, which is headquartered in San Francisco, California.

He then moved to New York City to work in a venture capital business at James D. Wolfensohn, Inc.

Along with father Sarge, Eli Jacobs, and Larry Lucchino, Bobby was an investor from 1989 to 1993 in the Baltimore Orioles, a professional-baseball team based in Baltimore, Maryland.

Shriver is an attorney. He is also president of RSS Inc., a Beverly Hills, California music, film and philanthropic company. (The letters RSS are Shriver's initials.)

In 1987, he produced a prime-time television feature about the Special Olympics, an organization for disabled young people and founded by his mother in 1968. This and subsequent productions have raised in excess of US$55 million for the Special Olympics program.

He has also produced several films, including True Lies (1994), which starred Arnold Schwarzenegger – his then brother-in-law.

In 2002, Shriver was a co-founder – with U2 lead singer Bono – of DATA (Debt, AIDS, Trade in Africa), a multinational, non-government organization whose purpose is to obtain social equality and justice for Africa through debt relief; adjust trade rules which burden Africa; eliminate the African AIDS epidemic; and strengthen democracy with more accountability by the wealthiest nations and African leaders with transparency towards the people.

With Shriver's involvement, DATA, in turn, was one of the founding organizations in 2004 of the ONE Campaign, a U.S.-based, non-partisan, non-profit organization which aims to increase U.S. government funding for and effectiveness of international-aid programs.

In 2006, he and Bono also co-founded (RED) to bring the world's biggest companies into the fight against AIDS and generate money for The Global Fund to Fight AIDS, Tuberculosis and Malaria. To date, (RED) has generated over $700M and impacted over 245 million lives.

Shriver also served as a producer of the 2023 film The Burial, starring Tommy Lee Jones, Jamie Foxx, and Jurnee Smollett.

== Political career ==
=== California State Parks and Recreation Commission ===
After Schwarzenegger became the Governor of California in 2003, he reappointed Shriver as chairman of the California State Park and Recreation Commission overseeing the state's parks and gardens. He had first been appointed by prior California Governor Gray Davis.

In 2005, Shriver, the commission chairman, and Clint Eastwood, the commission vice chairman, led a commission panel in its unanimous opposition to a six-lane, 16-mile (26 km) toll road that would cut through San Onofre State Beach (north of San Diego) that includes Trestles, a collection of surfing spots – one of Southern California's most-cherished. Shriver and Eastwood also supported a 2006 lawsuit to block the toll road and urged the California Coastal Commission to reject the project, which it did in February 2008.

In March 2008, Shriver and Eastwood, whose terms had expired, were not reappointed. The Natural Resources Defense Council (NRDC) asked for a legislative investigation into the decision not to re-appoint Shriver and Eastwood, citing their opposition to the toll-road extension.

Schwarzenegger's press release appointing Alice Huffman and Lindy DeKoven to replace Shriver and Eastwood makes no mention of a reason for the commission change.

=== Santa Monica City Council ===
In November 2004 Shriver ran for, and was elected to, a seat on the Santa Monica City Council. He stated that he decided to run for the seat after a dispute with the city over the height of the hedges at his home. He was one of thirteen candidates for four at-large council seats and received 23,260 votes, or 16.5 percent, of the vote. The other three winning candidates received 16,710, 14,475, and 13,408 votes.

He ran for re-election in 2008, again in a race in which thirteen candidates were running for four open seats. He again received the most votes, although he won by a smaller margin over the candidate receiving the second-most votes. Shriver received 24,298 votes, or 18.56 percent of the vote. The other three winning candidates received 20,232, 19,145, and 17,202 votes. Shriver's second term ended November 2012.

In March 2009 Shriver was reported to be considering becoming a candidate in the 2010 California Attorney General election. He did not run, and Kamala Harris, the Democratic candidate, was elected Attorney General.

=== Candidacy for Los Angeles County Supervisor ===
On January 21, 2014, the Los Angeles Times reported that Shriver launched his campaign for Los Angeles County supervisor. Shriver was defeated by former state senator Sheila Kuehl.

== Personal life ==
Shriver was romantically linked to Princess Caroline of Monaco in the 1970s. In 1989 he had an affair with married director Sondra Locke, who was 10 years his senior. He was dating Lauren Bessette, older sister of Carolyn Bessette Kennedy, the wife of his cousin John F. Kennedy Jr., at the time of their 1999 deaths. Lauren had joined JFK Jr. and Carolyn in his private plane to spend time with Bobby Shriver, along with other friends, on Martha's Vineyard that weekend.

He married Malissa Feruzzi on May 7, 2005. They have one daughter, Rosemary Scarlett Shriver (b. 2009). Shriver has a stepdaughter, Natasha Hunt Lee (b. 1997), from his wife's previous marriage.

== Awards ==
In 2007, Shriver received The Advertising Club's Silver Medal Award—also known as the Advertising Person of the Year Award—for his work with (RED). The annual award recognizes those who have made outstanding contributions to the advertising industry, furthering industry standards, demonstrating creative excellence and responsibility in areas of social concern.

In February 2008, he was honored with amfAR, The Foundation for AIDS's Award of Courage for his outstanding contribution to HIV/AIDS research and awareness.

== See also ==
- Kennedy family
- DATA
- ONE Campaign
- (Product) Red
