= Mark Kennedy Shriver =

American politician and member of the Kennedy family (born 1964)

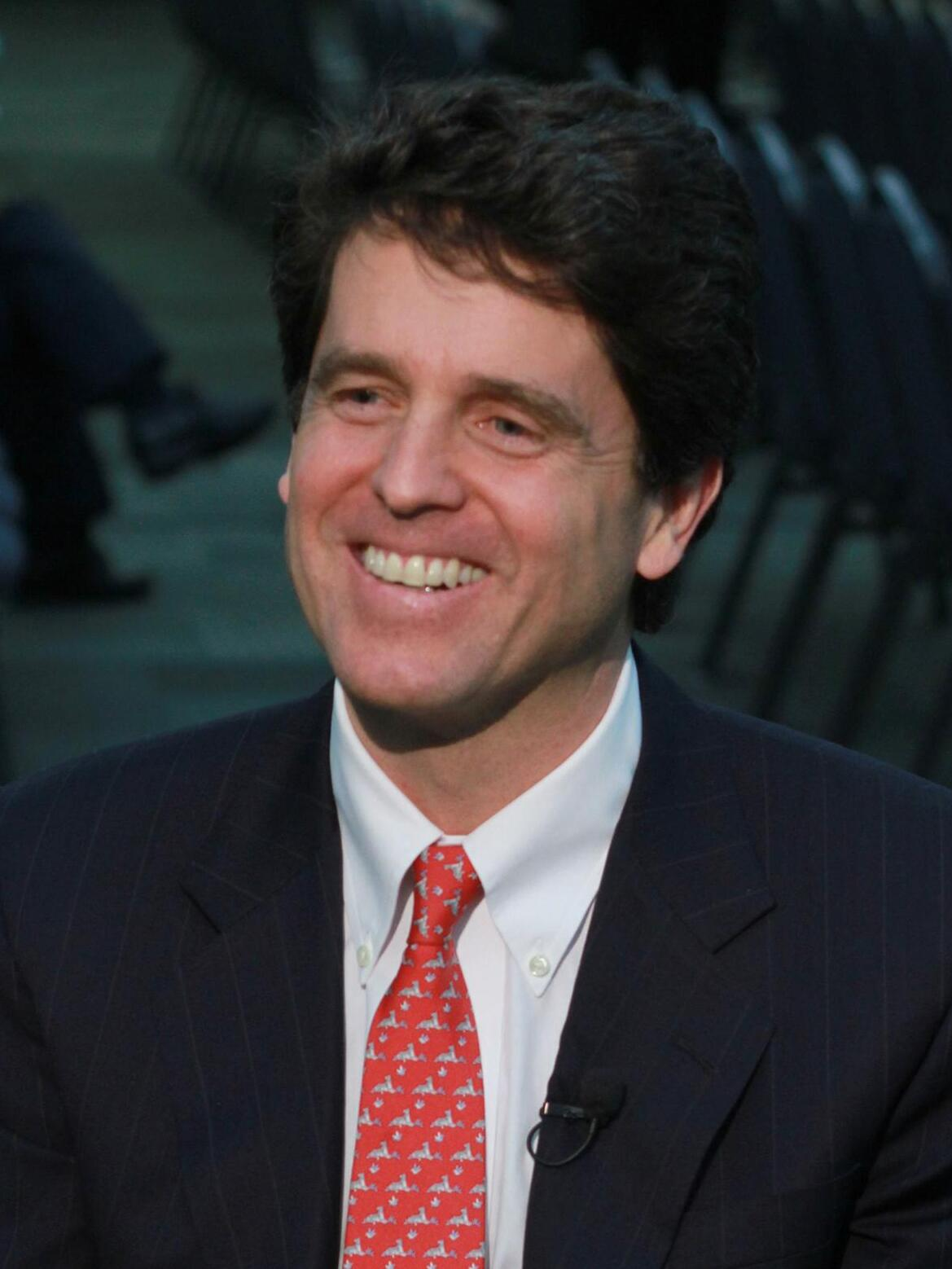
- Shriver in 2013

Member of the Maryland House of Delegates from the 15th district
- In office 1995 – January 8, 2003
- Succeeded by: Brian Feldman; Kathleen Dumais

Personal details
- Born: Mark Kennedy Shriver; February 17, 1964 (age 62) Washington, D.C., U.S.
- Party: Democratic
- Spouse: Jeanne Ripp (m. 1992)
- Children: 3
- Parent(s): Sargent Shriver (father); Eunice Kennedy Shriver (mother)
- Relatives: Shriver family Kennedy family
- Education: College of the Holy Cross (BA); Harvard University (MPA)

Mark Kennedy Shriver (born February 17, 1964) is an American politician. A member of the prominent Kennedy and Shriver families, he served as a Democratic member of the Maryland House of Delegates for two consecutive terms from 1995 to 2003.

Shriver has been the president of Save the Children Action Network, the political advocacy wing of the international non-governmental organization Save the Children. He also served as the Senior Vice President of U.S. Programs & Advocacy of Save the Children from 2003 until 2013. He is currently the president of Don Bosco Cristo Rey High School in Takoma Park, Maryland.

== Early life and education ==
Shriver was born in Washington, D.C., on February 17, 1964. His father, the diplomat Sargent Shriver, was a member of the Shriver family who served as the U.S. Ambassador to France from 1968 to 1970 and was the running mate of George McGovern in the 1972 presidential election. His mother, the philanthropist Eunice Mary Kennedy, was a member of the prominent Kennedy family. He has four siblings: Timothy, Maria, Bobby, and Anthony. Just before his birth, his uncle, U.S. president John F. Kennedy, was assassinated in 1963. At the time of his birth, his father was appointed as the new director of the Office of Economic Opportunity. His godfather is former professional tennis player Donald Dell.

As a child, Shriver spent summers at Hyannis Port, Massachusetts. Like his brothers, he began attending preparatory school at St. Albans School, then attended Georgetown Preparatory School in North Bethesda, Maryland, graduating in 1982. During summers, he worked as an assistant for the Baltimore Orioles under Edward Bennett Williams. In the fall of 1982, Shriver enrolled at the College of the Holy Cross in Worcester, Massachusetts—the first in his family to attend a Catholic college.

As an undergraduate at Holy Cross, Shriver played competitive rugby and spent a junior semester abroad in London, England. He was college roommates with future Catholic prelate William Draper Byrne, who became a close friend. During his senior year at Holy Cross, he wrote a thesis on Lyndon B. Johnson under John Anderson, the mayor of Worcester, and attended a silent retreat with Jesuit priests which he later described as "one of the most peaceful, rewarding, and enriching events of my life". He graduated from Holy Cross with a Bachelor of Arts in history in 1986. In 1993, he earned a Master of Public Administration (M.P.A.) from Harvard University.

== Career ==
From 1989 to 1994, he was a member of the Maryland Juvenile Justice Advisory Council. Starting in 1991, he also served on the board of directors of the Public Justice Center. From 1991 to 1992, he served on the Maryland Governor's Task Force on Alternative Sanctions to Incarceration. From 1994 to 1995, he served on the Maryland Governor's Commission on Service.

In 1994, he was elected to the Maryland House of Delegates, the lower house of the Maryland state legislature, representing Montgomery County, Maryland, District 15, and was reelected in 1998. He did not seek reelection in 2002 and was succeeded in that post by Brian Feldman.

In addition to serving as a delegate, he worked on the Task Force on the Maryland Prepaid-Tuition Savings Program in 1996, and on the Task Force to Study the Governance, Coordination, and Funding of the University System of Maryland from 1998 to 1999. He was a Founder and Executive Director of The Choice Program, an at-risk youth intervention project of the Shriver Center at University of Maryland, Baltimore County established in 1987. He then served on the Advisory Board on After-School Opportunity Programs from 1999 to 2003. From 2000 to 2001, he served on the Judith P. Hoyer Blue Ribbon Commission on Early Child Care and Education.

In 2002, he ran for U.S. Representative from the 8th Congressional District of Maryland, but was defeated in the Democratic primary by Chris Van Hollen. Van Hollen received 43.5% of the vote to Shriver's 40.6%.

Shriver joined Save the Children in 2003, serving as Senior Vice President for U.S. Programs until 2013. In that capacity, he created and oversaw the agency's early childhood education, literacy, health, and emergency preparedness and response programs in the United States.

As president of Save the Children Action Network, he is working to build bipartisan political will to increase access to early-childhood education in the United States and to end preventable deaths of mothers and children around the world. Shriver told The Washington Post in 2016: "We're actually engaged in elections, and we're trying to support candidates who are good on [kids'] issues. And we're going to try and defeat those who aren't. So we want to be the NRA for kids. We want to be a movement, but we want to have political juice as well."

In 2021, Shriver became the President of Don Bosco Cristo Rey High School. He is the school's first lay president.

== Personal life ==
On June 26, 1992, Shriver married Jeanne Ripp (born 1965), a former classmate at the College of the Holy Cross. Shriver resides in Bethesda, Maryland, with his wife Jeanne and their three children: Mary Elizabeth “Molly” Shriver (b. 1998), Thomas “Tommy” Kennedy Shriver (b. 1999), and Emma Rose Shriver (b. 2005).

Mark Shriver has written a memoir about his father, A Good Man: Rediscovering My Father, Sargent Shriver. In 2013, Shriver won a Christopher Award for the book. In 2016, he wrote a second book, Pilgrimage: My Search for the Real Pope Francis.

== Awards and honors ==
- Honorary Doctorate, La Roche College, 2016.
- Honorary Doctorate, Seattle University, 2015.
- Honorary Doctorate, Wheelock College, 2013.
- Honorary Doctorate, College of the Holy Cross, 2010.
- Honorary Doctorate, Loyola College in Maryland, 1994.
- Legislative Sponsor Award, Maryland Children's Action Network, 1999, 2000, 2001.
- Environmental Leadership Award, Maryland League of Conservation Voters, 1999, 2000, 2001.
- Leadership Award, Maryland Alliance of Boys and Girls Clubs, 2001.
- Award of Excellence, Mothers Against Drunk Driving, 2002.
- Outstanding Legislative Leadership Award, The Arc of Maryland, 2002.
- Father of the Year Award, Mother's Day/Father's Day Council, 2008.
