= Eunice Kennedy Shriver =

American philanthropist (1921–2009)

Eunice Kennedy Shriver DSG
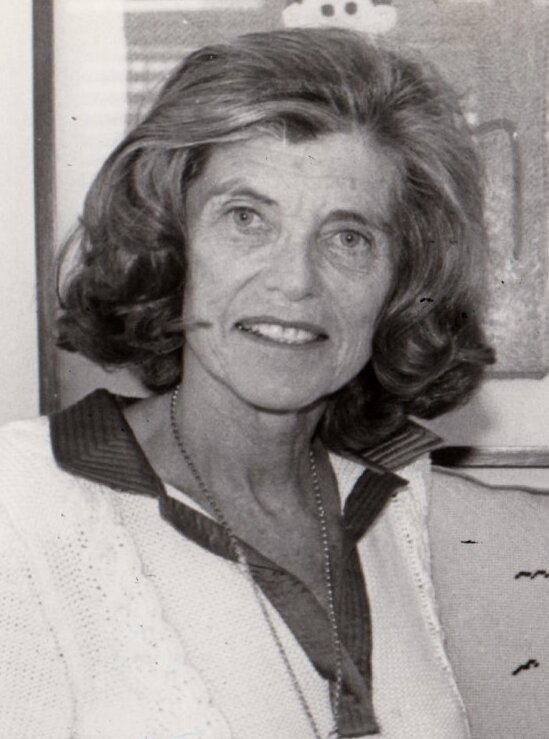
- Shriver in 1982
- Born: Eunice Mary Kennedy; July 10, 1921; Brookline, Massachusetts, U.S.
- Died: August 11, 2009 (aged 88); Hyannis, Massachusetts, U.S.
- Burial place: St. Francis Xavier Parish Cemetery, Centerville, Massachusetts
- Education: Stanford University (BS)
- Political party: Democratic
- Spouse: Sargent Shriver (m. 1953)
- Children: Bobby; Maria; Timothy; Mark; Anthony
- Parents: Joseph P. Kennedy Sr.; Rose Fitzgerald
- Relatives: Kennedy family (by birth); Shriver family (by marriage); Arnold Schwarzenegger (son-in-law)
- Website: eunicekennedyshriver.org

Eunice Mary Kennedy Shriver (née Kennedy; July 10, 1921 – August 11, 2009) was an American philanthropist. Shriver was a member of the Kennedy family by birth and a member of the Shriver family through her marriage to Sargent Shriver, who was United States ambassador to France and the final Democratic nominee for vice president of the United States in 1972. She was a sister of U.S. president John F. Kennedy, U.S. Attorney General Robert F. Kennedy, and U.S. Senator Ted Kennedy, and U.S. Ambassador to Ireland Jean Kennedy Smith.

Shriver was instrumental in founding the Special Olympics, a sports organization conceived for persons with intellectual disabilities. For her efforts on behalf of disabled people, she was awarded the Presidential Medal of Freedom in 1984.

== Early life, education, and early career ==
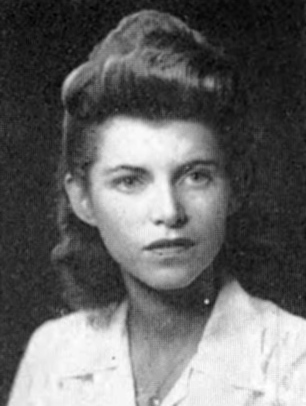
Kennedy in the Stanford University yearbook, 1943

Eunice Mary Kennedy was born in Brookline, Massachusetts, on July 10, 1921. She was the fifth of nine children of Joseph P. Kennedy Sr. and Rose Fitzgerald. Her siblings were U.S. president and senator John F. Kennedy, U.S. attorney general and U.S. senator Robert F. Kennedy, U.S. senator Edward Kennedy, and U.S. ambassador to Ireland Jean Kennedy Smith.

She studied at Stanford University, where she competed on the swimming and track and field teams. After graduating from Stanford in 1943 with a Bachelor of Science in sociology, she moved to Washington, D.C., and worked for the Special War Problems Division of the U.S. State Department. Kennedy eventually moved to the U.S. Justice Department as executive secretary for a project dealing with juvenile delinquency. During her time in Washington, she shared a townhouse in Georgetown with her brother John, then a U.S. congressman. Kennedy served as a social worker at the Federal Industrial Institution for Women for one year before moving to Chicago in 1951 to work with the House of the Good Shepherd women's shelter and Chicago Juvenile Court.

== Charity work and awards ==
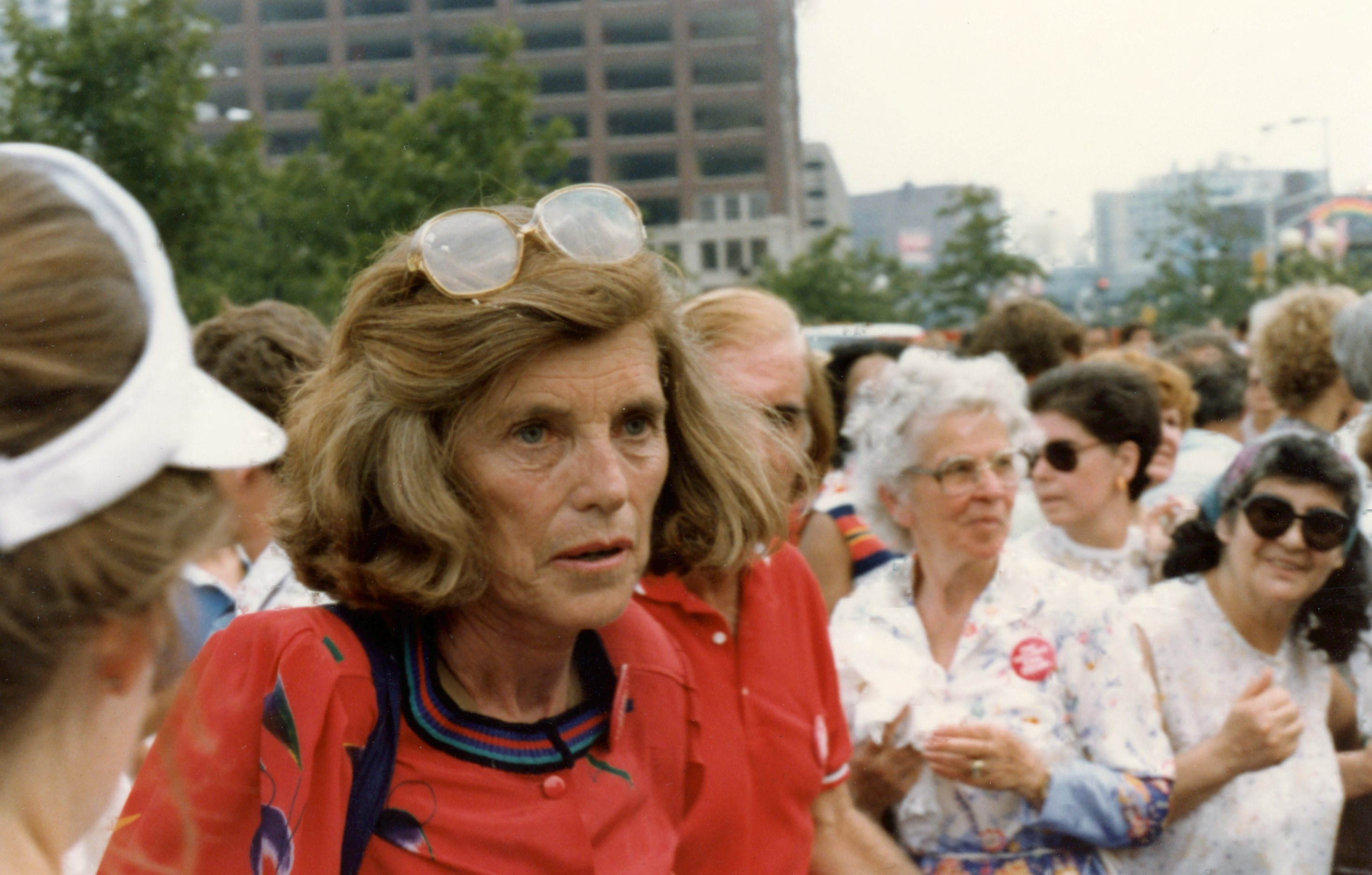
Shriver in 1980

In 2008, the National Institute of Child Health and Human Development was renamed in honor of Shriver.

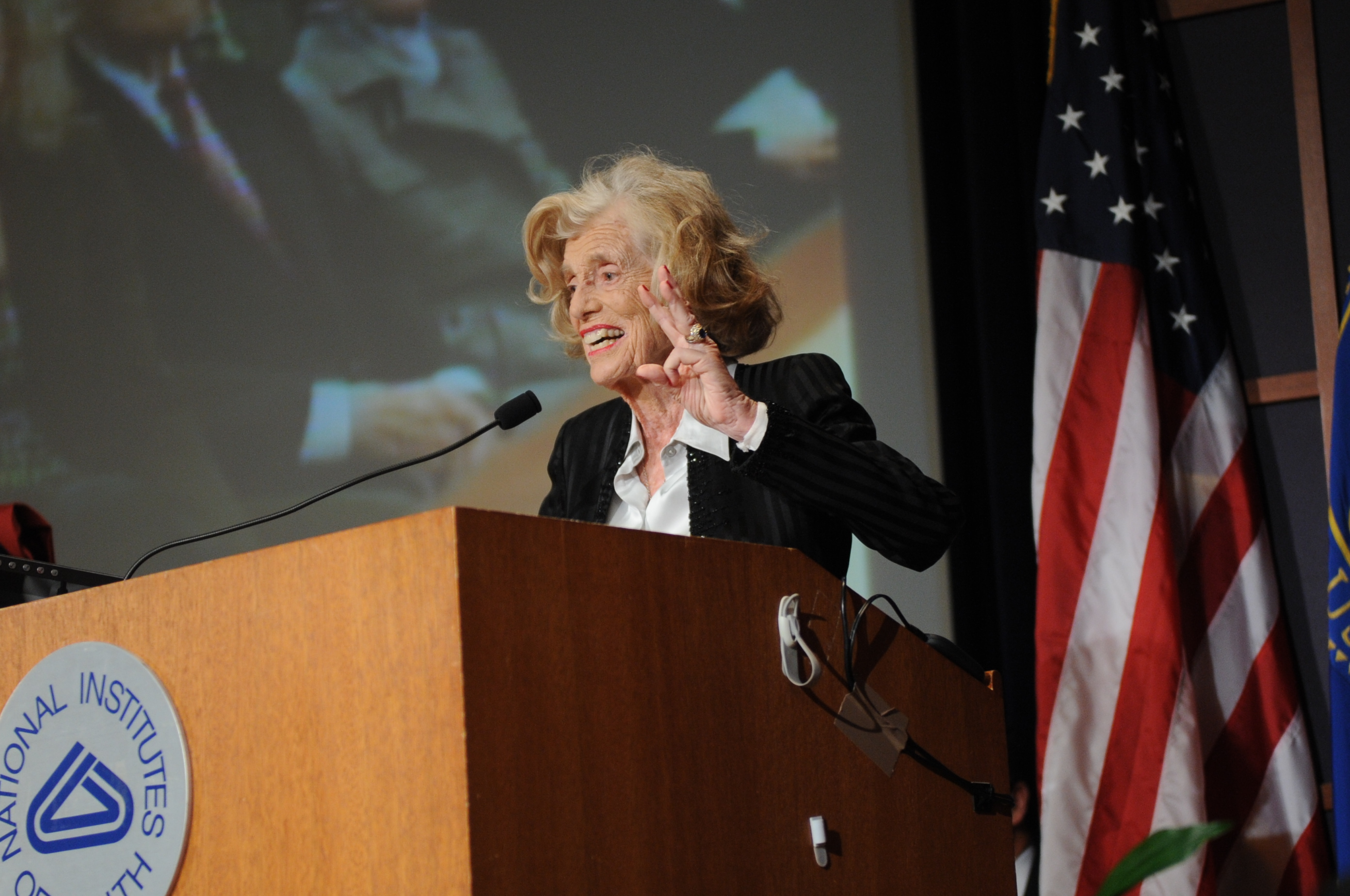
Shriver speaks at March 3, 2008, ceremony in her honor

Shriver became executive vice president of the Joseph P. Kennedy Jr. Foundation in 1957. She shifted the organization's focus from Catholic charities to research on the causes of intellectual disabilities and humane ways to treat them. That interest eventually culminated in, among other things, the Special Olympics movement.

A longtime advocate for children's health and disability issues, Shriver championed creation of the President's Panel on Mental Retardation in 1961. The panel was significant in the movement from institutionalization to community integration in the United States and throughout the world. Shriver was a key founder of the National Institute of Child Health and Human Development (NICHD), a part of the National Institutes of Health in 1962.

In 1962, Shriver founded at her Maryland farm Camp Shriver, a summer day camp for children and adults with intellectual disabilities to explore their capabilities in a variety of sports and physical activities. From that camp came the concept of Special Olympics. Shriver founded the Special Olympics in 1968. That year, the Joseph P. Kennedy Jr. Foundation helped plan and fund the First International Special Olympics Summer Games, held in Chicago's Soldier Field, where 1,000 athletes with intellectual disabilities from 26 states and Canada competed. In her speech at the opening ceremony, Shriver said, "The Chicago Special Olympics prove a very fundamental fact, the fact that exceptional children — mentally disabled children — can be exceptional athletes, the fact that through sports they can realize their potential for growth." Special Olympics Inc. was established as a nonprofit charity in 1968; since then, nearly 3 million athletes have participated.

In 1969, Shriver moved to France and pursued her interest in intellectual disability there. She started organizing small activities with Paris organizations, mostly reaching out to families of kids who had special needs to provide activities for them, thereby laying the foundation for a robust international expansion of the Special Olympics in the late 1970s and 1980s.

In 1982, Shriver founded the Eunice Kennedy Shriver National Center for Community of Caring at University of Utah, Salt Lake City. The center is a "grades K-12, whole school, comprehensive character education program with a focus on disabilities... adopted by almost 1,200 schools nationwide and in Canada".

Shriver was awarded the nation's highest civilian award, the Presidential Medal of Freedom, in 1984 by U.S. President Ronald Reagan for her work on behalf of persons with disabilities. In 1988, she received the Laetare Medal, considered the highest award for American Catholics, from the University of Notre Dame. In 1990 Shriver was awarded the Eagle Award from the United States Sports Academy. The Eagle Award is the academy's highest international honor and was awarded to Shriver for her significant contributions to international sport.

In 1992, Shriver received the Senator John Heinz Award for Greatest Public Service Benefiting the Disadvantaged, an award given out annually by the Jefferson Awards for Public Service.

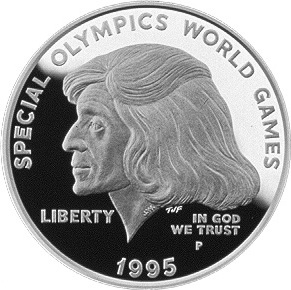
Shriver is featured on the 1995 Special Olympics World Games silver dollar.

For her work in nationalizing the Special Olympics, Shriver received the Civitan International World Citizenship Award. Her advocacy on this issue also earned her other awards and recognitions, including honorary degrees from numerous universities. She is the second American and the only woman to appear on a U.S. coin while still living. Her portrait is on the obverse of the 1995 commemorative silver dollar honoring the Special Olympics. On the reverse is a quotation attributed to Shriver: "As we hope for the best in them, hope is reborn in us."

In 1998, Shriver was inducted into the National Women's Hall of Fame.

Shriver received the 2002 Theodore Roosevelt Award (the Teddy), an annual award given by the National Collegiate Athletic Association to a graduate from an NCAA member institution who earned a varsity letter in college for participation in intercollegiate athletics and who ultimately became a distinguished citizen of national reputation based on outstanding life accomplishment. In addition to the Teddy recognition, she was selected in 2006 as part of the NCAA Centennial celebration as one of the 100 most-influential individuals in its first century; she was listed ninth. In 2006, she received a papal knighthood from Pope Benedict XVI, being made a Dame of the Order of St. Gregory the Great (DSG). Her mother had been created a papal countess in 1950 by Pope Pius XII.

In 2008, she received the Foremother Award from the National Center for Health Research for her lifetime achievements.

In 2008, the U.S. Congress changed the NICHD's name to the Eunice Kennedy Shriver National Institute of Child Health and Human Development. In December 2008, Sports Illustrated named Shriver the first recipient of Sportsman of the Year Legacy Award. On May 9, 2009, the Smithsonian Institution's National Portrait Gallery (NPG) in Washington, D.C., unveiled an historic portrait of her, the first portrait the NPG ever commissioned of an individual who had not served as a U.S. president or First Lady. The portrait depicts her with four Special Olympics athletes (including Loretta Claiborne) and one Best Buddies participant. It was painted by David Lenz, winner of the Outwin Boochever Portrait Competition in 2006. As part of the Portrait Competition prize, the NPG commissioned a work from the winning artist to depict a living subject for the collection. Lenz, whose son, Sam, has Down syndrome and is an enthusiastic Special Olympics athlete, was inspired by Shriver's dedication to working with people with intellectual disabilities.

Shriver became involved with Dorothy Hamill's special skating program in the Special Olympics after Hamill's Olympic Games ice-skating win. In September 2010, the State University of New York at Brockport, home of the 1979 Special Olympics, renamed its football stadium the Eunice Kennedy Shriver Stadium.

In July 2017, Shriver posthumously received the Arthur Ashe Courage Award at the 2017 ESPY Awards.

== Political involvement ==
Shriver actively campaigned for her elder brother John during his successful 1960 U.S. presidential election.

Although Shriver was a Democrat, she was a vocal supporter of the anti-abortion movement. In 1990, Shriver wrote a letter to The New York Times denouncing an abortion rights group for having used a quotation of President Kennedy's words out of context in support of the group's position. Shriver was one of several prominent Democrats, including Governor Robert P. Casey of Pennsylvania and Bishop Austin Vaughan of New York, who took out a full-page New York Times advertisement opposing abortion on demand during the 1992 Democratic Convention (the party adopted a 1992 platform that emphasized its support for abortion rights). Shriver was a supporter of several anti-abortion organizations: Feminists for Life of America, the Susan B. Anthony List, and Democrats for Life of America.

Despite being a Democrat, Shriver supported her Republican son-in-law Arnold Schwarzenegger's successful 2003 Governor of California election.

On January 28, 2008, aged 86, Shriver was present at American University in Washington, D.C., when her brother U.S. Senator Edward M. Kennedy announced his endorsement of Barack Obama's 2008 Democratic U.S. presidential campaign.

== Personal life ==
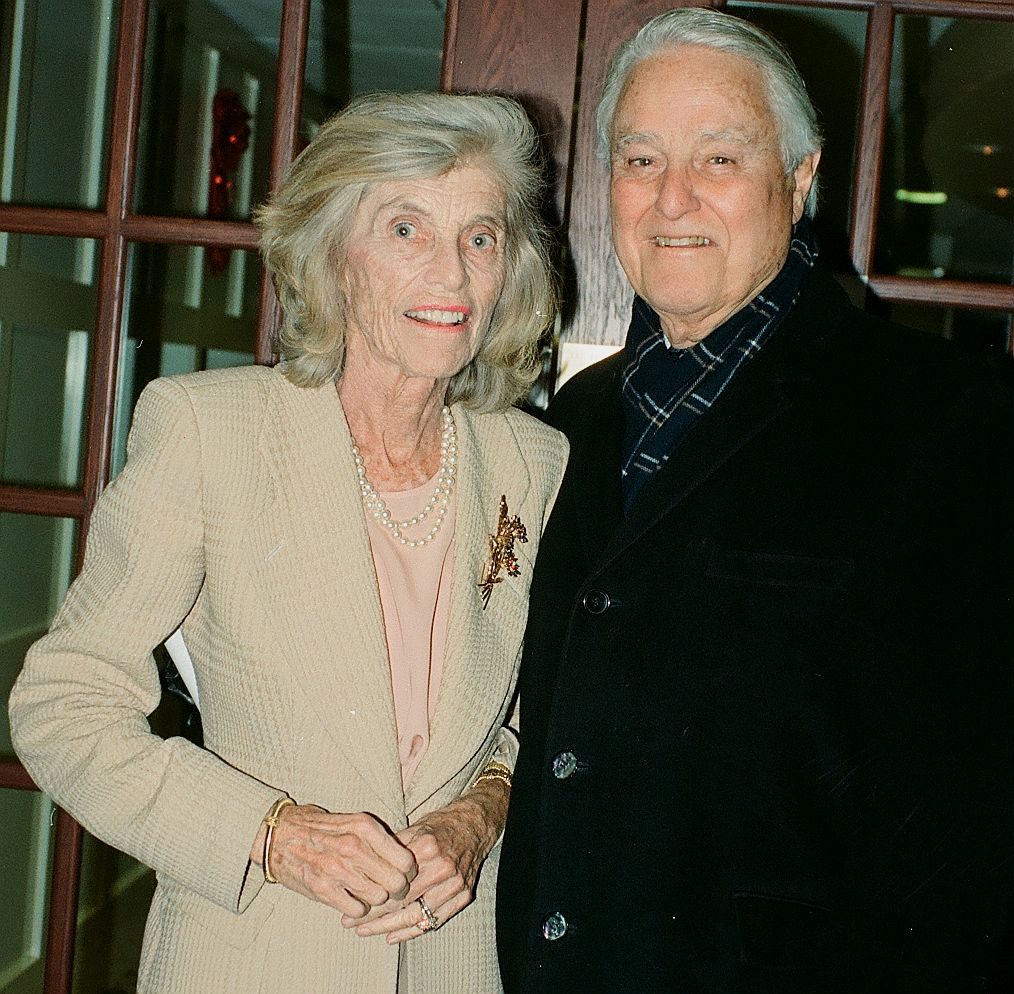
Shriver and husband, Sargent, in 1999

On May 23, 1953, aged 31, Shriver married Sargent Shriver in a Roman Catholic ceremony at Saint Patrick's Cathedral in New York City. Her husband served as U.S. ambassador to France from 1968 to 1970 and was the 1972 Democratic U.S. vice presidential candidate (with George McGovern as the candidate for U.S. President). They had five children: Robert Sargent Shriver III, Maria Owings Shriver (Schwarzenegger), Timothy Perry Shriver, Mark Kennedy Shriver, and Anthony Paul Kennedy Shriver. Shriver had nineteen grandchildren at the time of her death.

She had a close relationship with her sister Rosemary Kennedy, who was intellectually disabled and who became incapacitated due to a lobotomy. Shriver suffered a stroke and broken hip in 2005. On November 18, 2007, aged 86, she was admitted to Massachusetts General Hospital in Boston, where she spent several weeks.

== Death ==
On August 7, 2009, Shriver was admitted to Cape Cod Hospital in Hyannis, Massachusetts with an undisclosed ailment. On August 10, her relatives were called to the hospital. She died at the hospital the next day at the age of 88, two weeks before her brother Senator Ted Kennedy died on August 25, 2009, at the age of 77.

Shriver's family issued a statement upon her death, reading in part:

Inspired by her love of God, her devotion to her family, and her relentless belief in the dignity and worth of every human life, she worked without ceasing—searching, pushing, demanding, hoping for change. She was a living prayer, a living advocate, a living center of power. She set out to change the world and to change us, and she did that and more. She founded the movement that became Special Olympics, the largest movement for acceptance and inclusion for people with intellectual disabilities in the history of the world. Her work transformed the lives of hundreds of millions of people across the globe, and they in turn are her living legacy.

President Barack Obama remarked after Shriver's death that she was "an extraordinary woman who, as much as anyone, taught our nation—and our world—that no physical or mental barrier can restrain the power of the human spirit."

=== Funeral and burial ===
On August 14, 2009, an invitation-only Requiem Mass was celebrated for Shriver at St. Francis Xavier Roman Catholic Church in Hyannis. Following the Requiem Mass, she was buried at the St. Francis Xavier parish cemetery in nearby Centerville, Massachusetts. Pope Benedict XVI sent a letter of condolence to her family. Because her brother Ted had terminal brain cancer, he was unable to attend the funeral, and their sister Jean Kennedy Smith stayed with him. Ted died two weeks later, leaving Jean as the sole surviving child of Joseph and Rose Kennedy until her death on June 17, 2020, at the age of 92.

== See also ==
- Kennedy family
- Shriver family
- National Institute of Child Health and Human Development
- Special Olympics

Awards and achievements
Preceded by William Cohen	Theodore Roosevelt Award (NCAA); 2002	Succeeded by Donna de Varona
