= Union Mills Homestead Historic District =

Historic district in Maryland, United States

- U.S. National Register of Historic Places
- U.S. Historic district
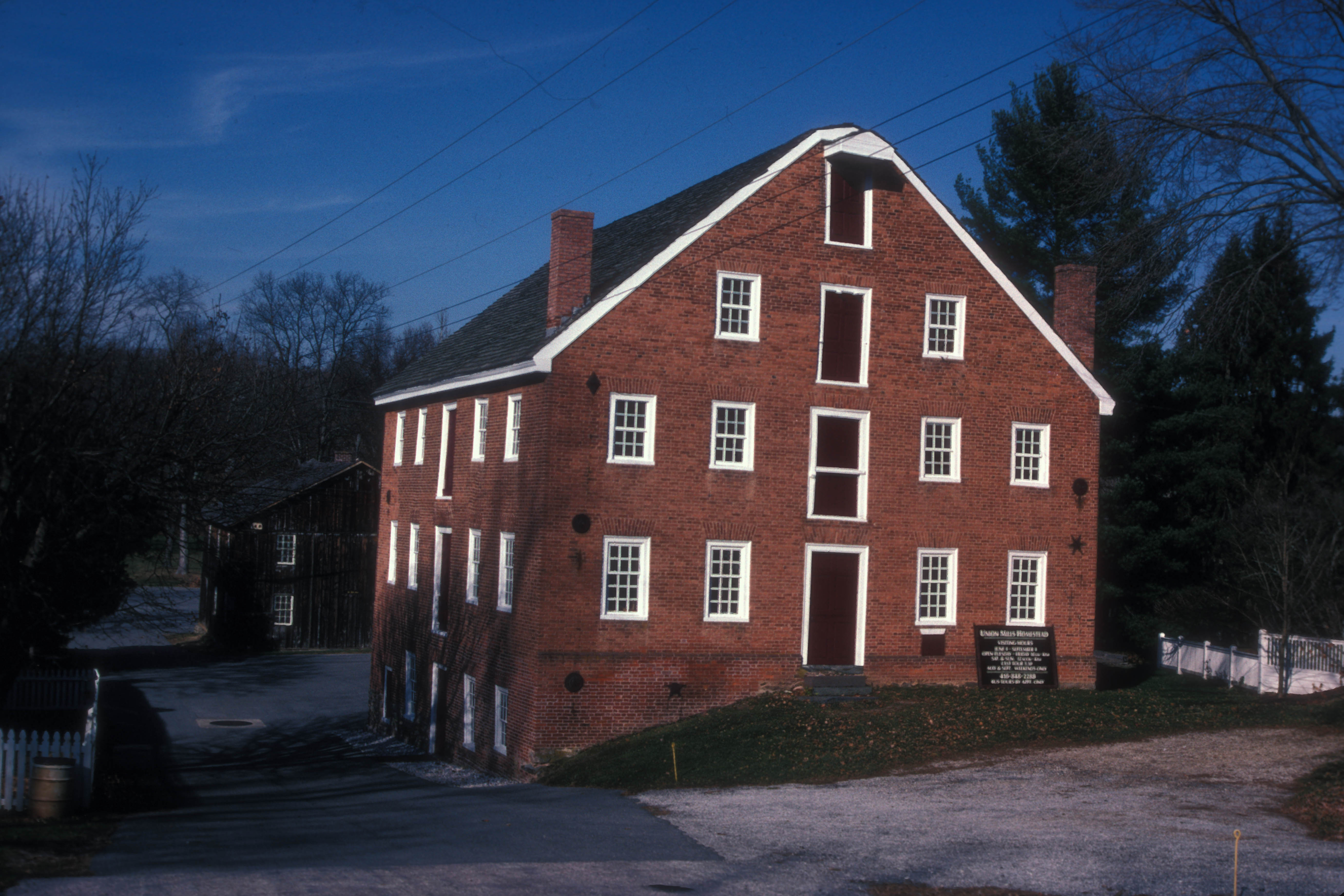
- in 1971

- Location within Maryland Location within the United States
- Location: Jct. of U.S. 140 and Deep Run Rd., Westminster, Maryland
- Coordinates: 39°40′14″N 77°0′58″W
- Area: 279 acres (113 ha)
- Built by: Shriver, Andrew; Schriver, David
- NRHP reference No.: 71000371
- Added to NRHP: January 25, 1971

Union Mills Homestead Historic District is a national historic district at Westminster, Carroll County, Maryland, United States.

== Description ==
The homestead comprises a dwelling house, a brick grist mill, a surviving bark shed from the 19th century tannery complex, a reconstructed tannery barn, and a Bollman-design bridge.

== History ==
The Shriver Homestead was built in 1797 by Andrew and David Shriver and has been continually occupied by the family. The mill, also built in 1797, is a large brick structure, built of locally manufactured brick laid in both Flemish bond and common bond. On June 30, 1863, General J.E.B. Stuart of the Confederate Army of Northern Virginia camped at Union Mills and was hosted by part of the Shriver family. On the following day, General James Barnes of the 5th Corps of the Army of the Potomac arrived on the site and welcomed and entertained by other members of the family.

Union Mills was added to the National Register of Historic Places in 1971.

The Union Mills Homestead was home to the Shriver family for 6 generations. It is currently a historic landmark located near Westminster, Maryland, about 17 miles south of Gettysburg, Pennsylvania. The Homestead is now a museum of American culture, operated by the Union Mills Homestead Foundation, a non-profit foundation with all proceeds dedicated to the preservation and restoration of the Union Mills Homestead Complex.

=== The building of the Shriver homestead ===
The following passage is excerpted from "Union Mills: The Shriver Homestead Since 1797" by Frederic Shriver Klein:

The Shriver brothers bought a large tract of land along Big Pipe Creek, about seven miles north of Westminster and along early roads leading into Littlestown and Pennsylvania's roads toward the west. The junction of Pipe Creek and Deep Run furnished a strong flow of water for a mill in the wide valley, and gentle slopes on either side provided land for grazing, farming or settlement. Heavy stands of black oak would furnish tanbark for a tannery, and the Shrivers knew a good bit about tanning leather. At this time, Andrew Shriver was operating a store and tavern in Littlestown, Pennsylvania, and David was practicing as a civil engineer in Maryland.
The original mill contract shows that on January 25, 1797, the two brothers completed arrangements with John Mong, a Frederick County millwright to construct "a set of mills," a grist mill and a saw mill. On March 13, Jacob Keefer and John Eckert contracted "to mould and burn a kiln of brick" for the mill, "providing 100,000 brick or more, to be paid for at the rate of one French crown for every thousand brick." The brick kiln was constructed near the creek, known in previous years as Pipeclay Creek.
The house had its origin on January 26 of the same year, when a contract was made with Henry Kohlstock of York County, Pennsylvania, for building a small double house as a residence for the two brothers. Kohlstock, a joiner, agreed "to finish two small houses 14 by 17 feet each, to be connected by a porch and passage about 10 feet wide." Each house had one upper and one lower room, with a connecting center hallway and a small porch in front, twelve by eight feet. The carpenter's bill for labor gives an interesting idea of costs in 1797:

- Lower floors for small house 5 dols.
- Upper floor, rough 3 dols.
- Windows, casing, frames and sash 2 dols. each
- Doors, casings, etc. 2 dols.each
- Weatherboarding, stairs, porch, cornice seats, washboards 3 dols.
- Painting 6 dols.

The total labor costs for the house came to eighty-six dollars!"
