= Jacob Shriver =

American politician

Member of the Maryland House of Delegates from the Frederick County district
- In office 1828–1828 Serving with George Bowlus, David Kemp, William S. McPherson
- Preceded by: Nicholas Holtz, David Kemp, Francis Thomas
- Succeeded by: Roderick Dorsey, John Kinzer, Isaac Shriver, Francis Thomas

Personal details
- Born: December 19, 1779 Frederick County, Maryland, U.S.
- Died: October 15, 1841 (aged 61)
- Spouse: Anna Eva Hupert (m. 1806)
- Children: 5
- Parent: David Shriver (father)
- Relatives: Isaac Shriver (brother); David Shriver Jr. (brother); Edward Shriver (nephew)
- Occupation: Politician; farmer

Jacob Shriver (December 19, 1779 – October 15, 1841) was an American politician from Maryland. He served as a member of the Maryland House of Delegates, representing Frederick County in 1828.

== Early life ==
Jacob Shriver was born on December 19, 1779, at Little Pipe Creek in Frederick County (later Carroll County), Maryland, to Rebecca (née Ferree) and David Shriver. His brothers were Isaac and David Jr.

== Career ==
Shriver served as a member of the Maryland House of Delegates, representing Frederick County, in 1828. He worked as a farmer.

== Personal life ==
Shriver married Anna Eva Hupert in 1806. They had five children, David Hupert, Abraham Feree, Mary Anna, Caroline Eltinge and Augustus. His nephew Edward Shriver served in the state legislature. Shriver was a member of the Reformed Church.

Shriver died on October 15, 1841.
