= Schreiber =

Schreiber may refer to:

== Companies ==
- Schreiber Foods, a dairy company
- Schreiber Furniture, a furniture manufacturer in the United Kingdom
- T. Schreiber Studio, an acting studio in New York City, US

== Places ==
- Schreiber, Ontario, a township in Canada
- Walther-Schreiber-Platz (Berlin U-Bahn), a German subway station

== Other uses ==
- Schreiber (surname)
- Paul D. Schreiber High School in Port Washington, New York, United States
- Polyura schreiber, a butterfly species
- Schreiber Diesels, an ice hockey team in Ontario, Canada
- Schreiber theory, a writer-centered approach to film criticism
- Schreibersite, a mineral
- Schreiber's fringe-fingered lizard
- Schreibers' long-fingered bat
- T. Schreiber Studio, an acting studio in New York City
