= Schrijver =

Schrijver means "writer" in Dutch. As a surname, it may refer to various people. See:

== Schrijver ==
- Alexander Schrijver (b. 1948), Dutch mathematician and computer scientist
- Isaq Schrijver (c. 1650 – c. 1706), Dutch explorer in South Africa
- Loretta Schrijver (1956–2025), Dutch television host
- Peter Schrijver (1576–1660), Dutch writer and scholar better known as "Petrus Scriverius"
- Peter Schrijver (b. 1963), Dutch linguist and Celtologist

== Skriver ==
- Ina Skriver (b. 1949), Danish actress and model
- Josephine Skriver (b. 1993), Danish model

== Schrijvers ==
- de:Petrus Hermanus Schrijvers (b. 1939), Dutch classical philologist (predominantly Latinist), also known as Piet Schrijvers
- Piet Schrijvers (1946–2022), Dutch football goalkeeper and manager
- Siebe Schrijvers (b. 1996), Belgian footballer

== De Schrijver ==
- de:Karel De Schrijver (1908–1992), Belgian composer, conductor and violinist
- Maurits De Schrijver (b. 1951), Belgian footballer
- Jean De Schryver (1916–unknown), Belgian boxer
