= Isaac Shriver =

American politician (1777–1856)

Member of the Maryland House of Delegates from the Frederick County district
- In office 1835–1836 Serving with Robert Annan, Daniel Duvall, William Willis
- Preceded by: Robert Annan, Francis Brengle, Daniel Duvall, William Roberts
- Succeeded by: George Bowlus, Francis Brengle, Joshua Doub, Jacob Matthias
- In office 1829–1829 Serving with Roderick Dorsey, John Kinzer, Francis Thomas
- Preceded by: George Bowlus, David Kemp, William S. McPherson, Jacob Shriver
- Succeeded by: David Kemp, John H. McElfresh, Evan McKinstry, Davis Richardson
- In office 1827–1827 Serving with Nicholas Holtz, David Kemp, Francis Thomas
- Preceded by: Samuel Barnes, John C. Cockey, William P. Farquhar, Alexander McIlhenny, Thomas Sappington
- Succeeded by: George Bowlus, David Kemp, William S. McPherson, Jacob Shriver
- In office 1811–1812 Serving with Thomas Jones, Joseph Swearingen, William Tyler
- Preceded by: Richard Brooke, Joshua Cockey, John Schley, Joseph Swearingen
- Succeeded by: Ignatius Davis, Joshua Delaplane, John Graham, Richard Potts

Personal details
- Born: March 6, 1777 near Westminster, Maryland, U.S.
- Died: December 22, 1856 (aged 79) Cumberland, Maryland, U.S.
- Resting place: Westminster, Maryland, U.S.
- Party: Democratic
- Spouse: Polly Leatherman (m. 1802)
- Children: 10
- Parent: David Shriver (father)
- Relatives: David Shriver Jr. (brother); Jacob Shriver (brother); Edward Shriver (nephew)
- Occupation: Politician; bank president

Isaac Shriver (March 6, 1777 – December 22, 1856) was an American politician from Maryland. He served as a member of the Maryland House of Delegates, representing Frederick County from 1811 to 1812, in 1827 and 1829, and from 1835 to 1836.

== Early life ==
Isaac Shriver was born on March 6, 1777, at the family homestead on Little Pipe Creek, near Westminster, Maryland, to Rebecca (née Ferree) and David Shriver. His brothers were David Jr. and Jacob.

== Career ==
Shriver was a Democrat. He served as a member of the Maryland House of Delegates, representing Frederick County from 1811 to 1812, in 1827 and in 1829, and from 1835 to 1836. In 1836, he ran again as a Democrat, but lost.

Shriver was president of the Bank of Winchester (later the Farmers' and Mechanics' Bank of Frederick County) from April 1827 to his death in 1856. The Shriver family worked in iron and built gun barrels for the government. He was an incorporator of Westminster Academy and a charter member of the Carroll division of the Sons of Temperance. He owned a tavern in Westminster that was later named Cassell Home and became the City Hotel and the Main Court Inn. He donated land used for the Carroll County courthouse in Westminster.

== Personal life ==
Shriver married Polly Leatherman, daughter of Henry Leatherman, on April 22, 1802. They had ten children, Rebecca, Henry, Betsy, George, Francis, Margaret, Julian, Jesse, Anna Maria and Louisa Susan. His nephew Edward Shriver served in the state legislature. Shriver was affiliated with the German Reformed church until 1834 when he joined the Methodist Protestant church. After his marriage, he moved to Westminster.

Shriver died on December 22, 1856, in Cumberland. He is buried in Westminster.
