= Edward Shriver =

American politician (1812–1896)

Member of the Maryland House of Delegates from the Frederick County district
- In office 1843–1844 Serving with Edward Buckey, William Lynch, David W. Naill, Otho Thomas, Daniel S. Biser, William Cost Johnson, Thomas E. D. Poole, John H. Worthington
- Preceded by: Daniel S. Biser, Thomas Crampton, William Lynch, James J. McKeehan, Davis Richardson
- Succeeded by: Daniel S. Biser, Henry Boteler, Francis J. Hoover, Enoch Louis Lowe, George Zollinger

Personal details
- Born: December 8, 1812 Frederick, Maryland, U.S.
- Died: February 26, 1896 (aged 83) Baltimore, Maryland, U.S.
- Resting place: Frederick, Maryland, U.S.
- Spouse: Elizabeth Lydia Reigart (m. 1839; died 1860)
- Children: 6
- Relatives: David Shriver (grandfather); David Shriver Jr. (uncle); Isaac Shriver (uncle); Jacob Shriver (uncle); William Schley (cousin)
- Occupation: Politician; lawyer

Edward Shriver (December 8, 1812 – February 26, 1896) was an American politician from Maryland. He served as a member of the Maryland House of Delegates, representing Frederick County from 1843 to 1844.

== Early life ==
Edward Shriver was born on December 8, 1812, in Frederick, Maryland, to Ann Margaret (née Leatherman) and Abraham Shriver. His father was a judge. His grandfather was David Shriver. His uncles were Maryland politicians David Shriver Jr., Isaac Shriver and Jacob Shriver. He studied law with his cousin William Schley.

== Career ==
Shriver practiced law with his cousin William Schley. He served as a member of the Maryland House of Delegates, representing Frederick County from 1843 to 1844. He was a member of the convention for the Maryland Constitution of 1851. He was clerk of the circuit court of Frederick County from 1851 to 1857. He was member of the board of public works from 1862 to 1865. In 1865, he was appointed as postmaster of Baltimore by President Andrew Johnson and served from 1866 to 1869. He was register of the water department in Baltimore from 1882 until he resigned the role in December 1895.

Shriver supported the Union cause during the Civil War, but according to sources, did not service, despite being called "General Shriver". He was charter member and served as president of the Independent Hose Company No. 1 of Frederick for thirty years. He was president of Frederick College.

== Personal life ==
Shriver married Elizabeth Lydia Reigart on August 29, 1839. They had six children, Philip Abraham, Ann Albertine, Frederick Stover, Mary Margaret, Elizabeth Emiline and Ellenor Sallie. His wife died in 1860. He was a member of the Reformed Church. His daughter Ann married Lieutenant Colonel, John Almy Tompkins.

Shriver died on February 26, 1896, at his home at 1212 Linden Avenue in Baltimore. He was buried at the Shriver family plot on Bentz Street in Frederick.
