= David Shriver Jr. =

American politician and engineer (1769–1852)

Member of the Maryland House of Delegates from the Frederick County district
- In office 1807–1807 Serving with Benjamin Biggs, Thomas Hawkins, Henry Kuhn
- Preceded by: Benjamin Biggs, Thomas Hawkins, Henry Kuhn, Joab Waters
- Succeeded by: George Baer Jr., Francis Brown Sappington, John Thomas, John H. Thomas

Personal details
- Born: April 14, 1769 Frederick County, Maryland, U.S.
- Died: April 28, 1852 (aged 83) Cumberland, Maryland, U.S.
- Spouse: Eve Sherman (m. 1803)
- Children: 4
- Parent: David Shriver (father)
- Relatives: Isaac Shriver (brother); Jacob Shriver (brother); Edward Shriver (nephew)
- Occupation: Politician; engineer; innkeeper

David Shriver Jr. (April 14, 1769 – April 28, 1852) was an American politician and engineer from Maryland. He served as a member of the Maryland House of Delegates, representing Frederick County in 1807.

== Early life ==
David Shriver Jr. was born on April 14, 1769, at Little Pipe Creek in Frederick County (later Carroll County), Maryland, to Rebecca (née Ferree) and David Shriver. His brothers were Isaac and Jacob.

== Career ==
Shriver served as a member of the Maryland House of Delegates, representing Frederick County, in 1807. He worked as a civil engineer. In 1809, he was superintendent of construction of the turnpike between Westminster and Hagerstown. From around 1816 to 1820, he was superintendent of construction of the National Road. In 1820, he was commissioner of roads west of the Ohio River. He also served as the commissioner of public works.

Shriver was president of Cumberland Bank in Cumberland. He also worked in Cumberland as an innkeeper and hotel owner.

== Personal life ==
Shriver married Eve Sherman, daughter of Jacob Sherman, of Westminster on February 28, 1803. They had four children, Jacob, Elizabeth, William Wagoner and George. His nephew Edward Shriver served in the state legislature.

Shriver died on April 28, 1852, in Cumberland.
