= Best Buddies International =

American nonprofit organization

- Founded: 1989; 37 years ago
- Founder: Anthony Kennedy Shriver
- Type: Service
- Purpose: To enhance the lives of people with intellectual and developmental disabilities
- Headquarters: Miami, Florida, U.S.
- Origins: Georgetown University
- Region served: Worldwide
- Method: Community service
- Website: bestbuddies.org

Best Buddies International is an American nonprofit 501(c)(3) organization. It consists of volunteers that create opportunities for people with intellectual and developmental disabilities (IDD). The program's main purpose is to pair volunteers with a buddy who has an intellectual and developmental disability and provide them with a friend or a mentor. Best Buddies is the world's largest organization dedicated to ending the social, physical and economic isolation of the 200 million people with IDD. It is an international movement that has spread to over 54 countries worldwide.

Founded in 1989 by Anthony Kennedy Shriver, Best Buddies is an international organization with more than 1,500 college, high school and middle school campuses across the United States and internationally. The Georgetown University Chapter of Best Buddies is the biggest in the Washington, D.C., area and is also the birthplace of the organization.

== Programs ==
Best Buddies has eight formal programs – Best Buddies Middle Schools, High Schools, Colleges, Promoters, Citizens, Ambassadors, Jobs, and e-buddies. These programs offer participants with intellectual and developmental disabilities opportunities to learn social skills and job training to be more included in society and to work on being independent. In addition, individuals are able to create true friendships with the people around them and have a sense of inclusion.

=== Best Buddies Middle Schools ===
Best Buddies Middle Schools promotes one-on-one friendships of students with intellectual and developmental disabilities and with students without any disabilities. Peer relationship are a critical area of concern for students with intellectual disabilities in educational settings. The program takes place within the school itself, between the attending students. This program allows social inclusion for disabled students early in their educational career by beginning to learn social skills and how to make friends.

=== Best Buddies High Schools ===
Best Buddies High School Club promotes one-on-one friendships between students with intellectual and developmental disabilities and those without a disability, within the school. The purpose is to create lifelong friendships between the buddy matches that are made. Events are created in the school in order to try and have the rest of school get involved in the chapter. This program tries to break social barriers at a difficult time in a teenager's life, with or without a disability. Members spend time together during lunch break, before or after school. Members also communicate with their buddy's parents to be able to spend time with their new friend outside of school. Research suggests that students without disabilities can form meaningful friendships with peers with severe disabilities in school settings.

=== Best Buddies Colleges ===
Best Buddies College promotes one-on-one friendships between adults with intellectual and developmental disabilities and college students. Peer mentoring programs have shown promise in supporting young adults with IDD in developing social connections and improving wellbeing. Colleges pair up with a group home in the area and work with the adults there, providing them with a chance to be involved with the community since these adults are generally abandoned by family and have difficulties getting careers.

=== Best Buddies Citizens ===
Best Buddies Citizens program was originally created for the people with intellectual and developmental disabilities who were graduating from high school or college and preparing for adulthood more independently. With this program, they were able to continue being a part of Best Buddies in spreading the mission of inclusion. Best Buddies Citizens promotes one-on-one friendships between adults with and without intellectual and developmental disabilities. This program is used to help incorporate adults with disabilities into civic communities. The adults in this program continue to learn social skills, work skills, and skills that they will be able to use in their daily life as an adult. The goal is to create a diverse community and allow adults with disabilities to be a key part of society. Scholars have argued that the lives of people with profound disabilities need not be determined by their impairments, calling for policy reform that treats them as equally valuable members of society.

=== Best Buddies Ambassadors ===
Best Buddies Ambassadors is intended to train people with IDD to be leaders and public speakers in their schools, communities, and workplace. It is intended to be a part of the Disability Rights Movement - teaching people with IDD the skills needed to successfully self-advocate. The program is intended to prepare people with IDD to become active agents of change. The ambassadors can also be people without IDD. Buddy pairs are encouraged to be ambassadors together in order to help spread the Best Buddies mission by demonstrating friendship and inclusion.

=== Best Buddies Jobs ===
Best Buddies Jobs is a program that makes sure people with intellectual and developmental disabilities get competitive paying jobs and equal employment. This program provides a support system for both the employee with a disability and the employer.

=== e-Buddies ===
e-Buddies offers a safe place for those with and without intellectual and developmental disabilities (IDD) to create online friendships. This program helps members, ages 13 and older, develop technology skills to become more confident in communicating online. Since people with IDD often have fewer opportunities for social interaction once they graduate, this program helps them continue making friendships while learning to navigate technology. Members can participate in monthly group events or be paired for a one-to-one friendship. All participants are screened to ensure the safety of those with and without intellectual and developmental disabilities.

=== Best Buddies Living ===
The Best Buddies Living program encourages people with and without IDD to live together in a community that is focused on supporting all residents in accomplishing their goals.

== Chapters ==
The first official Best Buddies chapter was founded at Georgetown University in 1989, and the second was at The Catholic University of America in 1991. As of 2019, there are over 1,500 chapters, and over 400 on college campuses.

Each chapter has an official website called the Chapter Portal. Through this site, members are able to view the calendar, roster, or other important information about the chapter. The administration of a chapter is responsible for updating the Chapter Portal when necessary.

== Fundraising and events ==
83% of the revenue goes directly to Best Buddies programs, and 17% goes towards administration and fundraising. The amount that goes towards fundraising is used to create events such as the Friendship Walk and the Best Buddies Challenge.

=== Best Buddies Friendship Walk ===
The Best Buddies Friendship Walk began in 2009 and has since spread to over 24 states. The Friendship Walk has raised over $2 million for Best Buddies. The purpose of the walk is to raise money for Best Buddies.

=== Best Buddies Challenge ===
The Best Buddies Challenge is the organization's largest fundraising initiative, sponsored by German car manufacturer Audi. It consists of three annual events in the United States in which participants cycle, walk or run. Participants are encouraged to participate alongside Best Buddies, those with intellectual and developmental disabilities.

=== Best Buddies Leadership Conference ===
The Best Buddies Leadership Conference is a program offered at the Indiana University in Bloomington, Indiana. The program has four education tracks that are meant for different positions within a chapter or community. The conference takes place once a year for four days. Through the four days, participants go to workshops, seminars, and events.

Some of the conference highlights are: leadership development and public speaking sessions, and learning about the disabilities rights movement.

=== Best Buddies Ventures ===
Best Buddies Ventures creates employment opportunities for people with intellectual and developmental disabilities (IDD) while serving as a way to raise funds to help grow the Best Buddies program.

In June 2020, Best Buddies launched their first venture with Rosetta Bakery. This nonprofit agency partnered with a for-profit company to create a program to bridge the gap with inclusion and job opportunities. Best Buddies x Rosetta Bakery is a partnership that allows customers to support Best Buddies by purchasing food and coffee. In addition, this South Florida bakery allows those with IDD to showcase their talents through employment and internship opportunities. This bakery serves Italian treats, including focaccia, pizza, sandwiches, coffee, pastries, and cakes. 50% of each bakery purchase goes to help expand the programs offered by Best Buddies. The hope is to take this business model and expand it worldwide.

== Sponsorship ==
The top sponsor of Best Buddies International is Audi, but other companies that have donated over $500,000 are Silicon Valley Bank, Country Kitchen, and Zenith.

=== Audi of America Partnership ===
Through Audi sponsorship, Best Buddies International was able to raise more than US$11.8 million for Best Buddies programs from events in Palm Beach, Hyannis Port, Hearst Castle, New York, Washington and Miami in 2008.

Introduced in April 2007 at Art Chicago, the car toured cities between New York and Mexico City, culminating in Miami, where it was sold at a live auction benefiting the charity.

Audi is the title sponsor of the Audi Best Buddies Challenge: Washington, D.C. In addition to being the title sponsor for this event, Audi is featured at all other Best Buddies national events. Best Buddies and Audi also collaborate on a variety of cause marketing programs throughout the year that take place on both the national and regional levels.

Audi has also agreed to support the beginning of Best Buddies Jobs Washington, D.C. Audi had been sponsoring Best Buddies since 2007 and plans to continue to do so through December 31, 2014.

=== International ===
Best Buddies is attempting to create relationships with organizations in countries in the Middle East.

In 2007, Anthony Kennedy Shriver announced the opening of a new accredited program in Doha, Qatar, in collaboration with the Shafallah Center for Children with Special Needs, a nonprofit charitable organization.

As of January 2018, Best Buddies had chapters in 50 countries around the world, spanning six continents.

== Other Sponsors ==
Other sponsors of Best Buddies include Foundations and Government Partners such as the Annenberg Foundation, the Florida Department of Education and the United States Department of Education. Best Buddies also accepts donations from individual donors.
