= Anthony Shriver =

American activist

Personal details
- Born: Anthony Paul Kennedy Shriver; July 20, 1965 (age 61) Boston, Massachusetts, U.S.
- Party: Democratic
- Other political affiliations: We the People (from 2024)
- Spouse: Alina Mojica (m. 1993; div. 2018)
- Children: 5
- Parent(s): Sargent Shriver; Eunice Kennedy Shriver
- Relatives: Shriver family Kennedy family
- Education: Georgetown University

Anthony Paul Kennedy Shriver (born July 20, 1965) is an American activist for people with intellectual disabilities. In 1989, he founded Best Buddies International, an international organization that helps people with intellectual disabilities to find employment and social opportunities. Through his mother, he is a nephew of World War II casualty Joseph P. Kennedy Jr., President John F. Kennedy, Senator Robert F. Kennedy, and Senator Ted Kennedy.

== Early life and education ==
Anthony Shriver was born in Boston, Massachusetts, to Eunice Kennedy Shriver and Sargent Shriver, Jr. His mother is the founder of Special Olympics and his father is a founding director of the Peace Corps.

He graduated from the Georgetown Preparatory School in 1984. He then attended Brown University before transferring to Georgetown University in Washington, D.C., from which he graduated in 1988 with a double major in theology and history.

== Career ==
Shriver is the founder and chairman of Best Buddies International a nonprofit 501(c)(3) organization which he created in 1989. Best Buddies is a nonprofit organization that provides adults and children with intellectual and developmental disabilities social inclusion and job opportunities. He has been able to get the organization to spread throughout the world and it has over 1500 chapters today. Shriver spoke in 2008 about the all-inclusive nature of the program: "The great thing about Best Buddies is there's something for everybody. You can be a volunteer in some shape, form or fashion, whether you're volunteering to get your kids involved, whether your son or daughter is involved in their school program, whether you want to be a mentor yourself as an adult, whether you want to get an online Buddy, whether you're an employer and want to hire someone with a disability to work in your office—if you've got any sense of motivation and determination and want to give back, there's a role for you at Best Buddies, which I think is pretty unique. Even in Special Olympics, for most people, you can be a coach or a spectator, but you're not going to run the 50-yard dash. In Best Buddies, you're running the 50-yard dash with your Buddy. People get a different level of experience by participating, as opposed to writing a check, though that's important, too. But beyond writing checks, we need people to get involved and give their time."

Best Buddies has grown internationally across six continents and 54 countries as a global volunteer movement creating opportunities for one-to-one friendships, integrated employment and leadership development for people with intellectual and developmental disabilities.

In 2017, the Boston Globe uncovered that donations from Best Buddies had been given to Tom Brady's personal charity. "Since 2011, while Brady has served as the face of its signature Massachusetts fund-raiser and helped it raise nearly $20 million, Best Buddies has paid $2.75 million to Brady's own charitable trust and has pledged to grant the organization an additional $500,000 in 2017--a total of $3.25 million.". In 2017, Boston Globe journalists were denied access to the annual Hyannis Port Challenge at Harvard university, Best Buddies later apologized for the incident.

In addition, Anthony and his brother Timothy (the chairman of the Special Olympics) have recently aligned Best Buddies and the Special Olympics to create the Eunice Kennedy Shriver Challenge event, aimed to encourage greater acceptance and inclusion for those with intellectual and developmental disabilities. Shriver has also been a director of UniCapital Corp, an investment house, since March 1998. He participated in the inaugural Forum of Young Global Leaders in 2005, hosted by the World Economic Forum in Zermatt, Switzerland.

Shriver is currently on the board of directors of Level Brands.

== Politics ==
Shriver - along with most members of the extended Kennedy family - is a part of the Democratic Party. In 2005, he considered running for Governor of Florida in the 2006 election. He was also said to have considered a run for Governor of Florida in the 2010 election. He was the only cousin or sibling of Robert F Kennedy Jr to endorse his 2024 presidential campaign.

== Personal life ==
Shriver married Alina Mojica on July 2, 1993, in Hyannis Port, Massachusetts. Until March 2020, he resided in Miami Beach, Florida, with Alina and their five children: Edward Anthony “Teddy” Shriver (b. 1988, who married Torri Newman), Eunice Julia Shriver (b. 1994, who married Michael “Mikey” Garcia), Francesca Maria “Chessy” Shriver (b. 1994), Carolina Fitzgerald “Caro” Kennedy Shriver (b. 2001) and John Joseph “Joey” Sargent Shriver (b. 2009). Alina and Anthony filed for divorce in November 2018; they sold their shared Miami Beach home in March 2020.
