= Double Pipe Creek =

Stream in the U.S. state of Maryland

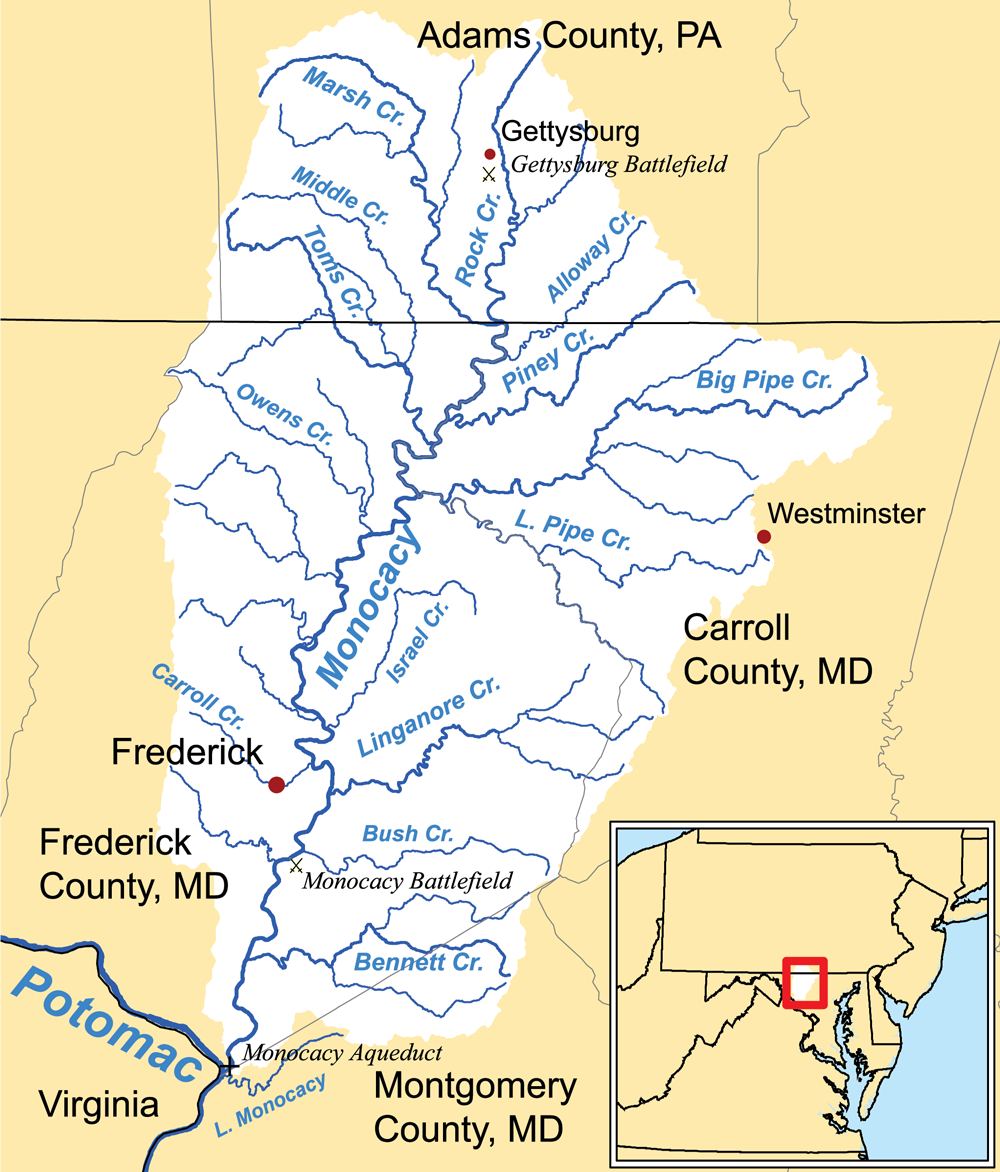
Watershed map showing Big Pipe, Little Pipe and Double Pipe Creek

Double Pipe Creek, sometimes called Pipe Creek, is a major tributary of the Monocacy River in Carroll County and Frederick County in Maryland, located several miles north and west of Westminster. The creek is only 1.6 miles (2.6 km) long, but is formed by the confluence of two much longer streams, Big Pipe Creek and Little Pipe Creek.

== Course ==
The creek's watershed extends as far east as Manchester, Maryland, and includes the towns of Union Bridge, Taneytown, New Windsor and Westminster. The main stem of the creek is formed from the confluence of Big Pipe Creek, 31.6 miles (50.9 km) long, with headwaters near Manchester; and Little Pipe Creek, 24.9 miles (40.1 km) long, with headwaters in Westminster. From the confluence, near Detour, Maryland (39.6012°N 77.2703°W), Double Pipe flows west for 1.6 miles (2.6 km) to its mouth at the Monocacy, which drains to the Potomac River. The watershed area of Double Pipe Creek is 192.6 square miles (499 km^{2}).

Tributaries include Bear Branch, Big Pipe Creek, Little Pipe Creek, Meadow Branch and Sam's Creek. Double Pipe Creek, the portion of Little Pipe Creek west of Union Bridge, and the western section of Sam's Creek form part of the legal boundary between Frederick County and Carroll County.

== Pollution ==
The Maryland Department of the Environment (MDE) has identified water quality violations for Double Pipe Creek and tributaries, specifically for sediment, nutrients (nitrogen and phosphorus), and bacteria. The principal sources of bacteria appear to be failing septic tanks from residences and/or businesses, pet waste and waste from farm animals (livestock). The pollution sources for sediment include agricultural runoff and urban runoff. (Although agriculture is the predominant land use in the watershed, tributaries of Double Pipe Creek flow through portions of Westminster, Taneytown, New Windsor and Union Bridge.)

== Proposed Union Mills Reservoir ==
Since the 1970s, Carroll County commissioners have been proposing a dam or reservoir, defeated in 1976 by petition and raised again under the title of a proposed Union Mills Reservoir.

== History ==
Before the battle broke out at Gettysburg, General Meade had planned a defensive position for the Army of the Potomac at Pipe Creek, making use of its broad slopes and open fields of fire. In the alternate history Gettysburg, by Gingrich and Forstchen, General Lee seizes Pipe Creek as his defensive line.

== See also ==
- List of Maryland rivers
