= David Shriver =

American politician (1735–1826)

Member of the Maryland Senate from the Western Shore district
- In office 1804–1811

Member of the Maryland House of Delegates from the Frederick County district
- In office 1799–1803 Serving with Francis Brown Sappington, John Thomas, Henry Ridgely Warfield, Thomas Hawkins, Roger Kemp, Roger Nelson, Daniel Clarke
- Preceded by: Upton Bruce, John Gwinn, John Thomas, Henry Ridgely Warfield
- Succeeded by: Daniel Clarke, Joshua Cockey, Thomas Hawkins, Joab Waters
- In office 1794–1796 Serving with George Baer Jr., William Beatty, Benedict Jamison, Valentine Brother, Allen Quynn Jr.
- Preceded by: Mountjoy Bayly, William Beatty, Benedict Jamison, Roger Nelson
- Succeeded by: Upton Bruce, Joshua Gist, John Thomas, Henry Ridgely Warfield

Personal details
- Born: April 28, 1735 near Conewago, Pennsylvania, British America
- Died: January 30, 1826 (aged 90)
- Spouse: Rebecca Ferree (m. 1761; died 1812)
- Children: 8, including David, Isaac and Jacob
- Relatives: Edward Shriver (grandson); Thomas H. Shriver (great-grandson)
- Occupation: Politician; judge

David Shriver (baptized Johann Theobaldt Schreiber; April 28, 1735 – January 30, 1826) was an American politician and judge from Maryland. He served as a member of the Maryland House of Delegates, representing Frederick County from 1794 to 1796 and from 1799 to 1803. He served as a member of the Maryland Senate, representing the western shore district, from 1804 to 1811.

== Early life ==
David Shriver was born on April 28, 1735, near Conewago, Lancaster County, Pennsylvania, to Ann Marie (born Anna Marie Keiser) and Andrew Shriver Jr. (born Andreas Schreiber), who were married in 1733. Andrew Shriver Jr. (b. 1712) – at the age of 9 – with his family immigrated in 1721 from Germany to Philadelphia and settled in Goshenhoppen on the Schuylkill River in Pennsylvania.

David Shriver was baptized as Johann Theobaldt Schreiber on May 22, 1735.

== Career ==
Shriver was on the committee to execute the "Association" to boycott British trade in 1774. On January 24, 1775, he was on the committee of observation in Frederick County, Maryland. He served on the committee until 1776. He was a member of the Maryland Constitutional Convention and signee of the state constitution in 1776, representing the middle district of Frederick County.

Shriver served as a justice of Frederick County. He was appointed to the role in 1777, 1789, 1796, 1798 and 1799. He represented Frederick County in the lower house from 1777 to 1803. He was a member of the Maryland House of Delegates, representing Frederick County, from 1794 to 1796 and from 1799 to 1803. He was an elector of the Maryland Senate in 1801. He served as a member of the Maryland Senate, representing the western shore district, from November 20, 1804, to 1811.

In 1777, Shriver was a lieutenant colonel of the Linganore Battalion.

== Personal life ==
Shriver married Rebecca Ferree, daughter of Abraham Ferree, on May 5, 1761, in Lancaster, Pennsylvania. They had eight children, Andrew, Rachel, David Jr., Abraham, Mary, Isaac, Jacob and Susanna. His wife died in 1812. His grandson Edward Shriver served in the state legislature. Shriver was a member of St. Benjamin's Church, a German Reformed church in Pipe Creek.

Shriver died on January 30, 1826. He was buried in the family burial ground on Little Pipe Creek.
