= John H. Simmons =

American politician (died 1843)

Member of the Maryland House of Delegates from the Frederick County district
- In office 1841–1842 Serving with Daniel S. Biser, John W. Geyer, James M. Schley, Cornelius Staley
- Preceded by: Edward A. Lynch, William Lynch, Joshua Motter, David W. Naill, Davis Richardson
- Succeeded by: Daniel S. Biser, Thomas Crampton, William Lynch, James J. McKeehan, Davis Richardson
- In office 1839–1840 Serving with Daniel S. Biser, Jacob Firor, John McPherson, Caspar Quynn
- Preceded by: George Beckenbaugh, Daniel S. Biser, John W. Geyer, Grafton Hammond, John McPherson, George Schley
- Succeeded by: Edward A. Lynch, William Lynch, Joshua Motter, David W. Naill, Davis Richardson

Personal details
- Died: March 29, 1843 (aged 72) Frederick, Maryland, U.S.
- Occupation: Politician

John H. Simmons (died March 29, 1843) was an American politician from Maryland.

== Biography ==
John H. Simmons served as a member of the Maryland House of Delegates, representing Frederick County from 1839 to 1840 and from 1841 to 1842.

Simmons died on March 29, 1843, aged 72, in Frederick.
