= R. P. T. Dutrow =

American politician (1828–1877)

Member of the Maryland House of Delegates from the Frederick County district
- In office 1868–1870 Serving with Ephraim Albaugh, Noah Bowlus, Joseph Byers, Thomas G. Maynard, Charles F. Wenner
- Preceded by: Henry Baker, Upton Buhrman, Thomas Gorsuch, John L. Linthicum, John R. Rouzer, John A. Steiner
- Succeeded by: Noah Bowlus, Henry R. Harris, John T. McCreery, J. Alfred Ritter, John B. Thomas, William White

Personal details
- Born: Richard P. T. Dutrow; August 1828 Buckeystown, Maryland, U.S.
- Died: June 12, 1877 (aged 48) Frederick County, Maryland, U.S.
- Resting place: Mount Olivet Cemetery
- Party: Democratic
- Spouse: Lucretia Lakin (m. 1849)
- Children: 1
- Education: Mercersburg College
- Occupation: Politician; farmer

Richard P. T. Dutrow (August 1828 – June 12, 1877) was an American politician from Maryland. He served as a member of the Maryland House of Delegates, representing Frederick County from 1868 to 1870.

== Early life ==
Richard P. T. Dutrow was born in August 1828 on a Dutrow farm in western Buckeystown, Frederick County, Maryland, to Samuel Dutrow. He attended public schools in Frederick County and Mercersburg College.

== Career ==
Dutrow was a Democrat. He served as a member of the Maryland House of Delegates, representing Frederick County from 1868 to 1870. In 1875, he served as county commissioner of Frederick County.

Dutrow was a farmer and owned a 280 acres (110 ha) farm in Buckeystown. He was a southern sympathizer and slave owner.

== Personal life ==
Dutrow married Lucretia Lakin, daughter of William Lakin, of Jefferson in 1849. They had one son, R. Claude. He lived at a brick house near Carrollton Manor. He was an elder at Trinity Reformed Church in Adamstown.

Dutrow died on June 12, 1877, after the Frederick, Washington and Mount Vernon excursion train of the Baltimore and Ohio Railroad collided with another train in Frederick County. He was buried at Mount Olivet Cemetery.
