= Motter =

Motter is a surname. Notable people with the surname include:

- Adilson E. Motter (born 1974), Brazilian scientist
- Alex Motter (1913–1996), Canadian professional ice hockey player
- Dean Motter, Canadian illustrator, designer and writer
- Joshua Motter (1801–1875), American politician from Maryland
- Lewis M. Motter (1815–1910), American politician from Maryland
- Taylor Motter (born 1989), American professional baseball player

== See also ==
- Jeni Mawter (born 1959), Australian children's author
- John C. Motter House, historic building in Frederick, Maryland
- William Motter Inge (1913–1973), American playwright and novelist
