= Davis Richardson =

American politician (died 1858)

Member of the Maryland House of Delegates from the Frederick County district
- In office 1852–1854 Serving with William P. Anderson, James M. Coale, George W. Ent, James M. Geyer, John Lee, Henry McElfresh
- Preceded by: William P. Anderson, Daniel S. Biser, Benjamin A. Cunningham, Thomas H. O'Neal, Jacob Root
- Succeeded by: William T. Gittings, James J. Johnson, Lewis M. Motter, William E. Salmon, William C. Sappington, David Thomas
- In office 1842–1843 Serving with Daniel S. Biser, Thomas Crampton, William Lynch, James J. McKeehan
- Preceded by: Daniel S. Biser, John W. Geyer, James M. Schley, John H. Simmons, Cornelius Staley
- Succeeded by: Edward Buckey, William Lynch, David W. Naill, Edward Shriver, Otho Thomas
- In office 1840–1841 Serving with Edward A. Lynch, William Lynch, Joshua Motter, David W. Naill
- Preceded by: Daniel S. Biser, Jacob Firor, John McPherson, Caspar Quynn, John H. Simmons
- Succeeded by: Daniel S. Biser, John W. Geyer, James M. Schley, John H. Simmons, Cornelius Staley
- In office 1830–1832 Serving with David Kemp, John H. McElfresh, Evan McKinstry, William Cost Johnson, Abraham Jones
- Preceded by: Roderick Dorsey, John Kinzer, Isaac Shriver, Francis Thomas
- Succeeded by: Thomas Hammond, William Cost Johnson, David Schley, Abdiel Unkefer

Personal details
- Died: October 20, 1858 near Buckeystown, Maryland, U.S.
- Party: Whig
- Occupation: Politician

Davis Richardson (died October 20, 1858) was an American politician from Maryland.

== Biography ==
Davis Richardson was a Whig. He served as a member of the Maryland House of Delegates, representing Frederick County from 1830 to 1832, 1840 to 1841, 1842 to 1843 and 1852 to 1854.

Richardson died on October 20, 1858, aged 75 or 76, near Buckeystown.
