= McElfresh =

McElfresh is a surname. Notable people with the surname include:

- Henry McElfresh (1825/26–1852), American politician from Maryland, son of John
- John H. McElfresh (1796–1841), American politician from Maryland
