= James M. Schley =

American politician and lawyer (died 1883)

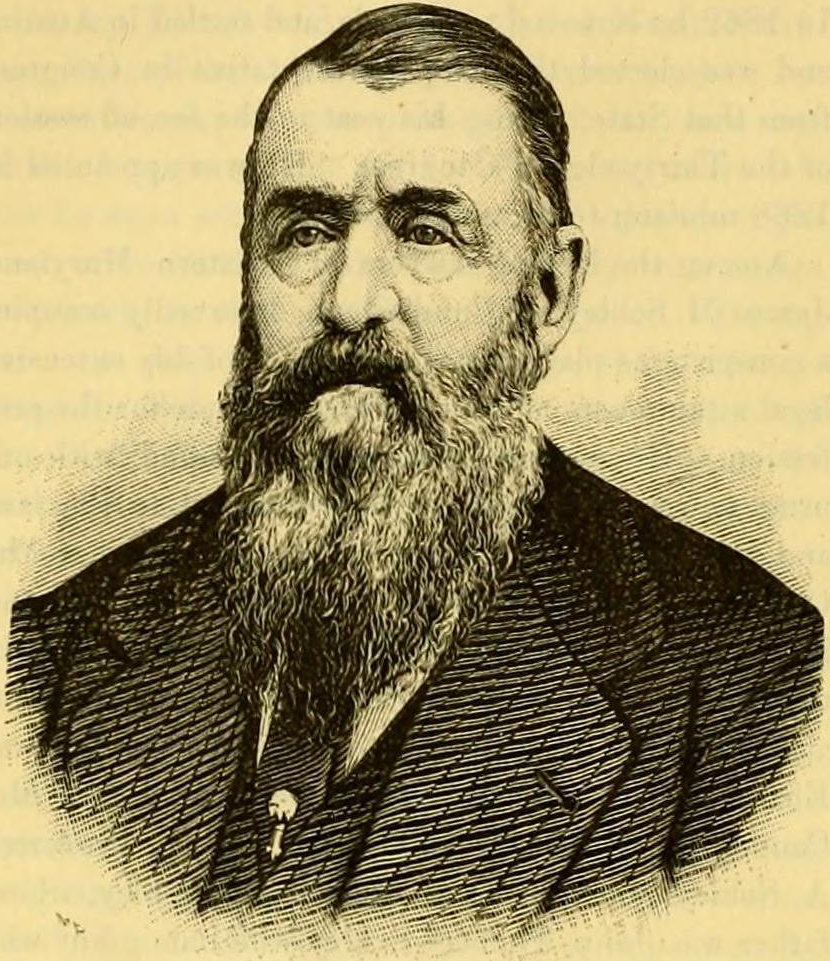
- Schley in a 1882 publication

Member of the Maryland House of Delegates from the Allegany County district
- In office 1845–1846 Serving with Jeremiah Berry, John H. Patterson, John Swan
- Preceded by: James Fitzpatrick, Patrick Hammill, John Neff, Michael C. Sprigg
- Succeeded by: Owen D. Downey, John H. Patterson, P. Roman Steck, John Swan

Member of the Maryland House of Delegates from the Frederick County district
- In office 1841–1842 Serving with Daniel S. Biser, John W. Geyer, John H. Simmons, Cornelius Staley
- Preceded by: Edward A. Lynch, William Lynch, Joshua Motter, David W. Naill, Davis Richardson
- Succeeded by: Daniel S. Biser, Thomas Crampton, William Lynch, James J. McKeehan, Davis Richardson

Personal details
- Born: James McCannon Schley; Frederick, Maryland, U.S.
- Died: November 15, 1883 (aged 68) Cumberland, Maryland, U.S.
- Resting place: Mount Olivet Cemetery
- Party: Democratic
- Spouse(s): Ellen N. Stull (died 1880) Guy Allen
- Education: Princeton College
- Occupation: Politician; lawyer; bank president; railroad executive
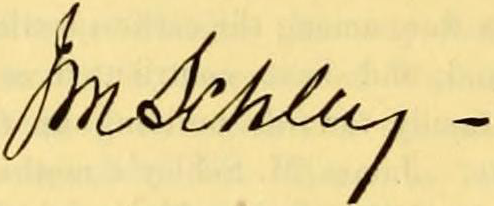
- Signature

James McCannon Schley (died November 15, 1883) was an American politician and lawyer from Maryland. He served as a member of the Maryland House of Delegates, representing Frederick County from 1841 to 1842 and representing Allegany County from 1845 to 1846.

== Early life ==
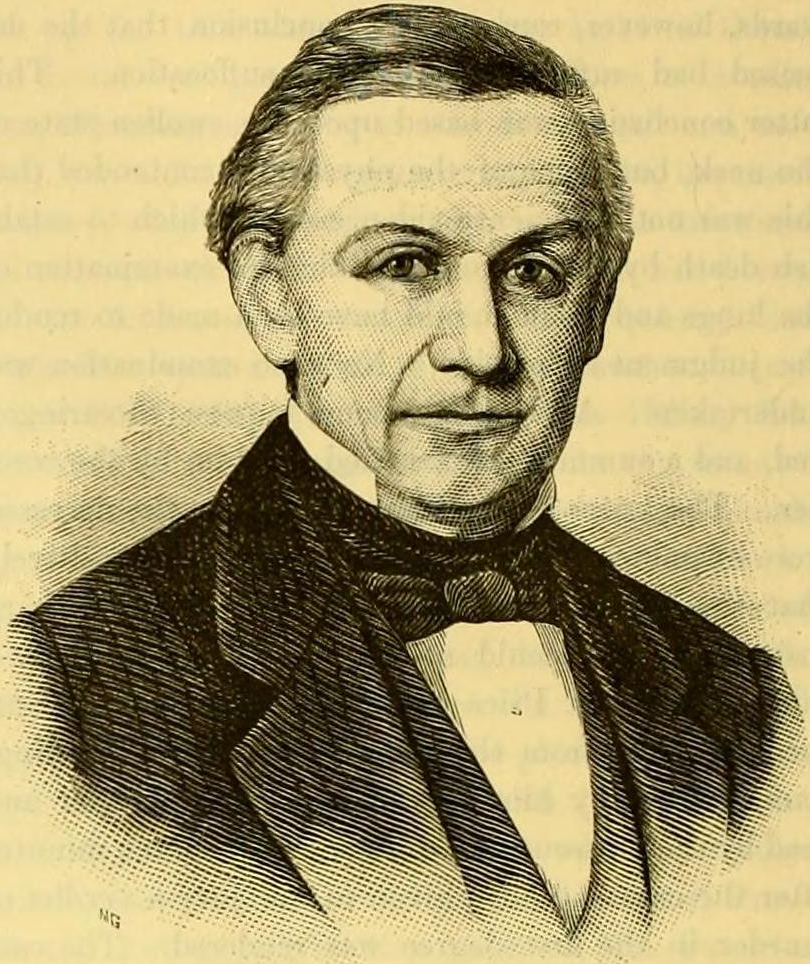
Frederick A. Schley, Schley's father

James McCannon Schley was born in Frederick, Maryland, to Eliza Asbury (née McCannon) and Frederick Augustus Schley. His father was a lawyer in western Maryland. His great-grandfather John Thomas Schley built the first house in Frederick in 1746. He graduated from Princeton College. He studied law in Frederick and was admitted to the bar.

== Career ==
After graduating, Schley practiced law in Frederick County.

Schley was a Democrat. He served as a member of the Maryland House of Delegates, representing Frederick County from 1841 to 1842. He then declined a nomination for the state senate. In 1843, he moved to Cumberland and served in the Maryland House of Delegates representing Allegany County from 1845 to 1846. He was appointed as deputy state's attorney of Allegany County by Governor Enoch Louis Lowe. In 1855, he was elected as state's attorney of Allegany County and served in that role for nine years. He again refused nomination for the state senate. He was a member of the board of commissioners of Cumberland and helped plan the water system. In November 1880, he formed a law partnership with J. W. Thomas. In 1880, he ran for U.S. Congress, but lost to Milton Urner.

At the time of his death, Schley was president of the Third National National Bank in Cumberland. In 1879, he became president of the Pennsylvania Railroad in Maryland and served in that role until his death. He commanded a rifle company in Frederick. He also commanded the Cumberland Guards in 1855 and he commanded the Allegany Guards militia. He and the Allegany Guards were present at the Inauguration of James Buchanan. He was president of the Allegany County Jockey Club.

== Personal life ==
Schley married twice. His first wife Ellen N. Stull, daughter of Otho Holland Williams Stull. She died in 1880. Around 1881, he married Mrs. Guy Allen. He had no children. He was a member of the Presbyterian church.

Schley died on November 15, 1883, aged 68, at his home on Washington Street in Cumberland. He was interred at Mount Olivet Cemetery in Frederick.
