= Thomas Crampton (politician) =

American politician (died 1854)

Member of the Maryland House of Delegates from the Frederick County district
- In office 1842–1843 Serving with Daniel S. Biser, William Lynch, James J. McKeehan, Davis Richardson
- Preceded by: Daniel S. Biser, John W. Geyer, James M. Schley, John H. Simmons, Cornelius Staley
- Succeeded by: Edward Buckey, William Lynch, David W. Naill, Edward Shriver, Otho Thomas

Personal details
- Died: September 25, 1854

Thomas Crampton (died September 25, 1854) was an American politician from Maryland.

== Biography ==
Thomas Crampton served as a member of the Maryland House of Delegates, representing Frederick County from 1842 to 1843.

Crampton died on September 25, 1854.
