= Peter Grabill =

American politician (1820–1890)

Member of the Maryland House of Delegates from the Frederick County district
- In office 1846–1849 Serving with George Doub, Jeremiah G. Morrison, Jacob Root, James Stevens, Thomas Turner, Gideon Bantz, John D. Gaither, William Lynch, John Need
- Preceded by: Daniel S. Biser, Henry Boteler, Francis J. Hoover, Enoch Louis Lowe, George Zollinger
- Succeeded by: William P. Anderson, Daniel S. Biser, Benjamin A. Cunningham, Thomas H. O'Neal, Jacob Root

Personal details
- Born: June 10, 1820 near Emmitsburg, Maryland, U.S.
- Died: May 12, 1890 (aged 69) Frizzellburg, Maryland, U.S.
- Party: Whig
- Spouse: Sallie Rudisill (m. 1841)
- Children: 2
- Education: Pennsylvania College
- Occupation: Politician

Peter Grabill (June 10, 1820 – May 12, 1890) was an American politician from Maryland.

== Early life ==
Peter Grabill was born on June 10, 1820, near Emmitsburg, Maryland. His brother was John Grabill. He graduated from Pennsylvania College in the class of 1838.

== Career ==
Grabill was a Whig. He served as a member of the Maryland House of Delegates, representing Frederick County from 1846 to 1849. Around 1850, he built a plank road from Emmitsburg to Westminster.

== Personal life ==
Grabill married Sallie Rudisill of Taneytown on October 25, 1841. He had two daughters, Margaret and Mrs. William Louis Fleagle. His daughter Margaret married Maryland politician Jacob Rinehart.

Grabill died on May 12, 1890, at the home of his daughter in Frizzellburg.
