= Cornelius Staley =

American politician and judge (1808–1883)

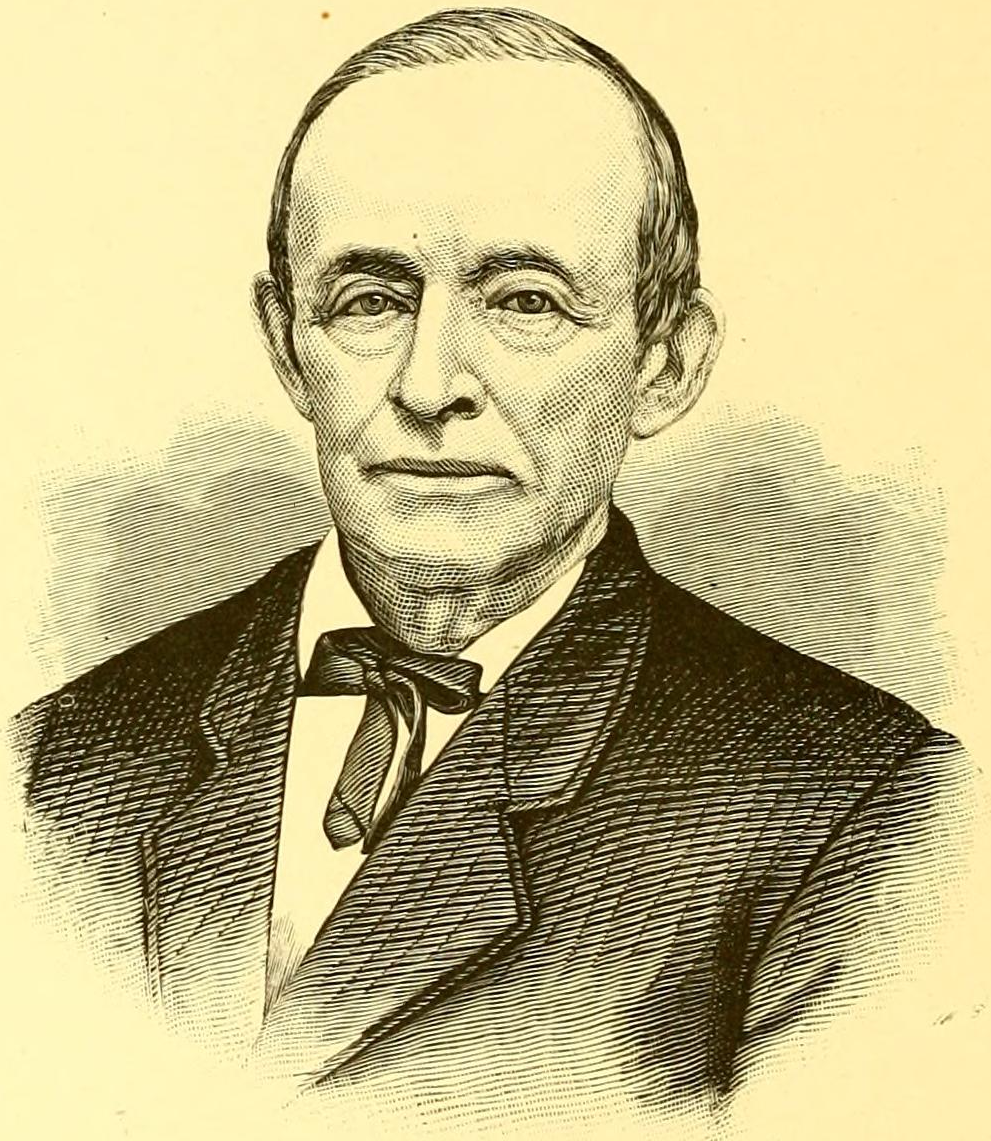
- Staley in a 1882 publication

Member of the Maryland House of Delegates from the Frederick County district
- In office 1841–1842 Serving with Daniel S. Biser, John W. Geyer, James M. Schley, John H. Simmons
- Preceded by: Edward A. Lynch, William Lynch, Joshua Motter, David W. Naill, Davis Richardson
- Succeeded by: Daniel S. Biser, Thomas Crampton, William Lynch, James J. McKeehan, Davis Richardson

Personal details
- Born: October 22, 1808 near Frederick, Maryland, U.S.
- Died: March 13, 1883 (aged 74) near Frederick, Maryland, U.S.
- Spouse: Ruanna Snively (m. 1829)
- Children: 2
- Occupation: Politician; farmer; judge

Cornelius Staley (October 22, 1808 – March 13, 1883) was an American politician and judge from Maryland. He served as a member of the Maryland House of Delegates, representing Frederick County from 1841 to 1842.

== Early life ==
Cornelius Staley was born on October 22, 1808, near Frederick, Maryland, to Margaret and John Staley. He attended common schools and was part of the United Brethren in Christ church.

== Career ==
Staley was appointed by the Maryland governor as justice of the peace in 1836. He remained in that role for three years. He served as a member of the Maryland House of Delegates, representing Frederick County from 1841 to 1842. In 1843, he was a member of the board of commissioners of Frederick County.

In 1844, Staley served as first lieutenant in the Ringgold Dragoons. He served as judge of the orphans' court. He was director of the Farmers and Mechanics' National Bank and worked as a farmer. He was president of the Frederick County Agricultural Society from 1859 to 1860.

== Personal life ==
Staley married Ruanna Snively, daughter of Adam Snively, of Washington County on November 17, 1829. He had two daughters, Mrs. Antoinette Frances Gambrill and Mrs. Marietta C. Doub. His daughter Antoinette married James Henry Gambrill Jr., a milling businessman in Frederick.

Staley died on March 13, 1883, at his home near Frederick.
