= William Lynch (Maryland politician) =

American politician (1788–1857)

Member of the Maryland House of Delegates from the Frederick County district
- In office 1847–1849 Serving with Gideon Bantz, John D. Gaither, Peter Grabill, John Need
- Preceded by: George Doub, Peter Grabill, Jeremiah G. Morrison, Jacob Root, James Stevens, Thomas Turner
- Succeeded by: William P. Anderson, Daniel S. Biser, Benjamin A. Cunningham, Thomas H. O'Neal, Jacob Root
- In office 1842–1844 Serving with Daniel S. Biser, Thomas Crampton, James J. McKeehan, Davis Richardson, Edward Buckey, David W. Naill, Edward Shriver, Otho Thomas
- Preceded by: Daniel S. Biser, John W. Geyer, James M. Schley, John H. Simmons, Cornelius Staley
- Succeeded by: Daniel S. Biser, Edward Buckey, William Cost Johnson, Thomas E. D. Poole, Edward Shriver, John H. Worthington
- In office 1840–1841 Serving with Edward A. Lynch, Joshua Motter, David W. Naill, Davis Richardson
- Preceded by: Daniel S. Biser, Jacob Firor, John McPherson, Caspar Quynn, John H. Simmons
- Succeeded by: Daniel S. Biser, John W. Geyer, James M. Schley, John H. Simmons, Cornelius Staley

Personal details
- Born: February 15, 1788 near Jefferson, Maryland, U.S.
- Died: August 1857 (aged 69) near Jefferson, Maryland, U.S.
- Party: Whig
- Occupation: Politician

William Lynch (February 15, 1788 – August 1857) was an American politician from Maryland.

== Biography ==
William Lynch was born on February 15, 1788, near Jefferson, Maryland. His father was a soldier in the Revolutionary War.

Lynch was a Whig. He served as a member of the Maryland House of Delegates, representing Frederick County from 1840 to 1841, 1842 to 1844 and 1847 to 1849.

Lynch had at least three children. One son worked as a lawyer in Alexandria, Virginia. He had a son, John Alexander Lynch, with Eliza Boteler. His son John was a judge of the circuit court. His daughter Mary married Theophilus Stork, president of Newberry College in South Carolina and founder of St. Mark's English Lutheran Church in Baltimore. Lynch died on August 7 or 9, 1857, at his home near Jefferson.
