= Senator Kunkel =

Senator Kunkel may refer to:

- George Kunkel (1893–1965), Pennsylvania State Senate
- Jacob Michael Kunkel (1822–1870), Maryland State Senate
- John Christian Kunkel (1816–1870), Pennsylvania State Senate
