= Mottek =

Mottek is a surname. Notable people with the surname include:

- Frank Mottek, American broadcast journalist
- Hans Mottek (1910–1993), German economic historian

== See also ==
- Motter
