= Senator Shriver =

Senator Shriver may refer to:

- Garner E. Shriver (1912–1998), Kansas State Senate
- Thomas H. Shriver (1846–1916), Maryland State Senate
