= Dutrow (surname) =

Dutrow is a surname. Notable people with the surname include:

- Anthony W. Dutrow (born 1958), American racehorse trainer
- R. P. T. Dutrow (1828–1877), American politician from Maryland
- Richard E. Dutrow Jr. (born 1959), American racehorse trainer
- Richard E. Dutrow Sr. (1937–1999), American racehorse trainer
