= John B. Thomas (politician) =

American politician and judge (1819–1893)

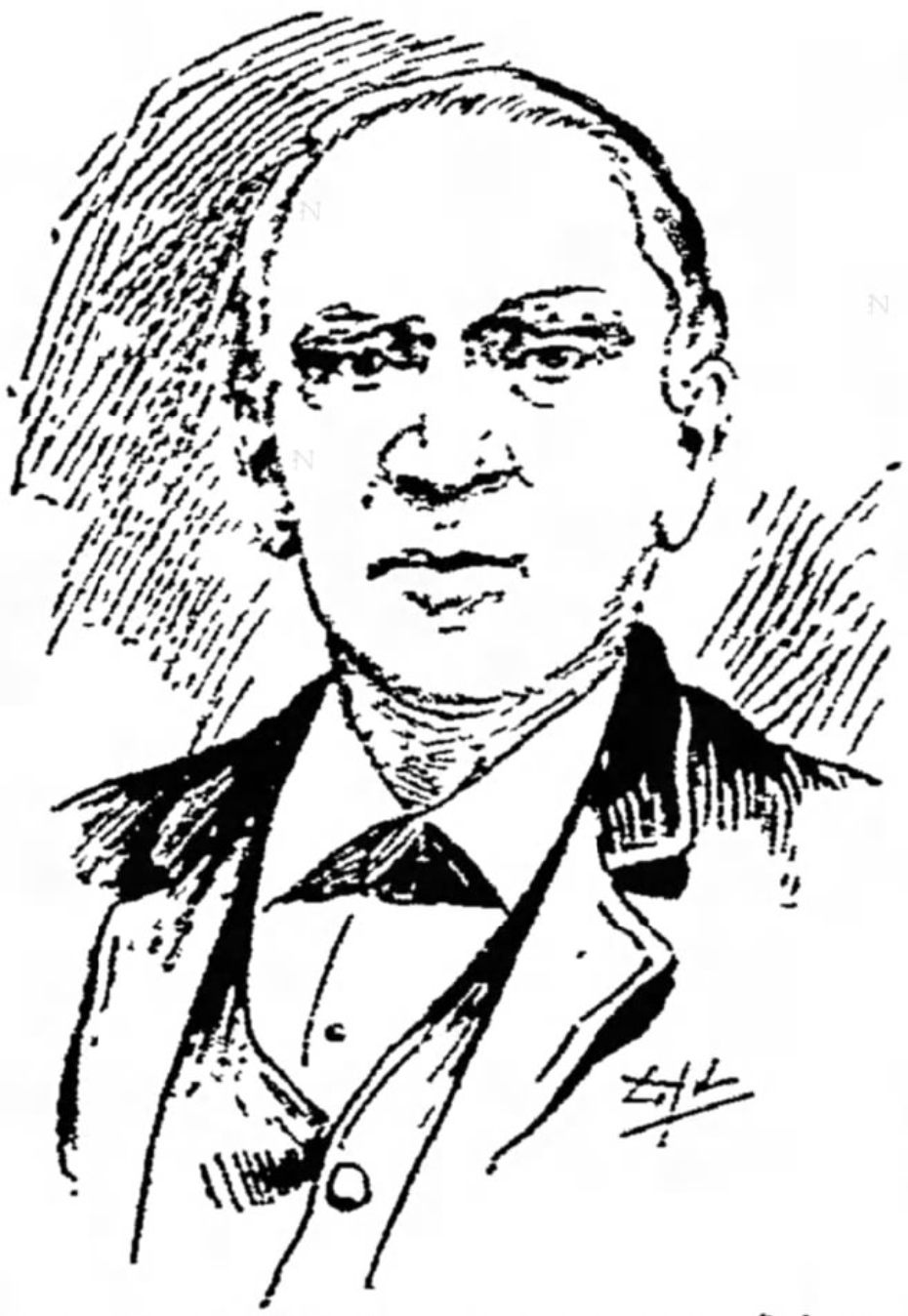
- Sketch of Thomas in a 1893 newspaper

Member of the Maryland House of Delegates from the Frederick County district
- In office 1870–1872 Serving with Noah Bowlus, Henry R. Harris, John T. McCreery, J. Alfred Ritter, William White
- Preceded by: Ephraim Albaugh, Noah Bowlus, Joseph Byers, R. P. T. Dutrow, Thomas G. Maynard, Charles F. Wenner
- Succeeded by: Theodore C. Delaplane, Charles W. Miller, Lycurgus N. Phillips, Jonathan Routzahn, Charles F. Rowe
- In office 1858–1860 Serving with Stephen R. Bowlus, Oliver P. Harding, Ulysses Hobbs, John A. Koons, Jacob Root
- Preceded by: Lawrence J. Brengle, James S. Carper, James L. Davis, Daniel Grove, Peter Hauver, William N. Wolfe
- Succeeded by: Thomas J. Claggett, John A. Johnson, Andrew Kessler, Daniel W. Naill, Jonathan Routzahn, William E. Salmon

Personal details
- Born: John Benjamin Thomas; December 23, 1819 Frederick County, Maryland, U.S.
- Died: October 22, 1893 (aged 73) Frederick, Maryland, U.S.
- Resting place: Mount Olivet Cemetery
- Party: Whig; Democratic
- Spouse(s): Charlotte E. Thomas (m. 1840; died 1875) Harriet McCleery
- Children: 7
- Occupation: Politician; farmer; judge

John Benjamin Thomas (December 23, 1819 – October 22, 1893) was an American politician and judge from Maryland. He served as a member of the Maryland House of Delegates, representing Frederick County from 1858 to 1860 and 1870 to 1872.

== Early life ==
John Benjamin Thomas was born on December 23, 1819, in Frederick County, Maryland, to Margaret E. (née Dutrow) and Levin Thomas. He was educated in county schools. His brother Jacob Thomas of Adamstown was a doctor.

== Career ==
At 17, Thomas took over his father's farm and worked there for five years. He then rented a farm and continued farming until 1855. He moved to Frederick, and purchased a farm 10 miles south of Frederick in 1856. In 1873, he rented his farms and moved to Frederick again. In 1877, he opened a real estate agency.

Thomas was a Whig and later a Democrat. In 1846, he was elected chief judge of the magistrate's court. He served until the role was abolished in 1850. He then served as county commissioner in Frederick County in 1851. He served as a member of the Maryland House of Delegates, representing Frederick County from 1858 to 1860 and from 1870 to 1872. He served as a member of the convention for the Maryland Constitution of 1867. He was commissioned as colonel by Governor Thomas Holliday Hicks in 1860 and he was appointed by the Maryland governor in 1876 to assess the property of Frederick County. He served one term on the school board of Frederick County.

== Personal life ==
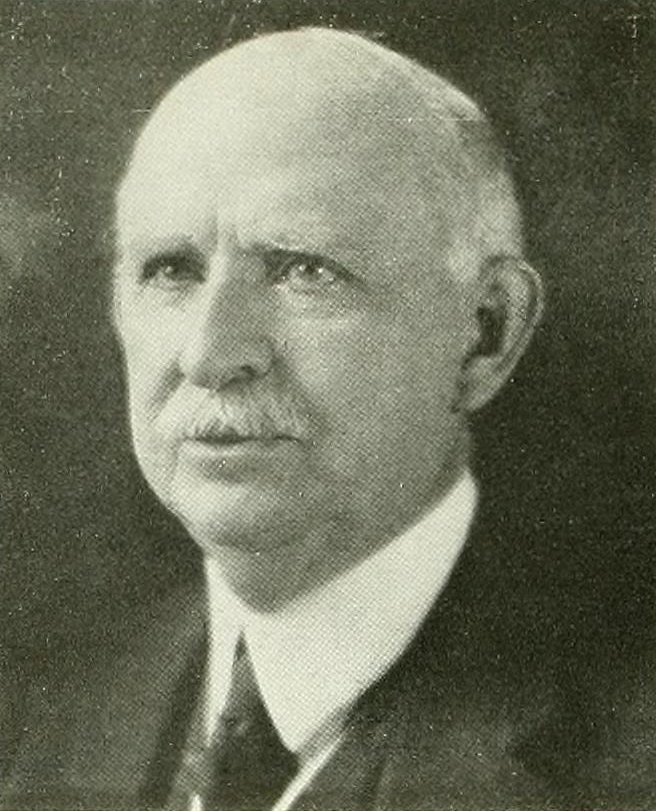
His son, John Benjamin Thomas, Baltimore retail drug business owner

Thomas married Charlotte E. Thomas of Frederick County on October 20, 1840. They had seven children, including S. F., Nellie, Amos, David, John B. Jr. and Charles G. His wife died in 1875. He later married Harriet McCleery of Frederick. He was a deacon and elder of the Reformed Church. He moved to Frederick around 1878 and lived on East Church Street. His son John B. Jr. was president of Thomas & Thompson, a retail drug business in Baltimore.

Thomas died on October 22, 1893, in Frederick. He was buried in Mount Olivet Cemetery.
