= J. Alfred Ritter =

American politician (died 1892)

Member of the Maryland House of Delegates from the Frederick County district
- In office 1870–1872 Serving with Noah Bowlus, Henry R. Harris, John T. McCreery, John B. Thomas, William White
- Preceded by: Ephraim Albaugh, Noah Bowlus, Joseph Byers, R. P. T. Dutrow, Thomas G. Maynard, Charles F. Wenner
- Succeeded by: Theodore C. Delaplane, Charles W. Miller, Lycurgus N. Phillips, Jonathan Routzahn, Charles F. Rowe

Personal details
- Born: John Alfred Ritter Frederick County, Maryland, U.S.
- Died: August 23, 1892 Frederick, Maryland, U.S.
- Resting place: Mount Olivet Cemetery; Frederick, Maryland, U.S.
- Party: Democratic
- Spouse: C. Martin
- Children: 6
- Occupation: Politician; grocer

John Alfred Ritter (died August 23, 1892) was an American politician from Maryland. He served as a member of the Maryland House of Delegates, representing Frederick County from 1870 to 1872.

== Early life ==
John Alfred Ritter was born in Frederick County, Maryland. He moved to Frederick at a young age.

== Career ==
Ritter first worked with A. B. Hanson in the grocery business in Frederick. He formed the firm Quynn and Ritter and worked the grocery trade on East Patrick Street in Frederick for 30 years. He later worked on Market Street. He was proprietor of the City Hotel in Frederick for a time.

Ritter was a Democrat. He served as a member of the Maryland House of Delegates, representing Frederick County from 1870 to 1872. He was a member of the board of alderman for two terms.

== Personal life ==
Ritter married C. Martin of Frederick County. They had two sons and four daughters, Charles, Alfred, Mrs. R. Jones, Mrs. C. O. Keedy, Mrs. Custis and Mrs. William H. Bradley.

Ritter died on August 23, 1892, aged about 70, at his home on East Church Street in Frederick. He was buried in Mount Olivet Cemetery in Frederick.

He also owned Ritter’s Diner, a popular spot in Pittsburgh, PA.
