= Henry McElfresh =

American politician (died 1852)

Member of the Maryland House of Delegates from the Frederick County district
- In office 1852 – March 25, 1852 Serving with William P. Anderson, James M. Coale, James M. Geyer, John Lee, Davis Richardson
- Preceded by: William P. Anderson, Daniel S. Biser, Benjamin A. Cunningham, Thomas H. O'Neal, Jacob Root
- Succeeded by: George W. Ent

Personal details
- Born: 1825/1826
- Died: March 25, 1852 Annapolis, Maryland, U.S.
- Parent: John H. McElfresh (father)
- Occupation: Politician; lawyer

Henry McElfresh (1825/1826 – March 25, 1852) was an American politician and lawyer from Maryland. He served in the Maryland House of Delegates, representing Frederick County in 1852.

== Biography ==
Henry McElfresh was born in 1825 or 1826 to Teresa (née Mantz) and John H. McElfresh. He was admitted to the bar in 1847.

McElfresh served as a member of the Maryland House of Delegates, representing Frederick County in 1852.

McElfresh owned a house on Church Street in Frederick at the time of his death. He died following an illness on March 25, 1852, at City Hotel in Annapolis.
