= James Fenner Lee =

American politician (1843–1898)

Member of the Maryland Senate from the Carroll County district
- In office 1876–1880
- Preceded by: John K. Longwell
- Succeeded by: Henry Vanderford

Personal details
- Born: July 9, 1843 Providence, Rhode Island, U.S.
- Died: January 31, 1898 (aged 54) Myrtle Point, St. Mary's County, Maryland, U.S.
- Resting place: Green Mount Cemetery
- Party: Democratic
- Spouse: Mary Cornelia Read Carroll (m. 1866)
- Children: 5
- Education: Harvard Law School
- Alma mater: Lycée Saint-Louis
- Occupation: Politician; lawyer; farmer

James Fenner Lee (July 9, 1843 – January 31, 1898) was an American politician from Maryland. He served as a member of the Maryland Senate, representing Carroll County from 1876 to 1880.

== Early life ==
James Fenner Lee was born on July 9, 1843, in Providence, Rhode Island, to Sarah F. (née Mallett) and Stephen S. Lee. Shortly after his birth, the family moved to Baltimore, Maryland. He was educated in Baltimore and attended a school in Switzerland. He graduated from the Lycée Saint-Louis in Paris. He returned to Baltimore and was a law student in the office of Brown & Brune. He attended Harvard Law School for a term and then was admitted to the bar.

== Career ==
After his marriage, Lee was gifted a land and a farm in Carroll County by his parents. He published the Maryland Digest with his friend Jacob I. Cohen.

Lee was a Democrat. He was appointed by Governor James Black Groome as one of his aide-de-camps and was given the rank of colonel. He served as a member of the Maryland Senate, representing Carroll County from 1876 to 1880. He served as president pro tempore in his last term. He was chairman of the joint committee on printing. During his tenure, he helped endow 26 scholarships for the Western Maryland College. Afterward, he moved to Baltimore County and was appointed as Secretary of Legation, an envoy to the court in Vienna, Austria. He was the first envoy of the United States to the republic of Brazil. After serving in the role for eighteen months, he returned to his home in St. Mary's County in 1895.

== Personal life ==
On June 25, 1866, Lee married Mary Cornelia (née Read) Carroll, widow of Albert Carroll, daughter of William George Read and granddaughter of John Eager Howard. They had five children, Arthur Fenner, James Fenner Jr., Sarah J., Stephen Howard and Sophia Howard.

Lee died on January 31, 1898, at his home in Myrtle Point, St. Mary's County. He was buried at Green Mount Cemetery in Baltimore.
