= Somerset R. Waters =

American politician (1829–1919)

Member of the Maryland House of Delegates from the Carroll County district
- In office 1874–1878 Serving with Thomas C. Brown, Henry Galt, Henry Vanderford, Frank Brown, Harrison H. Lamotte, Jacob Rinehart
- Preceded by: Harrison H. Lamotte, Lewis A. J. Lamotte, Trusten Polk, James H. Steele
- Succeeded by: Frank Brown, Frank T. Newbelle, Robert Sellman Jr., Thomas H. Shriver

Personal details
- Born: Somerset Richard Waters; December 1829 Clarksburg, Maryland, U.S.
- Died: May 30, 1919 (aged 89) Waterville, Carroll County, Maryland, U.S.
- Resting place: Pine Grove Cemetery; Mount Airy, Maryland, U.S.
- Party: Democratic
- Spouse: Rachel Ann Waters (m. 1855)
- Children: 1
- Education: University of Maryland School of Medicine
- Occupation: Politician; physician

Somerset Richard Waters (December 1829 – May 30, 1919) was an American politician and physician from Maryland.

== Early life ==
Somerset Richard Waters was born on December 14 or 24, 1829, in Clarksburg, Maryland, to Jerusha Ann (née Shaw) and Richard Rawlings Waters. He graduated from the University of Maryland School of Medicine in 1858.

== Career ==
Following graduation, Waters moved to Carroll County to practice medicine. He practiced for 40 years. He was a member of the Medical and Chirugical Faculty of Maryland and the Carroll County Medical Association.

Waters was a Democrat. He served as a member of the Maryland House of Delegates, representing Carroll County, from 1874 to 1878. He was chief clerk in the office of the state tax commissioner for 28 years.

== Personal life ==
Water married his cousin Rachel Ann Waters, daughter of Reverend Somerset Richard Waters, on December 17, 1855. They had a daughter, Estelle.

Waters died at his Woodside Cottage home in Waterville, Carroll County, on May 30, 1919. He was buried at Pine Grove Cemetery in Mount Airy.
