= William White (Maryland politician) =

American politician and physician (1824–1885)

Member of the Maryland House of Delegates from the Frederick County district
- In office 1870–1872 Serving with Noah Bowlus, Henry R. Harris, John T. McCreery, J. Alfred Ritter, John B. Thomas
- Preceded by: Ephraim Albaugh, Noah Bowlus, Joseph Byers, R. P. T. Dutrow, Thomas G. Maynard, Charles F. Wenner
- Succeeded by: Theodore C. Delaplane, Charles W. Miller, Lycurgus N. Phillips, Jonathan Routzahn, Charles F. Rowe

Personal details
- Born: November 5, 1824 Taneytown, Maryland, U.S.
- Died: February 6, 1885 (aged 60) Mechanicstown, Frederick County, Maryland, U.S.
- Party: Democratic
- Spouse(s): Emily Jane Cover (died 1880) Margaret Saylor Cover
- Children: 7
- Education: University of Maryland, Baltimore
- Occupation: Politician; physician

William White (November 5, 1824 – February 6, 1885) was an American politician and physician from Maryland. He served as a member of the Maryland House of Delegates, representing Frederick County from 1870 to 1872.

== Early life ==
William White was born on November 5, 1824, in Taneytown, Maryland, to John White. His father owned farms near Bruceville, Carroll County, Maryland. White was confirmed at the Lutheran church in Taneytown on April 20, 1839, by Dr. Ezra Keller. His brother was sheriff James W. White of Middleburg. For a year, he studied the ministry under Dr. Remonsnyder. He then studied medicine and graduated from the University of Maryland, Baltimore.

== Career ==
After graduating, White started practicing medicine in Middleburg. He practiced there for one year and then moved to Mechanicstown in 1850. He continued practicing there until his death except for one year he spent in Leitersburg in Washington County, Maryland.

White was a Democrat. He served as a member of the Maryland House of Delegates, representing Frederick County from 1870 to 1872.

== Personal life ==
White married Emily Jane Cover, daughter of John Cover, of Carroll County. They had seven children, John, Thomas, William F. P., F. K., Minnie E., May E. and Howard. His wife died in 1880. He married Margaret Saylor Cover, daughter of reverend D. P. Saylor and widow of John M. Cover. He was an elder of St. John's Church in Mechanicstown. He was elected to attend the General Synod in June 1885.

White died of heart disease on February 6, 1885, in Mechanicstown.
