= Jacob Rinehart =

American politician and physician (1834–1907)

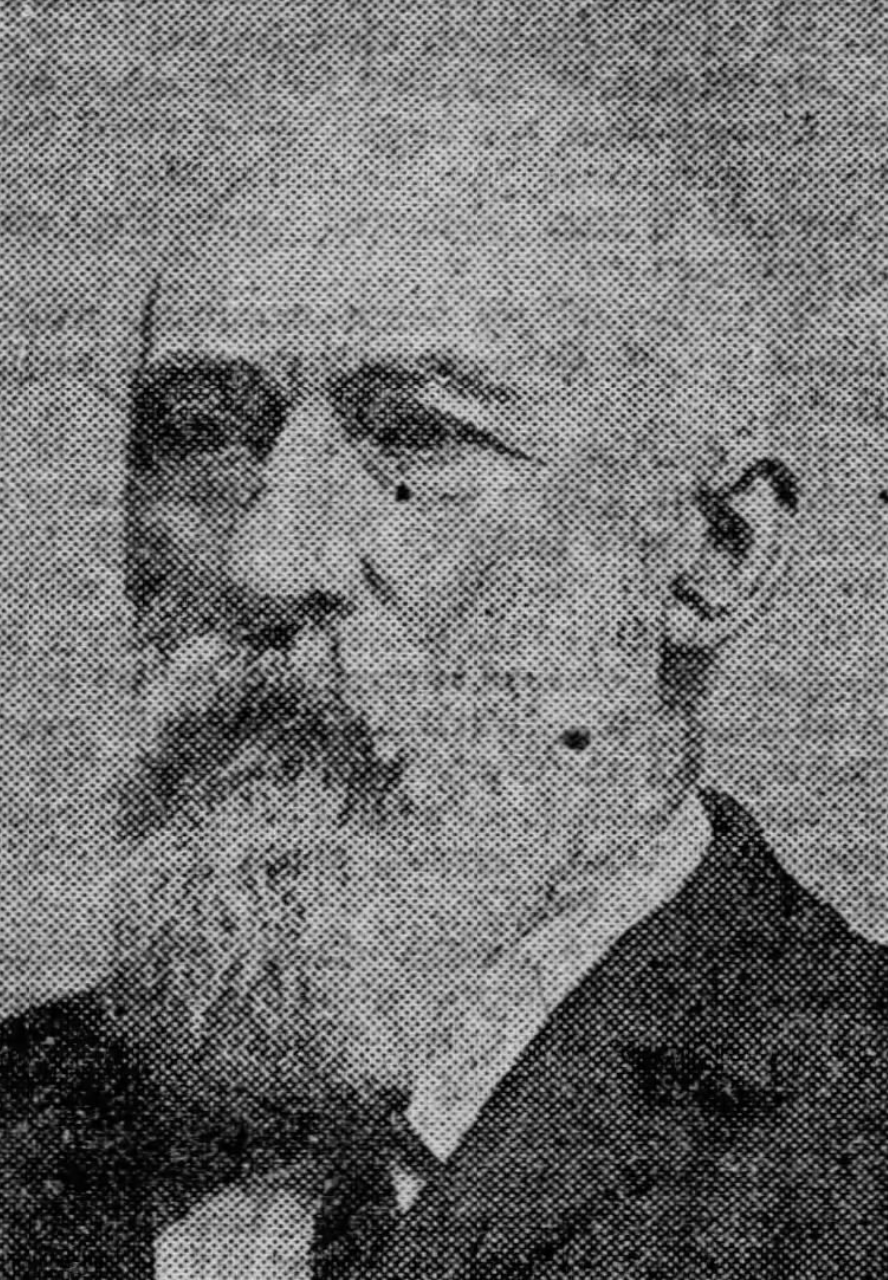
- Rinehart in a 1907 newspaper

Member of the Maryland House of Delegates from the Carroll County district
- In office 1876–1878 Serving with Frank Brown, Harrison H. Lamotte, Somerset R. Waters
- Preceded by: Thomas C. Brown, Henry Galt, Henry Vanderford, Somerset R. Waters
- Succeeded by: Frank Brown, Frank T. Newbelle, Robert Sellman Jr., Thomas H. Shriver

Personal details
- Born: April 26, 1834 Carroll County, Maryland, U.S.
- Died: August 17, 1907 (aged 73) Frizzellburg, Maryland, U.S.
- Resting place: Baust Cemetery
- Party: Democratic
- Spouse: Margaret Grabill (m. 1860; died 1903)
- Children: 2
- Education: Pennsylvania College; Pennsylvania Medical College (MA, MD)
- Occupation: Politician; physician; judge

Jacob Rinehart (April 26, 1834 – August 17, 1907) was an American politician, physician and judge from Maryland.

== Early life ==
Jacob Rinehart was born on April 26, 1834, in Carroll County, Maryland, to John Rinehart. His brother was William G. Rinehart, who later worked as a tax collector. He graduated from Pennsylvania College in September 1855. He later graduated from the Pennsylvania Medical College in 1858 with a Master of Arts and a Doctor of Medicine degree.

== Career ==
After graduating, Rinehart moved to Westminster, Maryland. In the fall of 1858, he moved to Fairfield, Pennsylvania, and started a medical practice. In March 1864, he moved to Frizzellburg, Maryland. He practiced medicine there for over 40 years. He also owned a farm near Frizzellburg.

Rinehart was a Democrat. He served as a member of the Maryland House of Delegates, representing Carroll County, from 1876 to 1878. He served as justice of the peace. He was elected twice as a judge of the orphan's court of Carroll County. He served as chief judge for eight years.

== Personal life ==
Rinehart married Margaret "Maggie" Grabill, daughter of Peter Grabill of Frederick County in 1860. They had one son and one daughter, Harry L. and Mrs. William Arthur. His wife died in 1903.

Rinehart died on August 17, 1907, at his home in Frizzellburg. He was buried in Baust Cemetery.
