= Noah Bowlus =

American politician (1830–1904)

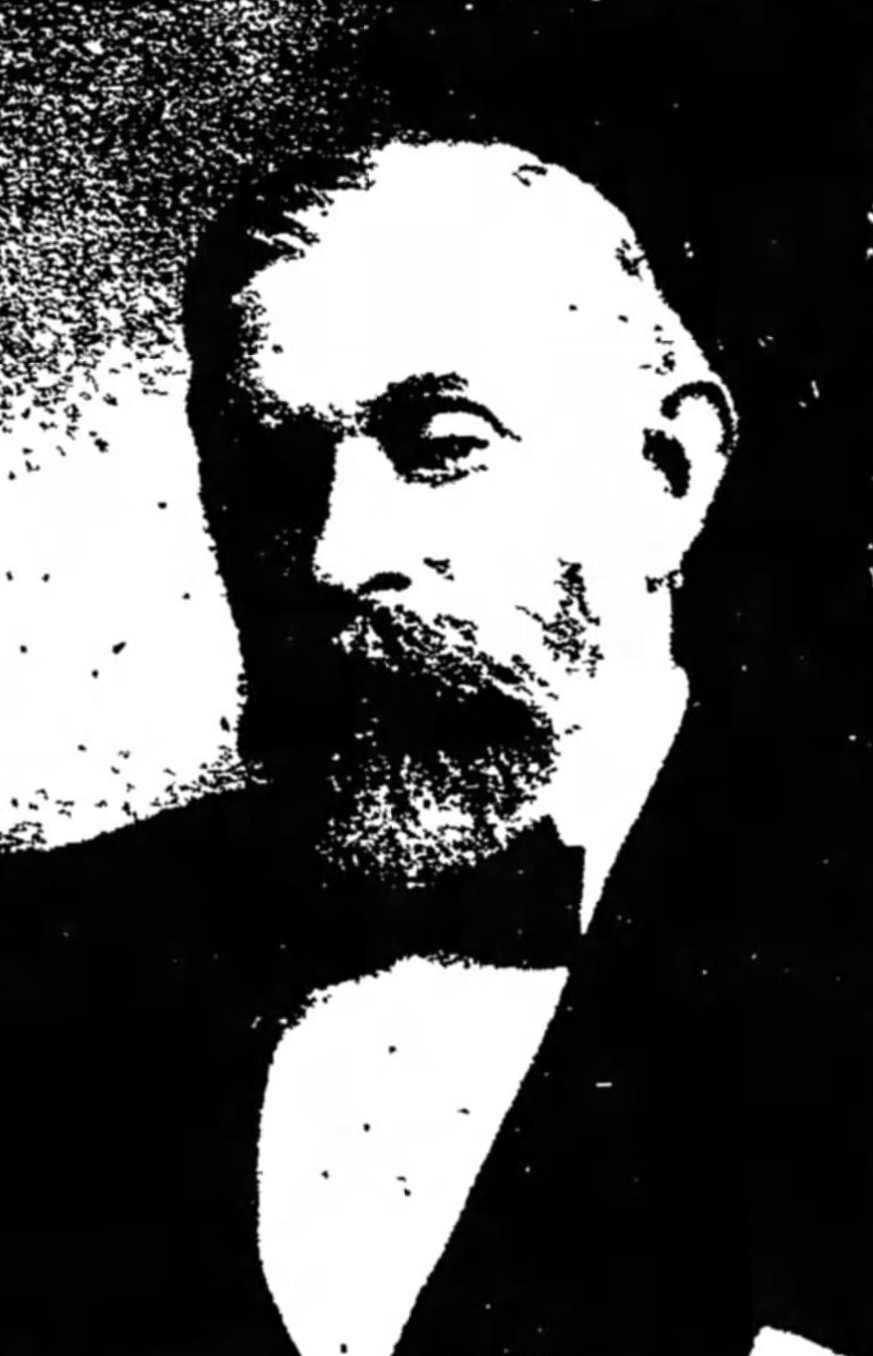
- Bowlus in a 1904 newspaper

Member of the Maryland Senate from the Frederick County district
- In office 1884–1888
- Preceded by: Lewis Henry Steiner
- Succeeded by: Milton Urner

Member of the Maryland House of Delegates from the Frederick County district
- In office 1868–1872 Serving with Ephraim Albaugh, Joseph Byers, R. P. T. Dutrow, Thomas G. Maynard, Charles F. Wenner, Henry R. Harris, John T. McCreery, J. Alfred Ritter, John B. Thomas, William White
- Preceded by: Henry Baker, Upton Buhrman, Thomas Gorsuch, John L. Linthicum, John R. Rouzer, John A. Steiner
- Succeeded by: Theodore C. Delaplane, Charles W. Miller, Lycurgus N. Phillips, Jonathan Routzahn, Charles F. Rowe

Personal details
- Born: 1830 Middletown Valley, Frederick County, Maryland, U.S.
- Died: August 9, 1904 (aged 73–74) Toledo, Ohio, U.S.
- Resting place: Frederick, Maryland, U.S.
- Party: Democratic
- Education: Dickinson College
- Occupation: Politician; businessman

Noah Bowlus (1830 – August 9, 1904) was an American politician from Maryland. He represented Frederick County in the Maryland House of Delegates from 1868 to 1872 and in the Maryland Senate from 1884 to 1888.

== Early life ==
Noah Bowlus was born in 1830 in Middletown Valley, Frederick County, Maryland, to David Bowlus. He graduated from Dickinson College in 1855. He was admitted to the bar in 1857.

== Career ==
Bowlus was a Democrat. He served as a member of the Maryland House of Delegates, representing Frederick County from 1868 to 1872. He was speaker pro tempore of the house in 1870. In 1872, he ran for Maryland Senate, but lost to Lewis Henry Steiner. He later served in the state senate, representing Frederick County, from 1884 to 1888. After he was senator, he moved to Findlay, Ohio, and then moved to Toledo around 1890 to engage in oil.

Bowlus was connected with the Middletown Carriage Works. He owned property in Ohio, oil interests in Virginia and property in Middletown, Maryland.

== Personal life ==
Bowlus did not marry. He enjoyed yachting and was elected as president of the Toledo Yacht Club twice.

Bowlus lived at 1317 Adams Street in Toledo with Mrs. Julia A. Bayless. He died from nephritis on August 9, 1904, at his home in Toledo. He was interred in Frederick, Maryland.
