= Andrew Annan =

American politician and physician (1805–1896)

Member of the Maryland House of Delegates from the Frederick County district
- In office 1874–1876 Serving with John A. Koons, Lewis Lamar, Job M. Miller, John L. Nicodemus
- Preceded by: Theodore C. Delaplane, Charles W. Miller, Lycurgus N. Phillips, Jonathan Routzahn, Charles F. Rowe
- Succeeded by: William H. Hinks, John A. Koons, Robert E. Linthicum, Henry Clay Naill, Christopher M. Riggs

Personal details
- Born: 1805 Emmitsburg, Maryland, U.S.
- Died: July 7, 1896 (aged 90–91) Emmitsburg, Maryland, U.S.
- Party: Republican
- Spouse: Elizabeth Motter (died)
- Children: 5
- Occupation: Politician; physician; banker; businessman

Andrew Annan (1805 – July 7, 1896) was an American politician and medical doctor from Maryland. He served as a member of the Maryland House of Delegates, representing Frederick County from 1874 to 1876.

== Early life ==
Andrew Annan was born in 1805 at the Annan homestead in Emmitsburg, Maryland, to Mary (née Cochran) and Robert I. Annan. His father was a physician.

== Career ==
Annan was a member of the merchant firm Rowe & Annan. In 1856, Rowe withdrew and Annan continued the business as I. S. Annan & Company. In 1858, he withdrew from the company and his son James C. took over. He worked as a physician and he partnered with Dr. Alexander Stewart and James W. Eichelberger Sr. of Shippensburg, Pennsylvania, for a time. After retiring, Annan left his medical business to his son Robert L.

Annan was a Republican. He was a member of the convention for the Maryland Constitution of 1864. He served as a member of the Maryland House of Delegates, representing Frederick County from 1874 to 1876.

In 1882, Annan along with his son Isaac S., his son James C. and Major Oliver Alexander Horner formed the banking firm Annan, Horner & Co. of Emmitsburg.

== Personal life ==
Annan married Elizabeth Motter, daughter of Lewis Motter and sister of Lewis M. Motter. They had at least four sons and one daughter, Robert L., Isaac S., Andrew, James Cochran and Anna E. His wife predeceased him. He was a member of the Presbyterian Church.

Annan died on July 7, 1896, at the home of his son-in-law Oliver Alexander Horner in Emmitsburg.
