= Lycurgus N. Phillips =

American politician (1822–1892)

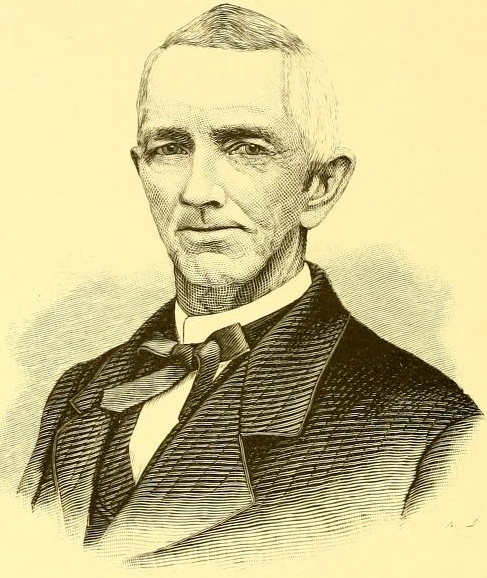
- Phillips in a 1882 publication

Member of the Maryland House of Delegates from the Frederick County district
- In office 1872–1874 Serving with Theodore C. Delaplane, Charles W. Miller, Jonathan Routzahn, Charles F. Rowe
- Preceded by: Noah Bowlus, Henry R. Harris, John T. McCreery, J. Alfred Ritter, John B. Thomas, William White
- Succeeded by: Andrew Annan, John A. Koons, Lewis Lamar, Job M. Miller, John L. Nicodemus

Personal details
- Born: March 28, 1822
- Died: January 13, 1892 (aged 69) near Woodsboro, Maryland, U.S.
- Party: Whig; American; Republican
- Spouse: Miss Biggs (m. 1849)
- Children: 13
- Education: Pennsylvania College
- Occupation: Politician; judge; farmer

Lycurgus N. Phillips (March 28, 1822 – January 13, 1892) was an American politician and judge from Maryland. He served as a member of the Maryland House of Delegates, representing Frederick County from 1872 to 1874.

== Early life ==
Lycurgus N. Phillips was born on March 28, 1822. He was a student at Pennsylvania College from 1839 to 1840.

== Career ==
Phillips was a member of the Whig, American and Republican parties. He was a member of the constitution convention. He served as a member of the Maryland House of Delegates, representing Frederick County from 1872 to 1874. He was judge of the orphans' court in Frederick County. He was a delegate to the 1884 Republican National Convention. He also worked as a farmer.

== Personal life ==
Phillips married a daughter of Joseph Biggs on November 27, 1849. They had thirteen children. He was a Methodist. He had one 95 acres (38 ha) and one 127 acres (51 ha) farm in New Midway and a 132 acres (53 ha) farm in Liberty.

Phillips died on January 13, 1892, at his home near Woodsboro.
