= Joshua Motter =

American politician (1801–1875)

Member of the Maryland House of Delegates from the Frederick County district
- In office 1840–1841 Serving with Edward A. Lynch, William Lynch, David W. Naill, Davis Richardson
- Preceded by: Daniel S. Biser, Jacob Firor, John McPherson, Caspar Quynn, John H. Simmons
- Succeeded by: Daniel S. Biser, John W. Geyer, James M. Schley, John H. Simmons, Cornelius Staley

Personal details
- Born: February 2, 1801
- Died: February 25, 1875 (aged 74) Emmitsburg, Maryland, U.S.
- Resting place: Lutheran Cemetery
- Children: 3
- Relatives: Lewis M. Motter (brother)
- Occupation: Politician; merchant; farmer; railroad executive

Joshua Motter (February 2, 1801 – February 25, 1875) was an American politician from Maryland. He served as a member of the Maryland House of Delegates, representing Frederick County from 1840 to 1841.

== Early life ==
Joshua Motter was born on February 2, 1801, to Mary M. (née Martin) and Lewis Motter. His brothers were Maryland delegate Lewis M. Motter and judge William Motter.

== Career ==
Motter was a merchant and farmer in Emmitsburg, Maryland.

Motter served as justice of the peace. He served as a member of the Maryland House of Delegates, representing Frederick County from 1840 to 1841.

Motter was elected president of the Emmitsburg Railroad (later Baltimore and Emmitsburg Railroad) in November 1868. He was director of the Bank of Gettysburg from May 12, 1837, to 1860, succeeding his father. He also served as director of the Gettysburg National Bank from 1868 to 1875.

== Personal life ==
Motter married. He had a son and two daughters, John L., Lucinda, wife of Elnathan E. Higbee, and Anna B., wife of Jacob Brewer Kershner. He was an elder of the German Reformed Church.

Motter died on February 25, 1875, aged 74, in Emmitsburg. He was buried in the Lutheran Cemetery.
