= Frank T. Newbelle =

American politician (1852–1888)

Member of the Maryland House of Delegates from the Carroll County district
- In office 1878–1880 Serving with Frank Brown, Robert Sellman Jr., Thomas H. Shriver
- Preceded by: Frank Brown, Harrison H. Lamotte, Jacob Rinehart, Somerset R. Waters
- Succeeded by: Benjamin F. Crouse, Robert Sellman, Thomas H. Shriver, William T. Smith

Personal details
- Born: 1852
- Died: September 3, 1888 (aged 36) near Houcksville, Maryland, U.S.
- Resting place: Wesley Chapel
- Party: Democratic
- Spouse: Alice
- Children: 4
- Occupation: Educator; politician

Frank T. Newbelle (1852 – September 3, 1888) was an American politician from Maryland. He served as a member of the Maryland House of Delegates, representing Carroll County.

== Biography ==
Frank T. Newbelle was born in 1852.

Newbelle was a Democrat. He served as a member of the Maryland House of Delegates, representing Carroll County from 1878 to 1880.

He worked as a public school teacher in Carroll County. In the 1880s, he became a teacher at Upperco in Baltimore County.

Newbelle married Alice. They had four children, including Frank Harvey. He was a member of the Methodist Episcopal church and was superintendent of the Sabbath School. He died at his home near Houcksville, Maryland, on September 3, 1888. He was interred at Wesley Chapel.
