= Skirmish at Adamstown =

Battle of the American Civil War

- Part of the American Civil War
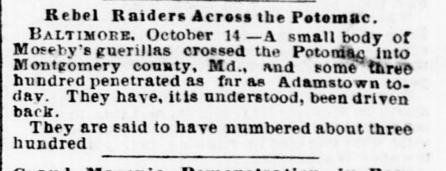
Date	October 14, 1864
Location	Frederick County, Maryland
Result	Inconclusive

Belligerents
United States (Union)	(Confederate States of America) CSA (Confederacy)

Commanders and leaders
Benjamin F. Kelley	John McCausland

Strength
Unknown	Unknown

Casualties and losses
Unknown killed and wounded	Unknown killed and wounded

The Skirmish at Adamstown was a battle recorded by Frederick H. Dyer in Dyer's Compendiumfought between "Mean's and Atwell's West Virginia Cavalry Companies" and guerilla Confederate companies in Adamstown, Frederick County, Maryland, on October 14, 1864.

According to dispatches in the Evening Star and The Daily Dispatch, three hundred of Mosby's Raiders came across the Potomac river to Adamstown, but were pushed back.

The Skirmish appears as the last battle fought in Maryland in Dyer's record. The result of the Battle was inconclusive.

The guerilla raid was notable as it was conducted the same day as Mosby's raiders conducted the Greenback raid, where they captured a train with over $200,000 in currency, as well as raided businesses in Poolesville, Maryland.
