= Henry William Hoffman =

American politician (1825-1895)

Sergeant at Arms of the United States House of Representatives
- In office February 3, 1860 – July 5, 1861

Member of the U.S. House of Representatives from Maryland's 5th congressional district
- In office March 4, 1855 – March 3, 1857

Personal details
- Born: November 10, 1825 Cumberland, Maryland, USA
- Died: July 28, 1895 (aged 69) Cumberland, Maryland, USA
- Party: American Party
- Education: Jefferson College
- Occupation: Politician, lawyer, judge

Henry William Hoffman (November 10, 1825 – July 28, 1895) was a U.S. representative from Maryland.

== Biography ==
Born in Cumberland, Maryland, Hoffman attended the public schools and Allegany County Academy. He graduated from Jefferson College (now Washington & Jefferson College) in Pennsylvania, in 1846. He studied law, and was admitted to the bar in 1848.

Hoffman was elected by the American Party to the Thirty-fourth Congress (March 4, 1855 – March 3, 1857). He was an unsuccessful candidate for reelection in 1857 to the Thirty-fifth Congress and for election in 1859 to the Thirty-sixth Congress. After his tenure in Congress, Hoffman served as treasurer of the Chesapeake & Ohio Canal Co. from 1858 to 1860.

Hoffman was elected Sergeant at Arms of the House of Representatives in the Thirty-sixth Congress and served from February 3, 1860, to July 5, 1861. He was appointed by President Abraham Lincoln as collector of customs at Baltimore, Maryland, and served from 1861 to 1866. He resumed the practice of law in Cumberland, Maryland.

Hoffman was elected associate judge of the sixth Maryland circuit court in 1883 and served until his death in Cumberland, Maryland, July 28, 1895. He is interred in Rose Hill Cemetery.

U.S. House of Representatives
| Preceded by Henry May | Member of the U.S. House of Representatives from Maryland's 5th congressional district 1855–1857 | Succeeded by Jacob Michael Kunkel |
| Preceded by Adam John Glossbrenner | Sergeant at Arms of the United States House of Representatives; 1860–1861 | Succeeded by Edward Ball |
