= Joseph Byers =

American politician (1824–1898)

Member of the Maryland House of Delegates from the Frederick County district
- In office 1868–1870 Serving with Ephraim Albaugh, Noah Bowlus, R. P. T. Dutrow, Thomas G. Maynard, Charles F. Wenner
- Preceded by: Henry Baker, Upton Buhrman, Thomas Gorsuch, John L. Linthicum, John R. Rouzer, John A. Steiner
- Succeeded by: Noah Bowlus, Henry R. Harris, John T. McCreery, J. Alfred Ritter, John B. Thomas, William White

Personal details
- Born: March 1824 Carroll County, Maryland, U.S.
- Died: April 11, 1898 (aged 74) near Emmitsburg, Maryland, U.S.
- Party: Democratic
- Spouse: Ellen Gilbert
- Children: 6
- Occupation: Politician; farmer

Joseph Byers (March 19, 1824 – April 11, 1898) was an American politician from Maryland. He served as a member of the Maryland House of Delegates, representing Frederick County from 1868 to 1870.

== Early life ==
Joseph Byers was born on March 19, 1824, in Carroll County, Maryland, to Margaret (née Dutterer) and Michael Byers.

== Career ==
Byers was a Democrat. He served as a member of the Maryland House of Delegates, representing Frederick County from 1868 to 1870.

Byers was a director of the Emmitsburg Railroad Company. He also worked as a farmer.

== Personal life ==
Byers married Ellen Gilbert. They had six children, George G., Jacob K., Margaret, Jeannette, Carrie Jane and Blanche M.

Byers died on April 11, 1898, at his "Pleasant Farm" home near Emmitsburg.
