= Thomas G. Maynard =

American politician (1809–1891)

Member of the Maryland House of Delegates from the Frederick County district
- In office 1868–1870 Serving with Ephraim Albaugh, Noah Bowlus, Joseph Byers, R. P. T. Dutrow, Charles F. Wenner
- Preceded by: Henry Baker, Upton Buhrman, Thomas Gorsuch, John L. Linthicum, John R. Rouzer, John A. Steiner
- Succeeded by: Noah Bowlus, Henry R. Harris, John T. McCreery, J. Alfred Ritter, John B. Thomas, William White

Personal details
- Born: Thomas Greenberry Maynard; 1809 Frederick County, Maryland, U.S.
- Died: July 14, 1891 (aged 81–82) Libertytown, Maryland, U.S.
- Resting place: Frederick County, Maryland, U.S.
- Party: Democratic
- Spouse: Anna Sollers
- Children: 7
- Occupation: Politician; merchant; farmer

Thomas Greenberry Maynard (1809 – July 14, 1891) was an American politician from Maryland. He served as a member of the Maryland House of Delegates, representing Frederick County from 1868 to 1870.

== Early life ==
Thomas Greenberry Maynard was born in 1809 in Frederick County, Maryland, to Brice Maynard. At a young age, he was orphaned.

== Career ==
Maynard started work as a clerk. At the age of 20, he worked as a merchant in Libertytown, Maryland. He remained in that business for eight years.

Maynard was a Democrat. He served as a member of the Maryland House of Delegates, representing Frederick County from 1868 to 1870.

After he married, Maynard purchased a 400 acres (160 ha) farm in Libertytown. He worked as a farmer and sold the farm (then 318 acres (129 ha)) in 1868.

== Personal life ==
Maynard married Anna (or Arianna) Sollers. They had seven children, S. S., Lavinia, Warren, Virginia, Clinton, Albert (or Allen) and Thomas B. He was a member of Methodist Church South.

Maynard died at his home in Libertytown on July 14, 1891, aged 82. He was buried at the Maynard burial grounds in Frederick County.
