= Henry R. Harris (Maryland politician) =

American politician (died 1878)

Member of the Maryland House of Delegates from the Frederick County district
- In office 1870–1872 Serving with Noah Bowlus, John T. McCreery, J. Alfred Ritter, John B. Thomas, William White
- Preceded by: Ephraim Albaugh, Noah Bowlus, Joseph Byers, R. P. T. Dutrow, Thomas G. Maynard, Charles F. Wenner
- Succeeded by: Theodore C. Delaplane, Charles W. Miller, Lycurgus N. Phillips, Jonathan Routzahn, Charles F. Rowe
- In office 1861–1864 Serving with Joshua Biggs, Hiram Buhrman, James M. Coale, Thomas Hammond, Thomas Johnson
- Preceded by: Thomas J. Claggett, John A. Johnson, Andrew Kessler, David W. Naill, Jonathan Routzahn, William E. Salmon
- Succeeded by: Joshua Biggs, Upton Buhrman, Thomas Hammond, David Rinehart, Oliver P. Snyder, Charles E. Trail

Personal details
- Died: November 23, 1878
- Party: Democratic
- Occupation: Politician

Henry R. Harris (died November 23, 1878) was an American politician from Maryland.

== Biography ==
Henry R. Harris served as a member of the Maryland House of Delegates, representing Frederick County from 1861 to 1864 and from 1870 to 1872. From 1870 to 1872, he was affiliated with the Democratic Party.

Harris died on November 23, 1878.
