= Henry Vanderford =

American politician and newspaperman (1811–1894)

Member of the Maryland Senate from the Carroll County district
- In office 1880–1884
- Preceded by: James Fenner Lee
- Succeeded by: Thomas H. Shriver

Member of the Maryland House of Delegates from the Carroll County district
- In office 1874–1876 Serving with Thomas C. Brown, Henry Galt, Somerset R. Waters
- Preceded by: Harrison H. Lamotte, Lewis A. J. Lamotte, Trusten Polk, James H. Steele
- Succeeded by: Frank Brown, Harrison H. Lamotte, Jacob Rinehart, Somerset R. Waters

Personal details
- Born: December 23, 1811 Hillsborough, Caroline County, Maryland, U.S.
- Died: January 27, 1894 (aged 82) Westminster, Maryland, U.S.
- Resting place: Ascension Protestant Episcopal Church
- Party: Democratic
- Spouse: Angelina Vanderford (m. 1839; died 1889)
- Children: 12
- Occupation: Politician; newspaperman; farmer

Henry Vanderford (December 23, 1811 – January 27, 1894) was an American politician and newspaperman from Maryland. He served as a member of the Maryland House of Delegates, representing Carroll County from 1874 to 1876, and served in the Maryland Senate from 1880 to 1884.

== Early life ==
Henry Vanderford was born on December 23, 1811, in Hillsborough, Caroline County, Maryland, to Elizabeth (née Frampton) and William Vanderford. His father was of Queen Anne's County where the Vanderford family owned 1,000 acres (400 ha) of land. He studied at Hillsborough Academy and moved to Talbot County with his family and attended school there. In 1825, he entered the office of Thomas Perrin Smith of the Easton Star. He studied the printing business and later joined the Easton Whig.

== Career ==
In 1835, Vanderford purchased the Caroline Advocate in Denton. He continued publishing the paper until 1837, when he moved the business to Centreville and published the Centreville Sentinel in January 1838. In 1842, he sold the Centreville Sentinel and moved to Baltimore. In 1845, he published a weekly literary and educational paper called The Ray. In 1846, he published the Democratic papers Baltimore Daily News and the Weekly Statesman under the firm Adams, Vanderford & Brown. He was appointed by Governor William Grason as chief judge of the magistrate's court, but he declined each appointment. In 1840, he was appointed as deputy marshal for Queen Anne's County and acted as the census taker.

In February 1848, he bought the Cecil Democrat in Elkton from Thomas M. Coleman. The paper opposed succession, but also the Abraham Lincoln administration. He expanded the paper and quadrupled its circulation. He managed the paper for 17 years. In 1865, he sold the paper to Albert Constable and Frederick Stump. He retired to a farm on the Patuxent River in St. Mary's County for three years. In 1868, Vanderford founded the Middletown Transcript in Middletown, Delaware, and acted as publisher and printer. In 1870, he transferred the paper to his son Charles H. In November 1870, he moved to Westminster, Maryland, and became the principal editor of The Democratic Advocate alongside his son William H. He remained in that role until 1880.

Vanderford was a Democrat. He was active in the reform movement in 1836. He served as a member of the Maryland House of Delegates, representing Carroll County from 1874 to 1876. He also served in the Maryland Senate, representing Carroll County from 1880 to 1884. He was chairman of the committee on finance and a member of the committee on engrossed bills and the committee on printing.

== Personal life ==
Vanderford married Angelina Vanderford, daughter of Henry Vanderford of Queen Anne's County and a distant relative, on June 6, 1839. They had twelve children, including William H., Charles H. and Julian J. His wife died in 1889. He was a Mason. He was a vestryman and member of the Ascension Protestant Episcopal Church.

Vanderford died on January 27, 1894, at his home in Westminster. He was buried at the Ascension Protestant Episcopal Church in Westminster.
