= Charles F. Wenner =

American politician (died 1882)

Member of the Maryland House of Delegates from the Frederick County district
- In office 1868–1870 Serving with Ephraim Albaugh, Noah Bowlus, Joseph Byers, R. P. T. Dutrow, Thomas G. Maynard
- Preceded by: Henry Baker, Upton Buhrman, Thomas Gorsuch, John L. Linthicum, John R. Rouzer, John A. Steiner
- Succeeded by: Noah Bowlus, Henry R. Harris, John T. McCreery, J. Alfred Ritter, John B. Thomas, William White

Personal details
- Died: June 5, 1882 (aged 62) Berlin, Frederick County, Maryland, U.S.
- Party: Democratic
- Occupation: Politician; merchant

Charles F. Wenner (died June 5, 1882) was an American politician and grain merchant from Maryland. He served as a member of the Maryland House of Delegates, representing Frederick County from 1868 to 1870.

== Career ==
Charles F. Wenner served as a member of the Maryland House of Delegates, representing Frederick County from 1868 to 1870. In 1879, he ran again to represent Frederick County in the House of Delegates, but lost.

Wenner worked as a grain merchant. In April 1861, he wrote a letter to Governor Thomas H. Hicks about the seizure of his grain en route to Georgetown on the Chesapeake and Ohio Canal by military troops. His warehouses in Berlin were seized during the Civil War for belief he was aiding the Confederates, but in 1863, the Secretary of the Treasury withdrew the lawsuits. In 1870, he built a new section to a mill originally owned by George H. Hogan. In 1872, he began working with miller Walper G. Musgrove in Berlin. The firm of grain merchants Wenner, Jordan & Company formed in 1879. Wenner partnered with Christian Smith in that enterprise and worked as a senior partner. After his death, the firm was renamed Jordan, Crampton & Company.

== Personal life ==
Wenner lived in Berlin. He had a stroke on May 4, 1882. He had three additional strokes and died at his home in Berlin on June 5, 1882, aged 62.
