= Theodore C. Delaplane =

American politician (died 1900)

Member of the Maryland House of Delegates from the Frederick County district
- In office 1872–1874 Serving with Charles W. Miller, Lycurgus N. Phillips, Jonathan Routzahn, Charles F. Rowe
- Preceded by: Noah Bowlus, Henry R. Harris, John T. McCreery, J. Alfred Ritter, John B. Thomas, William White
- Succeeded by: Andrew Annan, John A. Koons, Lewis Lamar, Job M. Miller, John L. Nicodemus

Personal details
- Died: April 13, 1900 (aged 90) Frederick, Maryland, U.S.
- Party: Republican
- Occupation: Politician

Theodore C. Delaplane (died April 13, 1900) was an American politician from Maryland.

== Biography ==
Theodore C. Delaplane was a Republican. He served as a member of the Maryland House of Delegates, representing Frederick County from 1872 to 1874. In April 1884, he was elected by the county commissioners to the board of charities and corrections for Frederick County.

Delaplane had a son, William T. Delaplane died at his home in Frederick on April 13, 1900, aged 90.
