= Buckingham House and Industrial School Complex =

Historic buildings in Maryland, United States

- U.S. National Register of Historic Places
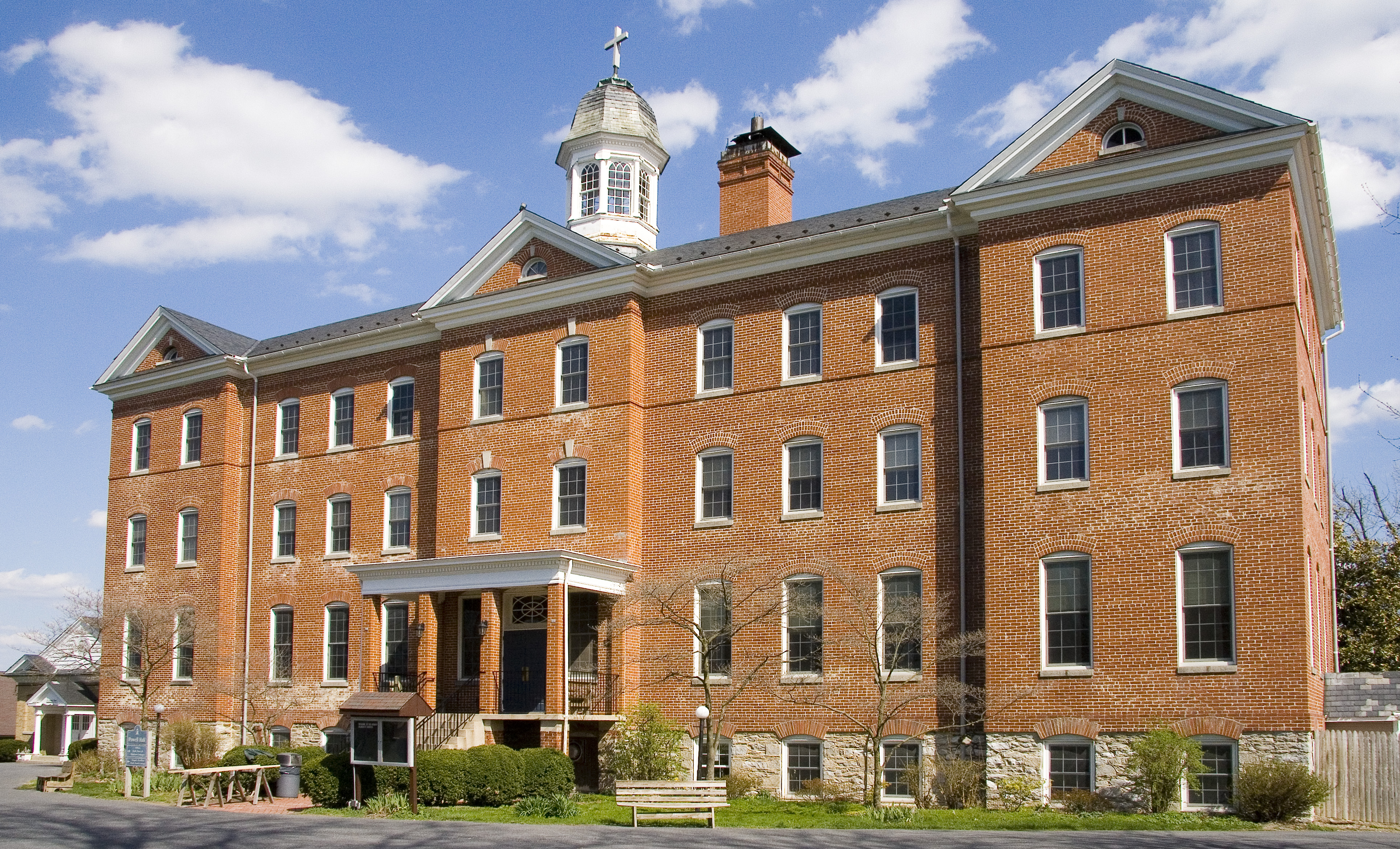
- Buckingham School, April 2009

- Location within Maryland Location within the United States
- Location: Off Maryland Routes 80 and 85, Buckeystown, Maryland
- Coordinates: 39°18′52″N 77°25′26″W
- Area: 310 acres (130 ha)
- Built: 1750
- Architectural style: Colonial Revival
- NRHP reference No.: 82002812
- Added to NRHP: May 20, 1982

The Buckingham House and Industrial School Complex is a historic trade school complex located near Buckeystown, Frederick County, Maryland. It consists of thirteen buildings associated with a trade school for boys from poor families that operated from 1898 to 1944. The complex centers on a 3-story dormitory building built for the school, but also includes the late 18th-century Federal style Buckingham House. The surrounding farm was, uniquely for the area, irrigated. Bordering the Monocacy River, the grounds include several significant late Woodland period archeological sites.

After the school closed, the property was donated to the Episcopal Diocese of Maryland. It became a youth camp and then a conference center named after the first bishop ordained in Maryland, the Rev. Claggett.

It was added to the National Register of Historic Places in 1982.
