= John C. Motter House =

Historic house in Maryland, US

- U.S. National Register of Historic Places
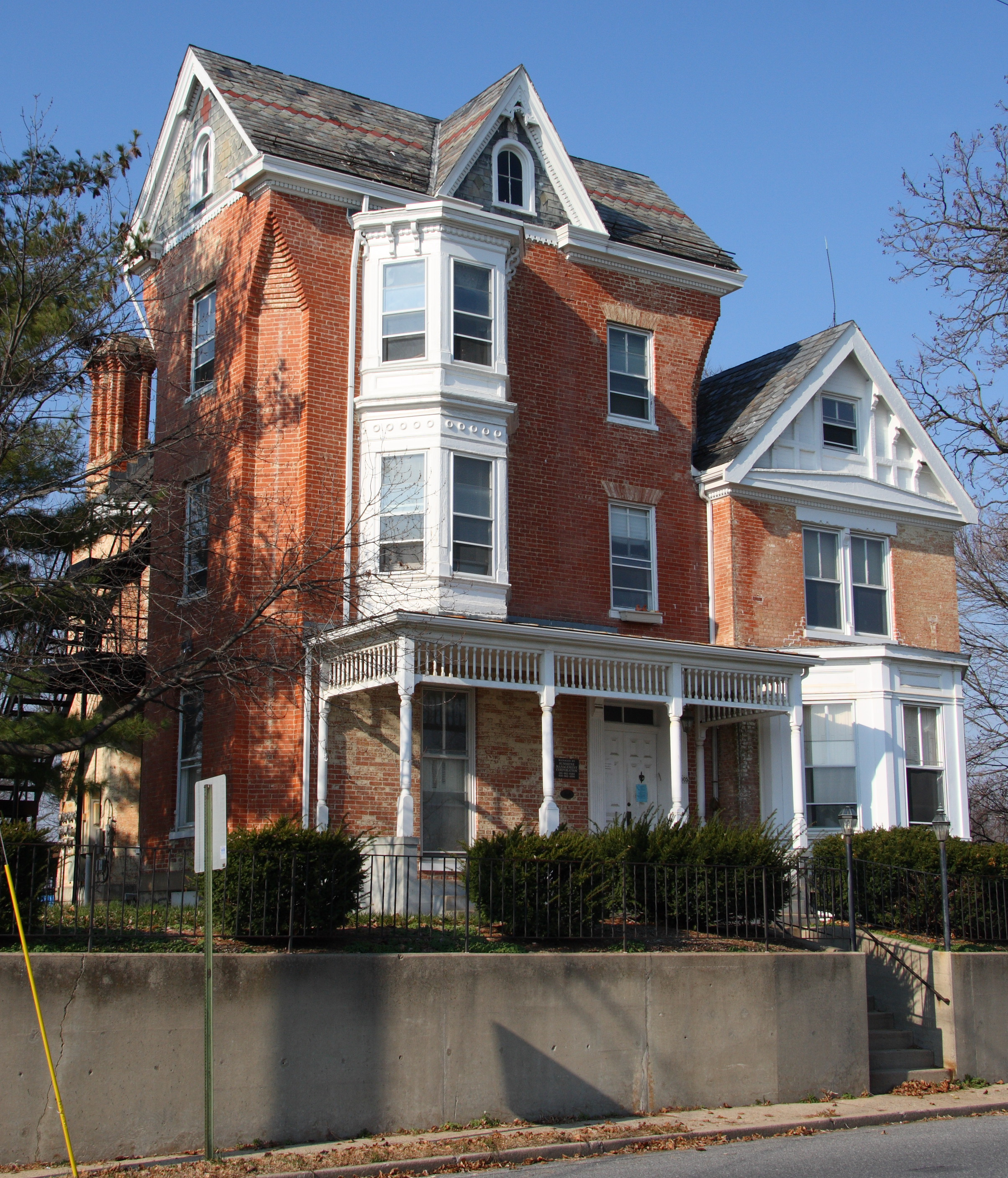

- Location within Maryland Location within the United States
- Location: 1005 Motter Ave., Frederick, Maryland
- Coordinates: 39°25′38″N 77°24′38″W
- Area: less than one acre
- Built: 1880
- Architectural style: Queen Anne
- NRHP reference No.: 82001592
- Added to NRHP: December 2, 1982

The John C. Motter House is a Queen Anne style house built circa 1880, located in Frederick, Maryland. The 3½ story house features beveled corners with brick corbels. The house was built in what was then a rural area beyond the north end of Frederick. The house is associated with Judge John C. Motter of the Maryland Sixth Judicial Circuit Court, who resided there from the 1880s to 1914.

The house is used as offices.
