= John H. McElfresh =

American politician (1796–1841)

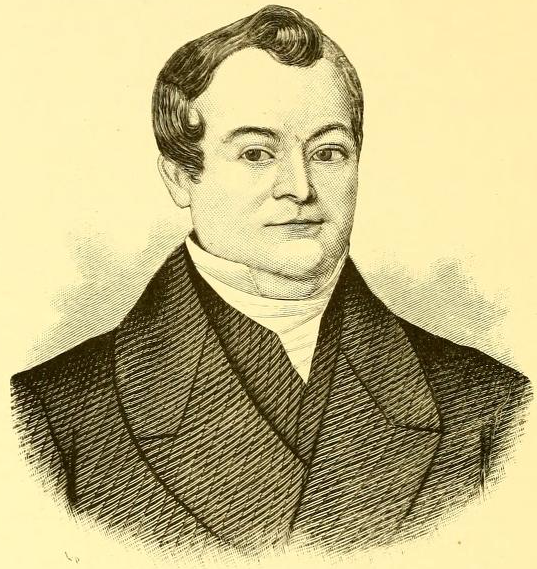
- Sketch of McElfresh in a 1882 publication

Member of the Maryland House of Delegates from the Frederick County district
- In office 1830–1830 Serving with David Kemp, Evan McKinstry, Davis Richardson
- Preceded by: Roderick Dorsey, John Kinzer, Isaac Shriver, Francis Thomas
- Succeeded by: William Cost Johnson, Abraham Jones, Evan McKinstry, Davis Richardson

Personal details
- Born: John Hammond McElfresh; May 27, 1796 near New Market, Maryland, U.S.
- Died: August 4, 1841 (aged 45) near New Market, Maryland, U.S.
- Spouse: Teresa Mantz (m. 1820)
- Children: Henry McElfresh
- Education: Frederick College
- Alma mater: University of Maryland School of Medicine (MD)
- Occupation: Politician; lawyer; physician

John Hammond McElfresh (May 27, 1796 – August 4, 1841) was an American politician from Maryland.

== Early life ==
John Hammond McElfresh was born on May 27, 1796, near New Market, Frederick County, Maryland, to Ariana (née Hammond) and Henry McElfresh. He attended Frederick College. He studied medicine under Dr. L. T. Hammond of Anne Arundel County. He graduated from the University of Maryland School of Medicine in 1817 with a Doctor of Medicine. He later studied law under John Nelson and was admitted to the bar in 1825.

== Career ==
After graduating as a physician, McElfresh practiced medicine in Frederick until 1822. In 1820, he was selected as register of Frederick and as trustee of the Frederick Academy. After being admitted to the bar, he practiced law.

McElfresh served as a member of the Maryland House of Delegates in 1830. While delegate, he fought for a law to abolish imprisonment for debt. In 1831, Governor Daniel Martin appointed McElfresh as a colonel on his staff. He was a member of the state reform convention in November 1836. McElfresh was a member of Frederick's first fire company.

== Personal life ==
McElfresh married Teresa Mantz, daughter of Francis Mantz, on March 27, 1820. They had several children, including Anna Mary, Ariana and Henry. His daughter Anna Mary married Jacob M. Kunkel and his daughter Ariana married Charles Edward Trail. His son Henry was also a member of the Maryland House of Delegates.

McElfresh died on August 4, 1841, at the home of his father near New Market.
