= Jacob M. Kunkel =

American politician (1822–1870)

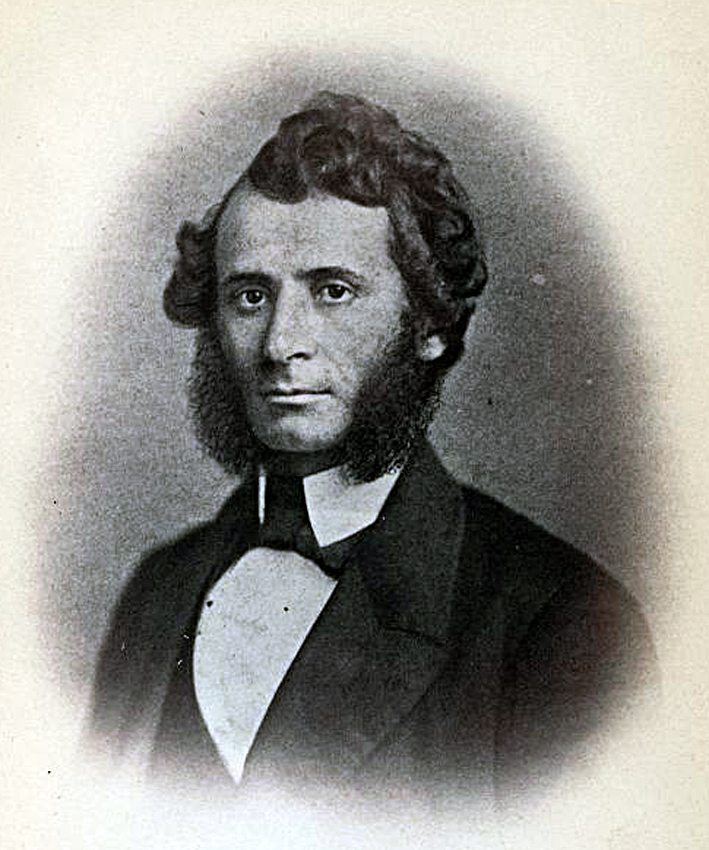

Member of the U.S. House of Representatives from Maryland's 5th district
- In office March 4, 1857 – March 3, 1861
- Preceded by: Henry William Hoffman
- Succeeded by: Francis Thomas

Member of the Maryland Senate from the Frederick County district
- In office 1852–1854
- Preceded by: David W. Naill
- Succeeded by: William Bradley Tyler

Personal details
- Born: Jacob Michael Kunkel; July 1822 Frederick, Maryland, U.S.
- Died: April 7, 1870 (aged 47) Frederick, Maryland, U.S.
- Resting place: Mount Olivet Cemetery
- Party: Democratic
- Spouse: Anna Mary McElfresh (m. 1848)
- Children: 3
- Education: University of Virginia
- Profession: Politician, lawyer

Jacob Michael Kunkel (July 1822 – April 7, 1870) was a U.S. Representative from Maryland.

== Early life ==
Jacob Michael Kunkel was born on July 13 (or 24), 1822 in Frederick, Maryland, to Elizabeth (née Barker) and John Kunkel. His father served in the War of 1812. His great-grandfather John Kunkel served with Frederick the Great and his maternal grandfather William served in the Revolutionary War. He attended the Frederick Academy for Boys, St. John's Catholic Seminary and Frederick College. He graduated from the University of Virginia at Charlottesville in 1843. He studied law under Joseph M. Palmer and in the office of Francis Thomas and was admitted to the bar in 1845 or 1846.

== Career ==
Kunkel began to practice law in Frederick in 1846. He was a law partner with Governor Francis Thomas around the late 1840s. He also partnered with his brother John B. Kunkel in Catoctin Furnace. As a Democrat, he was elected as a member of the Maryland Senate, defeating Gideon Bantz. He represented Frederick County in the senate from 1852 to 1854.

Kunkel was elected as a Democrat to the Thirty-fifth and Thirty-sixth Congresses (March 4, 1857 – March 3, 1861), defeating Henry W. Hoffman.

Afterward, he resumed the practice of law in Frederick. He served as delegate to the Loyalist Convention in Philadelphia in 1866.

== Personal life ==
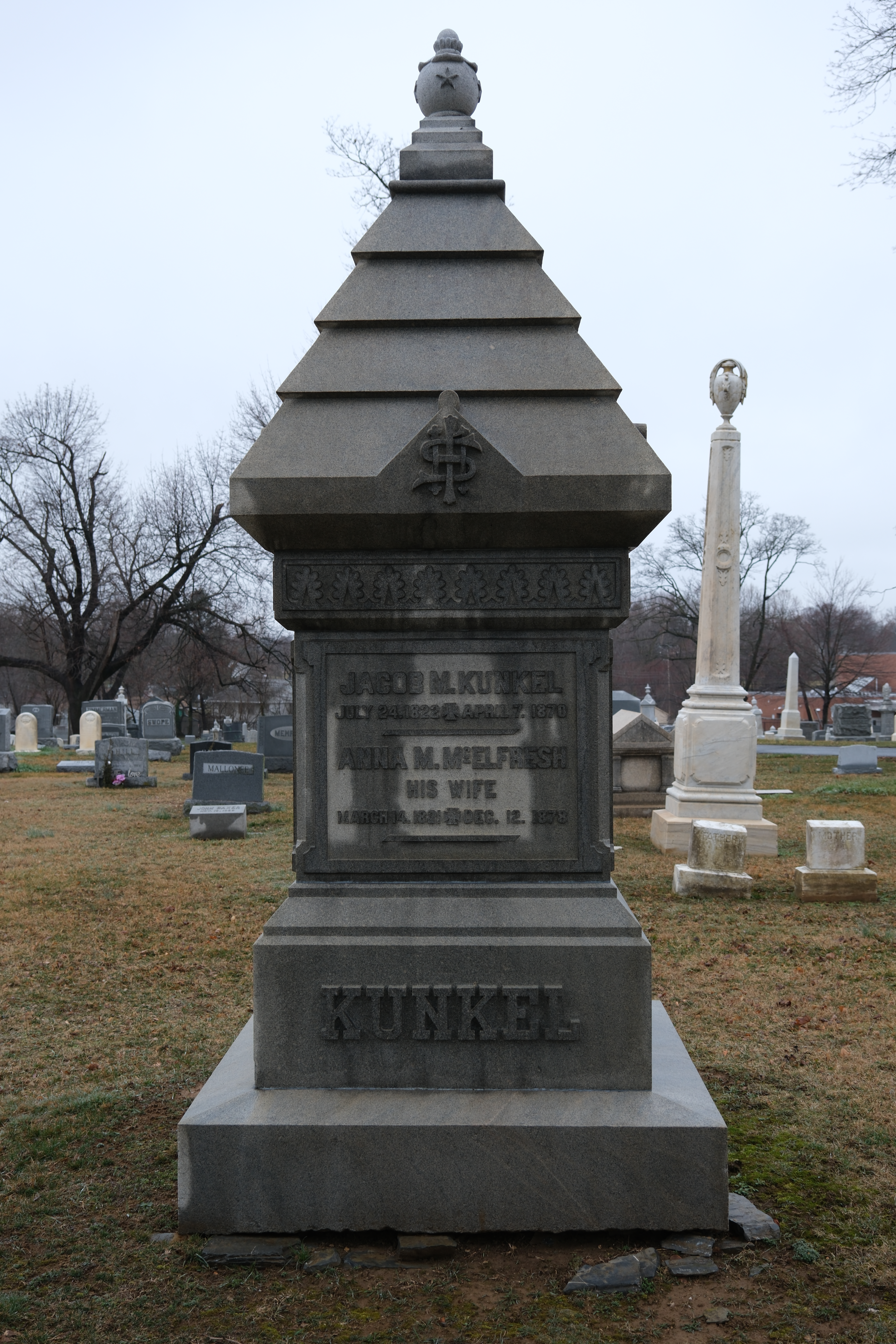
Grave of Kunkel in Mount Olivet Cemetery

Kunkel married Anna Mary McElfresh, daughter of John H. McElfresh, on January 3, 1848. They had three children. He was a vestryman of the Protestant Episcopal Church.

Kunkel died of consumption at his home in Frederick on April 7, 1870. He was interred in Mount Olivet Cemetery in Frederick.

U.S. House of Representatives
Preceded by Henry William Hoffman	Member of the U.S. House of Representatives from Maryland's 5th congressional district 1857–1861	Succeeded by Francis Thomas
