= Lewis M. Motter =

American politician (1815–1910)

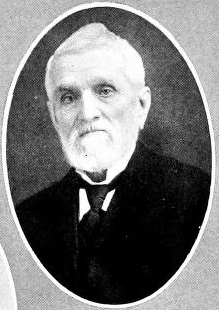
- Motter in a 1914 publication

Member of the Maryland House of Delegates from the Frederick County district
- In office 1854–1856 Serving with William T. Gittings, James J. Johnson, William E. Salmon, William C. Sappington, David Thomas
- Preceded by: William P. Anderson, James M. Coale, George W. Ent, James M. Geyer, John Lee, Davis Richardson
- Succeeded by: Lawrence J. Brengle, James S. Carper, James L. Davis, Daniel Grove, Peter Hauver, William N. Wolfe

Personal details
- Born: Lewis Martin Motter; February 6, 1815 Emmitsburg, Maryland, U.S.
- Died: April 27, 1910 (aged 95) Emmitsburg, Maryland, U.S.
- Resting place: Lutheran Cemetery
- Party: Whig; Democratic
- Spouse: Alice Rudisel (m. 1840)
- Children: 8
- Relatives: Joshua Motter (brother)
- Occupation: Politician; tanner; farmer

Lewis Martin Motter (February 6, 1815 – April 27, 1910) was an American politician from Maryland. He served as a member of the Maryland House of Delegates, representing Frederick County from 1854 to 1856.

== Early life ==
Lewis Martin Motter was born on February 6, 1815, in Emmitsburg, Maryland, to Mary M. (née Martin) and Lewis Motter. He was raised in Emmitsburg.

== Career ==
At the age of 23, Motter took over the family's tannery after the death of his father. He also took over the family's homestead and worked as a farmer. From 1849 to 1863, he was a stockholder and director of Bank of Gettysburg in Gettysburg, Pennsylvania. He also served as director of the Gettysburg National Bank from 1864 to 1903.

Motter was a Whig. He served as a member of the Maryland House of Delegates, representing Frederick County from 1854 to 1856. After the Civil War, he affiliated with the Democratic Party.

== Personal life ==
Motter married Alice Rudisel, daughter of Ludwig Rudisel, of Taneytown in 1840. They had eight children, Joshua S., Isaac M., Lewis Edwin, Carrie May, Grace, Ellen, Alice and William. His son Isaac was a minister of the Reformed Church and school commissioner in Frederick. His sister Elizabeth married Andrew Annan, his brother William was a judge of the circuit court and his brother Joshua was a member of the Maryland House of Delegates.

Motter died on April 27, 1910, at his home in Emmitsburg. He was buried in the Lutheran Cemetery.
