= Thomas H. Shriver =

American politician (1846–1916)

Thomas Herbert Shriver
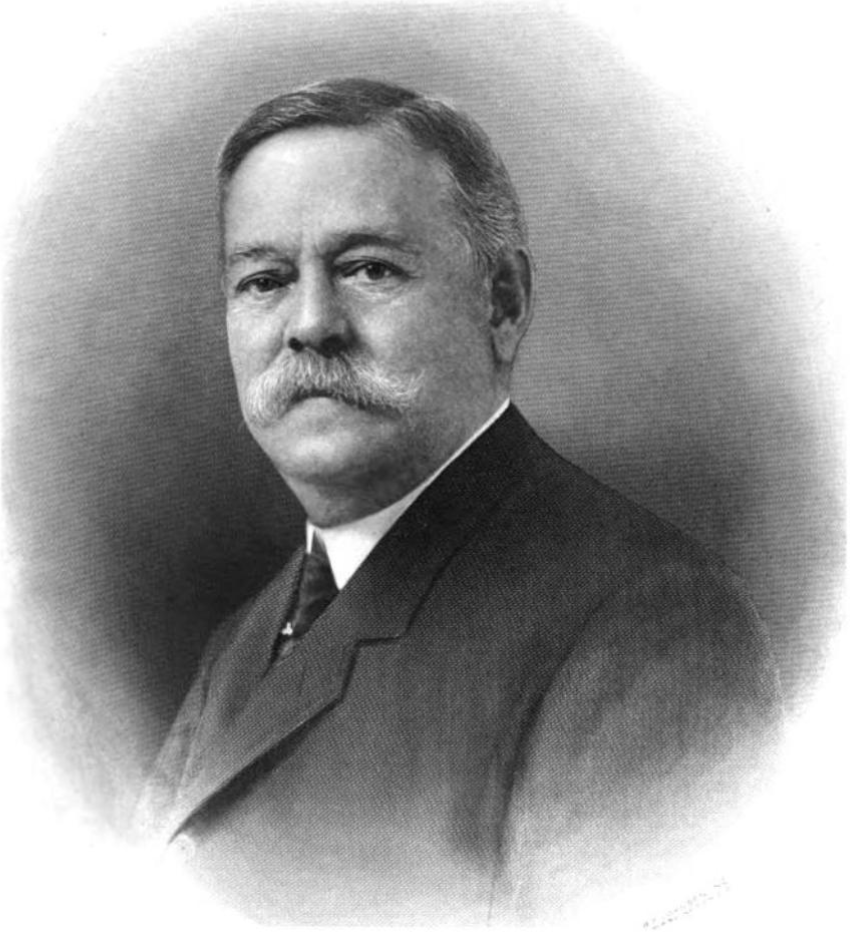

Member of the Maryland Senate
- In office 1884–1886
- Preceded by: Henry Vanderford
- Succeeded by: Pinkney J. Bennett

Member of the Maryland House of Delegates
- In office 1878–1880 Serving with Frank Brown, Frank T. Newbelle, Robert Sellman Jr., Benjamin F. Crouse, William T. Smith
- Preceded by: Frank Brown, Harrison H. Lamotte, Jacob Rinehart, Somerset R. Waters
- Succeeded by: Joseph W. Berret, Henry Galt, Edward W. Leeds, David A. C. Webster

Personal details
- Born: February 19, 1846 Union Mills, Maryland, U.S.
- Died: December 31, 1916 (aged 70) Union Mills, Maryland, U.S.
- Party: Democratic
- Spouse: Elizabeth R. Lawson (m. 1880)
- Children: 4
- Relatives: David Shriver; Sargent Shriver (grandson)
- Education: Virginia Military Institute
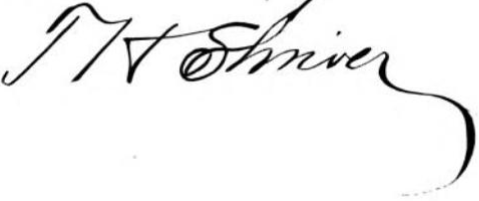
- Signature
- Military career
- Allegiance: Confederate States of America
- Branch: Confederate States Army
- Service years: 1863–1865
- Conflicts: American Civil War; Battle of Gettysburg; Battle of New Market

Thomas Herbert Shriver (February 19, 1846 – December 31, 1916) was an American politician. He served on the Maryland House of Delegates and the Maryland Senate.

== Early life ==
Thomas Herbert Shriver was born on February 19, 1846, in Union Mills, Maryland, to Mary M. J. (née Owings) and William Shriver. His father was a farmer and a miller. He was a descendant of an early settler to Carroll County, David Shriver. Shriver attended local schools and was taught by private tutors. He was preparing for enrollment to college when the American Civil War started.

== Career ==
Shriver enlisted in the Confederate States Army on June 28, 1863, at the age of seventeen, as General Stuart's cavalry passed by. He took part in the Battle of Gettysburg and cavalry engagements after the retreat of the army to Northern Virginia after the battle. In the last year, Shriver was detailed as a student of the Virginia Military Institute and became a member of the cadet corps and participated in the Battle of New Market. On May 15, 1865, Shriver surrendered and returned to Baltimore. In 1882, Shriver would receive a diploma from Virginia Military Institute for his participation in the Battle of New Market.

Shriver worked in a variety of occupations, including clerical positions, traveling salesman, farmer, miller and banker. With his brother Benjamin F. Shriver, he owned and operated B. F. Shriver Company of Carroll County, a cannery of fruits and vegetables. In 1904, the company was incorporated and Shriver became the president.

Shriver was a Democrat. From 1878 to 1882, Shriver served as a member of the Maryland House of Delegates, representing Carroll County. From 1884 to 1886, he served as a member of the Maryland Senate, representing Carroll County. In 1888, he was appointed as deputy collector of the Port of Baltimore. In 1908, Shriver was a delegate to the Democratic National Convention.

== Personal life ==
Shriver was a Roman Catholic. He had a home in Union Mills and would often host his friend, Cardinal James Gibbons. Shriver was given the title "general" due to his service on the staffs of Governors Henry Lloyd and Elihu Emory Jackson.

Shriver married Elizabeth R. Lawson on February 16, 1880. They had four children: Hilda, Joseph N., Robert T. and William H. Shriver. Shriver died on December 31, 1916, at his home in Union Mills. His grandson Sargent Shriver helped to establish the Peace Corps and was the Democratic nominee for Vice President in 1972.
