= Carrollton Manor =

Historic house in Maryland, United States

- U.S. National Register of Historic Places
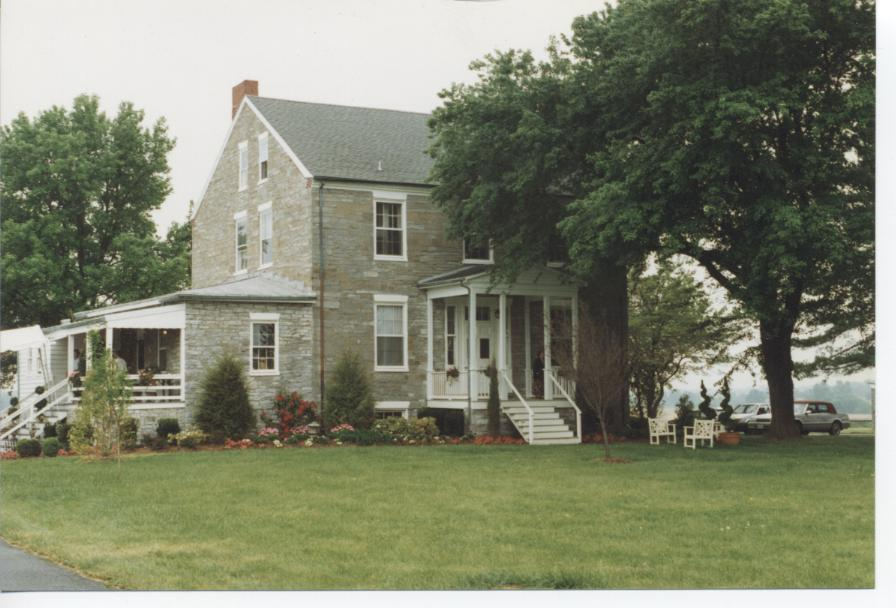
- Manor House on Manor Woods Road

- Location within Maryland Location within the United States
- Location: 5809 Manor Woods Rd., Buckeystown, Maryland
- Coordinates: 39°19′28″N 77°28′12″W
- Area: 32 acres (13 ha)
- Built: 1820
- Architectural style: Greek Revival, Federal, Early Republic
- NRHP reference No.: 97001294
- Added to NRHP: November 17, 1997

Carrollton Manor was a 17,000 acre (69 km^{2}) tract of land in Frederick County, Maryland, United States, which extended from the Potomac River on the south, Catoctin Mountain to the west, the Monocacy River to the east, and Ballenger Creek to the north. It included the towns of Lime Kiln, Buckeystown, Adamstown, Doubs, Licksville, Tuscarora, and Point of Rocks.

Charles Carroll of Annapolis granted the entire estate to his son, Charles Carroll of Carrollton. It is from this tract of land that he took his title, "Charles Carroll of Carrollton." While Charles Carroll of Carrollton never lived on Carrollton Manor, he erected a manor house there, Tuscarora, where he spent a few days or weeks at a time. The eldest daughter of Charles Carroll of Carrollton married Richard Caton and was the mother of the "three American graces" who married British noble men: the eldest, Marianne, marrying the Marquess Wellesley, K.G., a brother of the 1st Duke of Wellington; the second, Louisa Catherine, first to Sir Felton Hervey-Bathurst, 1st Baronet and later the 7th Duke of Leeds; and the third, Elizabeth, the 8th Lord Stafford. These titled ladies continued for years to retain possession of portions of the manor and to collect large rental revenue from the estate's many fertile farms. The manor house was the home of his favorite granddaughter, Marianne Caton, and her husband, Robert Patterson.

The house is a two-story house of Federal architecture, built of native limestone circa 1820, situated in Adamstown, Maryland. Originally the house had 14 rooms; more were added later until there were 21. The walls are twenty-four inches thick, the floors are oak, and many doors still have the original latches. Partitions through most of the house are solid brick. Beyond the wide front door is a rectangular reception hall with access to the rooms. There are twin drawing rooms and a stairway that sweeps from the basement to the attic. Each room has its fireplace. The manor house was listed on the National Register of Historic Places in 1997.

The manor hummed with industry in the early 19th century, with mills operated by water power built on the Monocacy River to grind grain. Wheat supplanted tobacco in Carroll's agricultural policy. Kilns were established to burn lime to fertilize the fields.

The Pattersons lived at Tuscarora for only a few years. When cholera broke out in the neighborhood, they fled to Baltimore, Maryland, but Mr. Patterson died a few days later. After Mr. Patterson's death, Tuscarora was occupied by tenants. The Manor was reduced by being divided into small farms until only about two thousand acres (8 km^{2}) remained.

After the death of Charles Carroll of Carrollton, the estate was deeded to his descendants. Since the heirs of Charles Carroll were scattered over the world, they employed agents or overseers to look after their interests. Soon most of Carrollton Manor had been sold or leased. Among the large purchasers was Louis McMurray, the first to start the corn canning industry in Frederick County. He also canned peas and other vegetables. Two large canning plants were located on Carrollton Manor, one at Buckeystown, Maryland, controlled by the Baker Brothers, and the other at Adamstown controlled by the Thomas Brothers.

Careless tenants neglected and abused Tuscarora. Turkeys were raised in a bedroom, hogs in the basement and cured hams dripped from the attic. The descendants held Carrollton Manor as absentee landlords until around 1923 when it was bought by the Baker family. About 1949 two of the original farms of the Manor were sold to Mr. & Mrs. Pascal Renn. They made extensive improvements to Tuscarora and furnished it with antiques and reproductions of the colonial period. It was thrown open for a Garden Pilgrimage in 1953. Surprisingly the banisters and stairway survived and the woodwork was in good condition and the cupboards, inner window shutters and doors stayed in place. In the 1950s, the Renns sold the farm to Eastalco, which erected a large aluminum plant on the farm. Tuscarora is still standing and is used by Eastalco's successor owner, Alcoa as guest house and meeting center.

There is also a Carrollton Manor community in Anne Arundel County, Maryland.

== Sources ==
- Hume, Charlotte; Edith Yingling (3 March 1971). The History of Carrollton Manor (PDF). Adamstown, Maryland: Adamstown Homemakers Club. Archived from the original (PDF) on 18 January 2007.
- William, Thomas; Folger McKinsey (1979). History of Frederick County, MD. Genealogical Publishing Com.
