= George Schley =

American politician (1813–1890)

George Schley (January 27, 1813 – April 11, 1890) was an American politician and attorney. He served in the Maryland House of Delegates and the Maryland Senate. He was also a member of the Maryland Constitutional Convention of 1850.

== Early life ==
Schley was born in Frederick, Maryland, January 27, 1813. He was the eldest child of Eliza A. (née McCannon) and Frederick A. Schley. He attended Frederick School. He then enrolled in a private school in Massachusetts that was operated by Rev. Jonathan Woodbridge.

Schley entered Yale College for his sophomore year in 1829. After leaving Yale in 1830, he attended the University of Virginia, graduating in 1833 in ancient and modern languages. He, then, studied at Bear's chemical works in Carroll County, Maryland, for six months.

Schley read law in his father's office in Frederick, was admitted to the bar in 1836.

== Career ==
In 1836, Schley began the practice of law in Frederick, Maryland. Soon after, has nominated for the Maryland House of Delegates as a Whig, but failed to make the ticket. In 1838, he was elected to the Maryland House of Delegates. In May 1839, Schley moved to Hagerstown, Maryland, where he continued to practice law.

He was a member of the Maryland Constitutional Convention of 1850. In 1852 he was elected to the Maryland State Senate. He was reelected in 1854 and 1856. After the end of the Whig Party, he became a Democrat. In 1862, he declined a nomination for the US Congress. He was unsuccessful in a campaign to be an associate justice of the Fourth Judicial Circuit in 1872.

Schley was president of the First National Bank of Hagerstown from 1873 until his death.

== Personal life ==
In June 1839, Schley married Mary Sophia Hall. She was the daughter of Thomas B. Hall, Esq. and the grandniece of chief justice John Buchanan. The couple had two daughters and one son who died in early manhood. His wife died in 1880.

Schley was a member of the Presbyterian Church.

In 1889, Schley had a stroke that caused the paralysis of his vocal organs. Several months later, a second stroke impacted his memory. Schley died from congestion of the lungs at his residence on West Washington Street in Hagerstown, on April 11, 1890, at the age of 87 years. He was buried in the family plot in the local Episcopal Church.
