= Adamstown, Maryland =

Adamstown
- Census-designated place
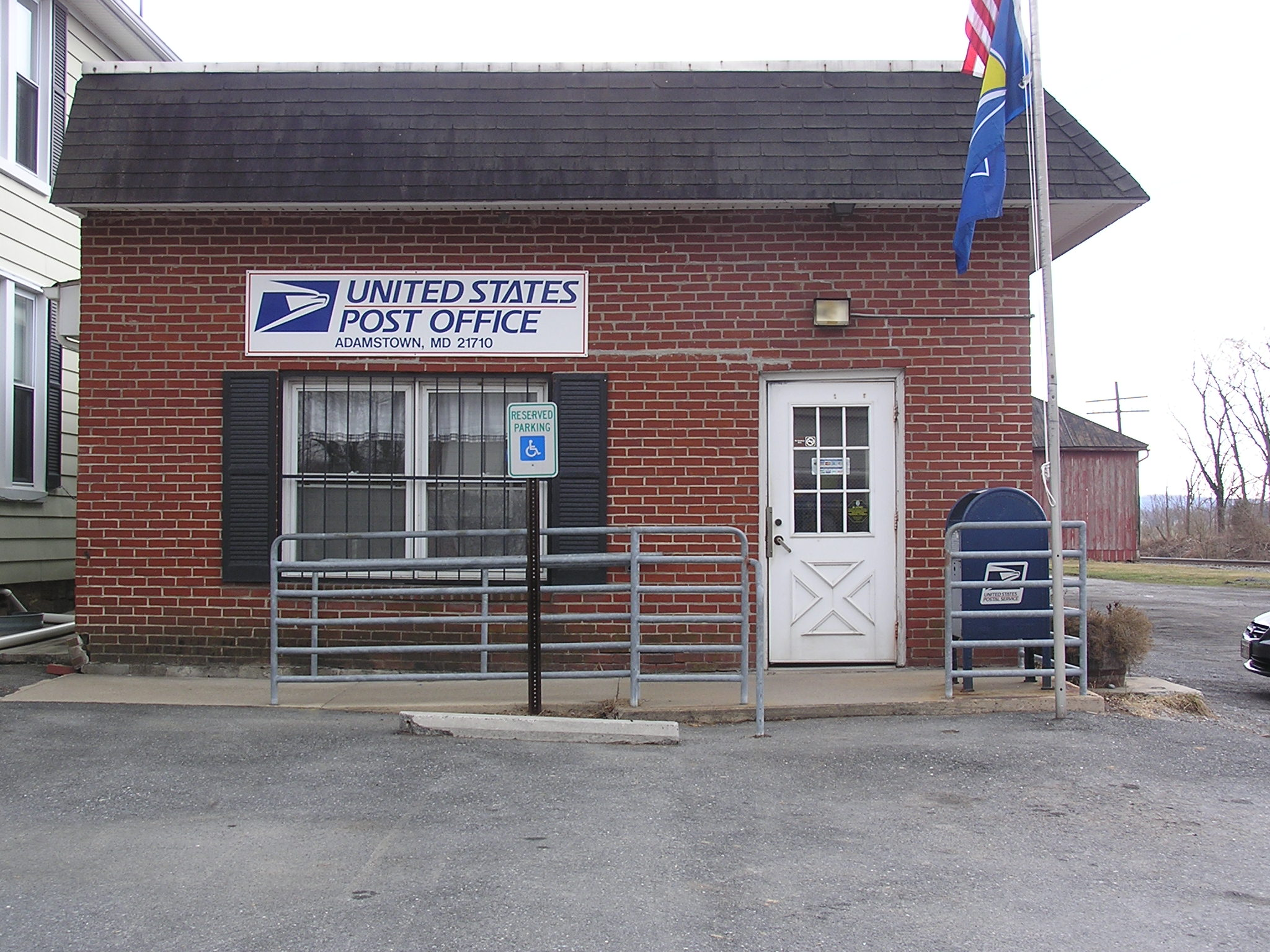
- The Adamstown post office in March 2004

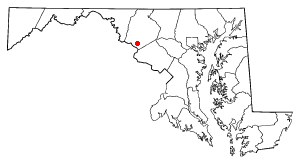
- Coordinates: 39°18′25″N 77°28′09″W
- Country: United States
- State: Maryland
- County: Frederick
- First named: 1840

Area
  - Total: 1.07 sq mi (2.76 km^{2})
  - Land: 1.07 sq mi (2.76 km^{2})
  - Water: 0 sq mi (0.00 km^{2})
- Elevation: 312 ft (95 m)

Population (2020)
  - Total: 2,331
  - Density: 2,190.8/sq mi (845.87/km^{2})
- ZIP code: 21710
- Area codes: 240 and 301
- FIPS code: 24-00350
- GNIS feature ID: 2583568

Adamstown is an unincorporated community and census-designated place (CDP) in Frederick County, Maryland, United States. It is named for Adam Kohlenberg (March 11, 1819 – January 1, 1868), a station agent and first town merchant who owned much of present-day Adamstown. As of the 2020 census, the Adamstown CDP had a population of 2,331.

== History ==
Adamstown lies in the fertile valley between Sugarloaf and Catoctin Mountain on the former Carrollton Manor, a 17,000-acre (69 km^{2}) estate originally owned by Charles Carroll of Carrollton. Until 2000, it was a little-altered representative of mid-19th century linear town planning. It is significant in architecture for its variety of structures, including residential, commercial, industrial, educational, agricultural, and religious buildings. The late 18th century road from Jefferson to Greenfield Mills on the Monocacy River, originally called the Bridal Road, followed the route of the present-day Mountville Road. The 1832 arrival of the railroad to the manor created the economic and transportation impetus for the development of the community.

Adamstown was first known as "Davis' Warehouse" because Dr. Meredith Davis, a leading Quaker county miller, built a warehouse about 1835 where Mountville Road, by then called Jefferson Road, crossed the Baltimore and Ohio Railroad (9 miles (14 km) southwest of Frederick) to store flour from his Greenfield Mills. The first settler in Adamstown was Robert Palmer, an African American "post and railer" who also ran a general store around 1835. In 1840 when Adam Kohlenburg was appointed the first Baltimore and Ohio railway agent, the community became known as "Adamstown", after his given name. He was also the first postmaster and ran a general store located in the lot between his brick Italianate-style home and the railroad. Edward Hebb laid off lots on the north side of the railroad in the 1840s. Daniel Rhodes of Pennsylvania, the first white settler, was so impressed with the location, he bought a tract of land and laid it off into 12 building lots on the south side of the railroad in 1856.

With Adamstown located close to the Potomac River and Virginia, its citizens were almost exclusively loyal to the South during the Civil War; however, both Federal and Confederate troops were constantly moving on Carrollton Manor. For several months in the spring of 1861, the Minute Men of Adamstown, a secession militia company composed of three officers (Captain Robert H. E. Boteler, 1st Lieutenant Jacob G. Thomas, and 2nd Lieutenant William Hilleary Johnson, all local doctors) planted a pole and flew the Confederate flag adjacent to their guard post next to the B&O railroad. Many skirmishes in the war were fought here and the town was often raided, most notoriously by the 43rd Battalion Virginia Cavalry, also known as Mosby's Rangers, on July 30 and October 14, 1864. On one of these raids, Adam Kohlenburg's entire stock was taken. Local folklore holds that one family had a son fighting for the North and one fighting for the South.

In 1902, Jacob Klein's Addition to Adamstown included the area of Washington, Adams, and Tuscarora streets. The Adamstown Bank was established in 1917, and the building opened in 1919. In 1921, Adamstown had two large grain elevators (Farmers Exchange of Frederick and Thomas & Co.), a blacksmith shop, a carriage works, two garages, a general store, a hardware store, a butcher shop and the bank. Electric lights were first installed in the town in 1921 as well.

In the 1960s, Alcoa built an aluminum production facility, Eastalco Works, to the north of Adamstown which ran until 2005; at its peak, the site covered 400 acres (1.6 km^{2}) and included more than 130 buildings. During its run, the plant produced about 8% of United States aluminum and was among the largest of users of electricity in Maryland. The plant's demise was predicated on a large increase in electricity prices. Several attempts to rebuild or repurpose the site were undertaken until 2011, when structures on the site were razed. By 2025, plans to repurpose the site into a multi-occupant computing data center campus referred to as Quantum Frederick with at least one early resident conducting a facility ground-breaking in December 2024.

== Demographics ==
Historical population
Census	Pop.	Note	%±
2000	2,920		—
2010	2,372		−18.8%
2020	2,331		−1.7%
U.S. Decennial Census

Three new developments with a total of 540 homes have been constructed in Adamstown since 2000 (Green Hill Manor, Saddle Ridge and Adamstown Commons).

=== 2020 census ===
As of the 2020 census, Adamstown had a population of 2,331. The median age was 39.6 years. 28.1% of residents were under the age of 18 and 9.0% of residents were 65 years of age or older. For every 100 females there were 105.6 males, and for every 100 females age 18 and over there were 105.0 males age 18 and over.

100.0% of residents lived in urban areas, while 0.0% lived in rural areas.

There were 710 households in Adamstown, of which 45.5% had children under the age of 18 living in them. Of all households, 79.6% were married-couple households, 7.6% were households with a male householder and no spouse or partner present, and 8.6% were households with a female householder and no spouse or partner present. About 11.2% of all households were made up of individuals and 5.5% had someone living alone who was 65 years of age or older.

There were 717 housing units, of which 1.0% were vacant. The homeowner vacancy rate was 0.0% and the rental vacancy rate was 0.0%.

Racial composition as of the 2020 census
Race	Number	Percent
White	1,759	75.5%
Black or African American	189	8.1%
American Indian and Alaska Native	4	0.2%
Asian	87	3.7%
Native Hawaiian and Other Pacific Islander	1	0.0%
Some other race	46	2.0%
Two or more races	245	10.5%
Hispanic or Latino (of any race)	171	7.3%

Age distribution (2020)
Age group	Number	Percent
Under 5 years	103	4.4%
5 to 9 years	187	8.0%
10 to 14 years	231	9.9%
15 to 19 years	214	9.2%
20 to 24 years	109	4.7%
25 to 29 years	75	3.2%
30 to 34 years	124	5.3%
35 to 39 years	132	5.7%
40 to 44 years	157	6.7%
45 to 49 years	200	8.6%
50 to 54 years	223	9.6%
55 to 59 years	195	8.4%
60 to 64 years	171	7.3%
65 to 69 years	72	3.1%
70 to 74 years	39	1.7%
75 to 79 years	45	1.9%
80 to 84 years	35	1.5%
85 years and over	19	0.8%

=== 2000 census ===
As of the census of 2000, there were 2,920 people, 1,049 households and 829 families residing in Adamstown. The racial makeup of the county was 92.7% White, 4.9% Black or African American, 0.2% Native American, 0.7% Asian, 0.0% Pacific Islander, 0.2% from other races, and 1.3% from two or more races. 1.6% of the population were Hispanic or Latino of any race.

There were 1,049 households, out of which 36.4% had children under the age of 18 living with them, 69.3% were married couples living together, 5.8% had a female householder with no husband present, and 21.0% were non-families. 20.10% of all households were made up of individuals, and 9.1% had someone living alone who was 65 years of age or older. The average household size was 2.77 and the average family size was 3.12.

Adamstown's population was spread out, with 28.8% under the age of 19, 2.9% from 20 to 24, 29.4% from 25 to 44, 24.3% from 45 to 64, and 14.5% who were 65 years of age or older. The median age was 39.5 years. For every 100 females, there were 96.46 males. For every 100 females age 18 and over, there were 97 males.

== Education ==
It is in Frederick County Public Schools.

School zoning is as follows: Carroll Manor Elementary School, Ballenger Creek Middle School, and Tuscarora High School.

Carroll Manor Elementary School services area children from pre-kindergarten through 5th grade. The school also houses part of Frederick County's Challenges Program, a special program for children with autism and other severe communication disorders, which was reported to have instances of abuse. The school also provides special education pre-kindergarten. The school is supported by the Carroll Manor Elementary School PTA.

== Geography ==
Adamstown is located in southern Frederick County 9 miles (14 km) southwest of Frederick, the county seat, and 5 miles (8 km) northeast of the Potomac River at Point of Rocks.

=== Highways ===
- Maryland Route 85
