= Buckeystown, Maryland =

- Census-designated place
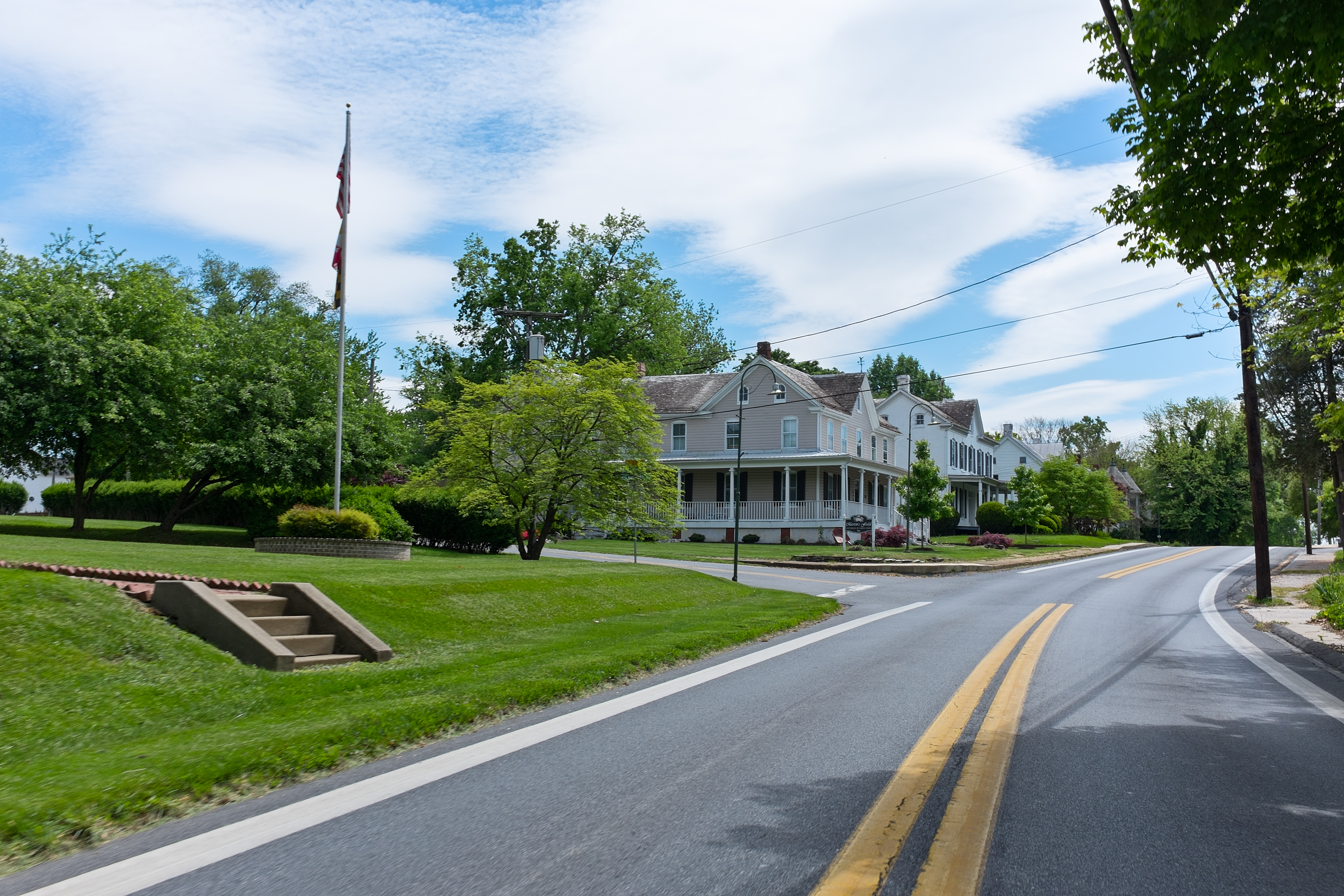
- Buckeystown

- Location in Maryland Buckeystown (the United States)
- Coordinates: 39°19′35″N 77°25′40″W
- Country: United States
- State: Maryland
- County: Frederick

Area
  - Total: 0.92 sq mi (2.37 km^{2})
  - Land: 0.91 sq mi (2.36 km^{2})
  - Water: 0 sq mi (0.00 km^{2})
- Elevation: 269 ft (82 m)

Population (2020)
  - Total: 1,072
  - Density: 1,174.0/sq mi (453.29/km^{2})
- Time zone: UTC−5 (Eastern (EST))
  - Summer (DST): UTC−4 (EDT)
- ZIP code: 21717
- Area codes: 301, 240
- FIPS code: 24-11050
- GNIS feature ID: 2583592

Buckeystown is an unincorporated community and census-designated place (CDP) in Frederick County, Maryland, United States. As of the 2010 census the population was 1,019. Buckeystown Historic District and Buckingham House and Industrial School Complex were listed on the National Register of Historic Places in 1982. Carrollton Manor was listed in 1997. Former Congressman Roscoe Bartlett lives on a farm in the town.

== History ==
In 1731, Meridith Davis received a patent for a tract of land called “Good Luck” on which the future village of Buckeystown developed. The fertile, mostly flat land and Monocacy River were enticing to European immigrants and settlers moving west into the newly opened Monocacy Hundred territory. The river is a major tributary of the Potomac River that plays a significant role in the local Piedmont plateau ecosystem. Among these earliest settlers in the region were Henry Ballenger and Josiah Ballenger Sr., Quakers who moved into the Province of Maryland from the Colony of New Jersey. Members of the Ballenger family as well as the Davis Family who were also Quakers organized a Society of Friends at “Monoquesey” [Monocacy] and Meridith Davis donated land from his “Good Luck” tract on which to build a meetinghouse in 1739. Though the meeting at Monocacy was short-lived, with many of its early members moving into the Colony of Virginia to join larger Quaker communities there, the Society of Friends near Buckeystown was among the first religious organizations effected within present-day Frederick County and western Maryland. During the Revolutionary War period, brothers John and George Buckey settled on the old “Good Luck” tract and initiated commercial and industrial establishments which led to the formation of the village. Much of the town's growth in the 19th century was supported by the Baker family who purchased the Buckey tannery in 1832 and later founded the town's cannery, Methodist Church, and an industrial school for boys.

== Geography ==
Buckeystown is located in southern Frederick County along Maryland Route 85, which leads north 6 miles (10 km) to Frederick, the county seat, and south 5.5 miles (8.9 km) to Maryland Route 28 near the Potomac River. The CDP extends east as far as the Monocacy River. Maryland Route 80 leads east from Buckeystown 5.5 miles (8.9 km) to Urbana.

According to the U.S. Census Bureau, the Buckeystown CDP has a total area of 1.5 square miles (4.0 km^{2}), of which 0.01 square miles (0.02 km^{2}), or 0.55%, is water.

== Demographics ==
Historical population
Census	Pop.	Note	%±
2010	1,019		—
2020	1,072		5.2%
U.S. Decennial Census

== Churches ==
Two United Methodist churches, a Roman Catholic parish (St. Joseph's), and an Anglican church (St. Michael the Archangel Anglican Catholic Church) are located in Buckeystown.

== Education ==
It is in Frederick County Public Schools.

School zoning is as follows: Carroll Manor Elementary School, Ballenger Creek Middle School, and Tuscarora High School.
