= Daniel S. Biser =

American politician (1801–1877)

Speaker of the Maryland House of Delegates
- In office 1841
- Preceded by: Charles Sterrett Ridgely
- Succeeded by: John Carroll LeGrand
- In office 1842
- Preceded by: John Carroll LeGrand
- Succeeded by: William H. Watson

Member of the Maryland House of Delegates
- In office 1837–1839
- In office 1841–1842
- In office 1844–1845
- In office 1849

Personal details
- Born: 1801
- Died: February 27, 1877 (aged 75–76) Burkittsville, Maryland, U.S.
- Resting place: Burkittsville Union Cemetery; Burkittsville, Maryland, U.S.
- Party: Democratic

Daniel S. Biser (1801 – February 27, 1877) was an American politician. He served as member of the Maryland House of Delegates from 1837 to 1839, 1841 to 1842, 1844 to 1845 and in 1849. Biser served as Speaker of the Maryland House of Delegates in 1841 and 1842.

== Early life ==
Daniel S. Biser was born in 1801.

== Career ==
Biser was a Democrat. He served in the Maryland House of Delegates, representing Frederick County, Maryland, from 1837 to 1839, 1841 to 1842, 1844 to 1845 and in 1849. He was the delegate from Maryland's 2nd Congressional district to the 1844 Democratic National Convention in Baltimore. In 1845, he resigned before the conclusion of his term. After his resignation, he was appointed to the Baltimore Custom House. He served as Speaker of the Maryland House of Delegates in 1841 and 1842 with John Carroll LeGrand serving between his two terms.

Biser was appointed as assistant flour inspector by Governor Lowe. In 1853, Biser was appointed as flour inspector general in Baltimore by Governor Ligon. Biser was elected to a six-year term as clerk of the Circuit Court in Frederick County in 1865, but only served until 1867. In 1867, Biser was appointed by Judge Nelson to replace J. W. L. Carty who died in office as clerk of the Circuit Court.

Biser served as a member of the Chesapeake and Ohio Canal board.

== Personal life ==
Biser married and his wife died in 1876. In 1845, Biser lost a son after a tree fell on him. In 1864, Biser lost another son B. F. Biser, a captain in the 7th Illinois Infantry Regiment at the Battle of Old River Lake.

Biser died on February 27, 1877, at his home in Burkittsville, Maryland. He was buried at the Burkittsville Union Cemetery.
