= List of cemeteries in Maryland =

This list of cemeteries in Maryland includes currently operating, historical (closed for new interments), and defunct (graves abandoned or removed) cemeteries, columbaria, and mausolea which are historical and/or notable. It does not include pet cemeteries.

== Anne Arundel County ==
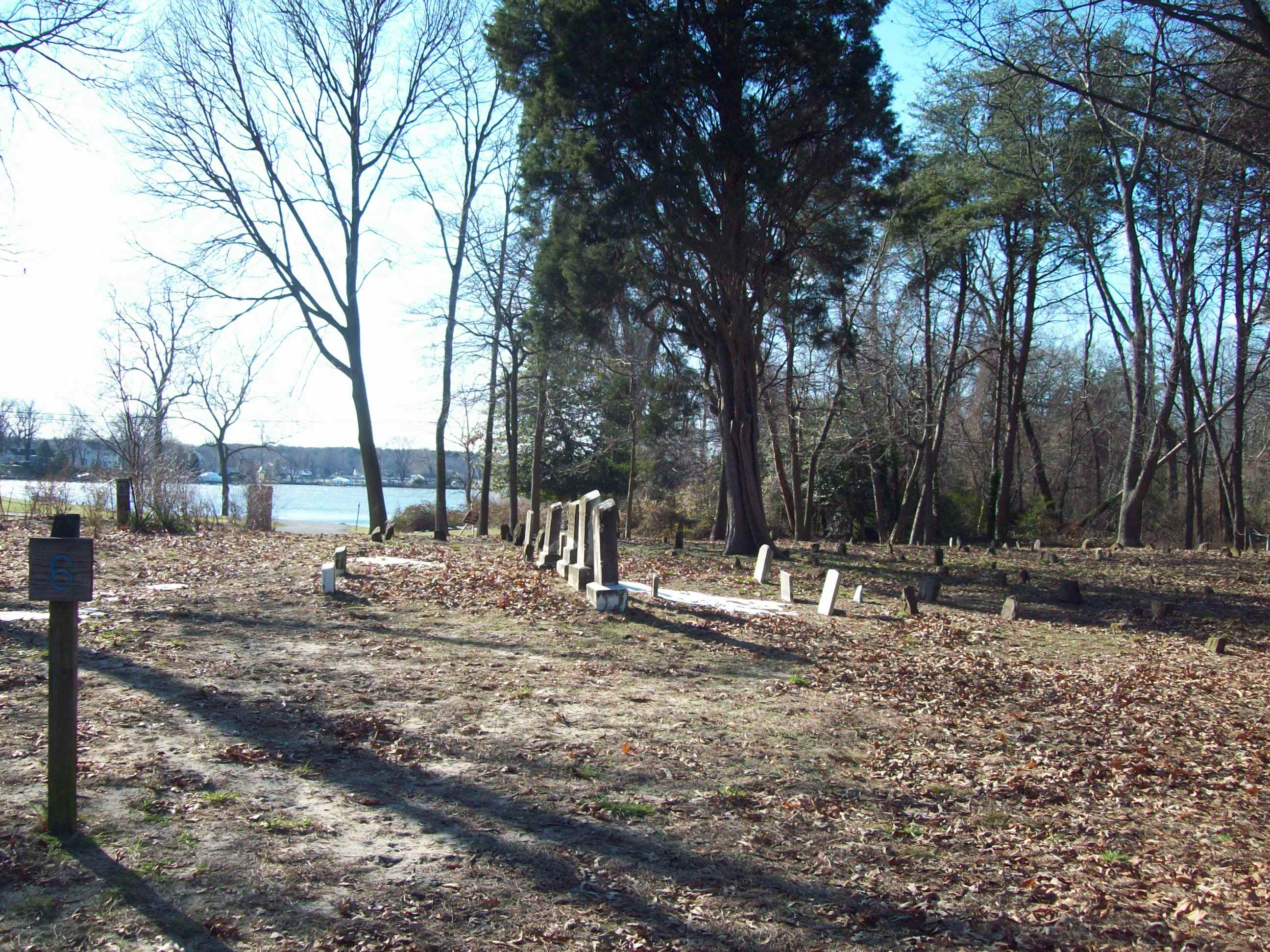
Hancock's Resolution Cemetery in Pasadena, Anne Arundel County

- Annapolis National Cemetery, Annapolis; NRHP-listed
- Hancock's Resolution Cemetery, Pasadena; NRHP-listed
- United States Naval Academy Cemetery, Annapolis
- Watkins Slave Cemetery, Davidsonville

== Baltimore County ==
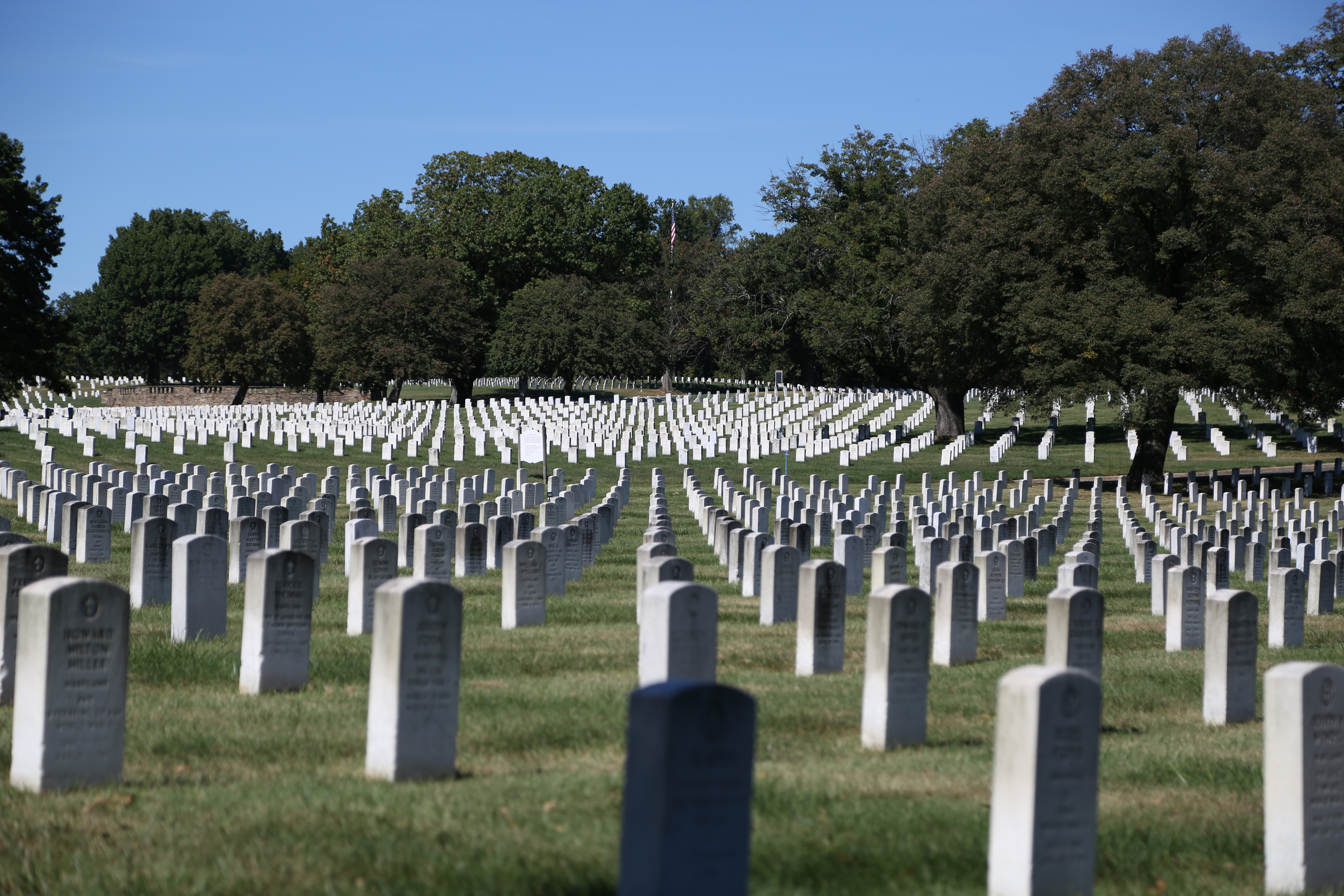
Baltimore National Cemetery in Baltimore, Baltimore County

- Baltimore National Cemetery, Baltimore
- Bohemian National Cemetery, Baltimore
- Druid Ridge Cemetery, Pikesville
- Dulaney Valley Memorial Gardens, Timonium
- Friends Burial Ground, Baltimore
- Green Mount Cemetery, Baltimore
- Laurel Cemetery, Baltimore
- Lorraine Park Cemetery, Baltimore
- Loudon Park Cemetery, Baltimore
- Loudon Park National Cemetery, Baltimore
- Mount Auburn Cemetery, Baltimore
- Mount Olivet Cemetery, Baltimore
- New Cathedral Cemetery, Baltimore
- Old Saint Paul's Cemetery, Baltimore
- Weiskittel-Roehle Burial Vault, Baltimore
- Westminster Hall and Burying Ground, Baltimore

== Caroline County ==
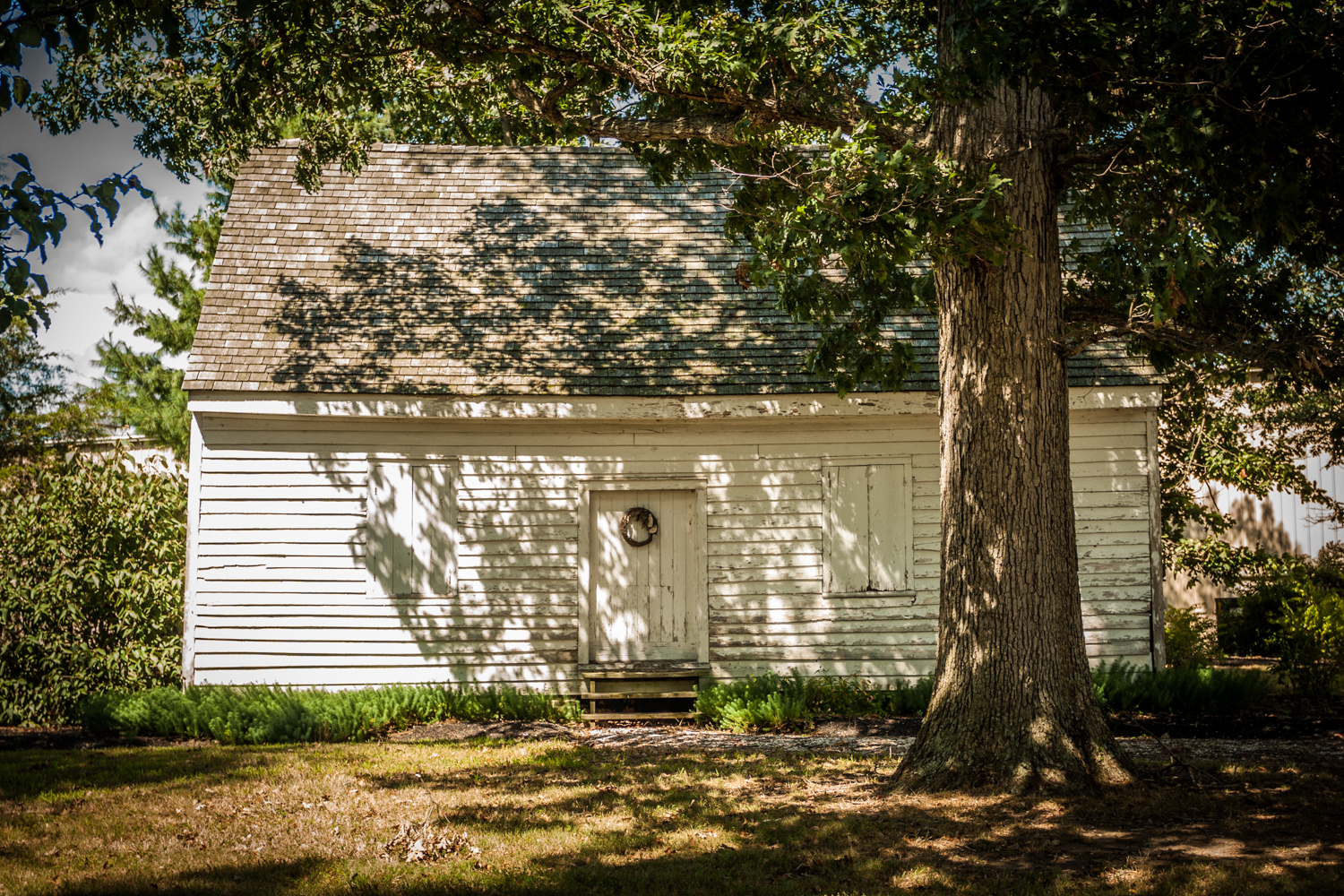
Neck Meetinghouse and Yard in West Denton, Caroline County

- Neck Meetinghouse and Yard (or Quaker Meetinghouse and Graveyard), West Denton; NRHP-listed

== Cecil County ==
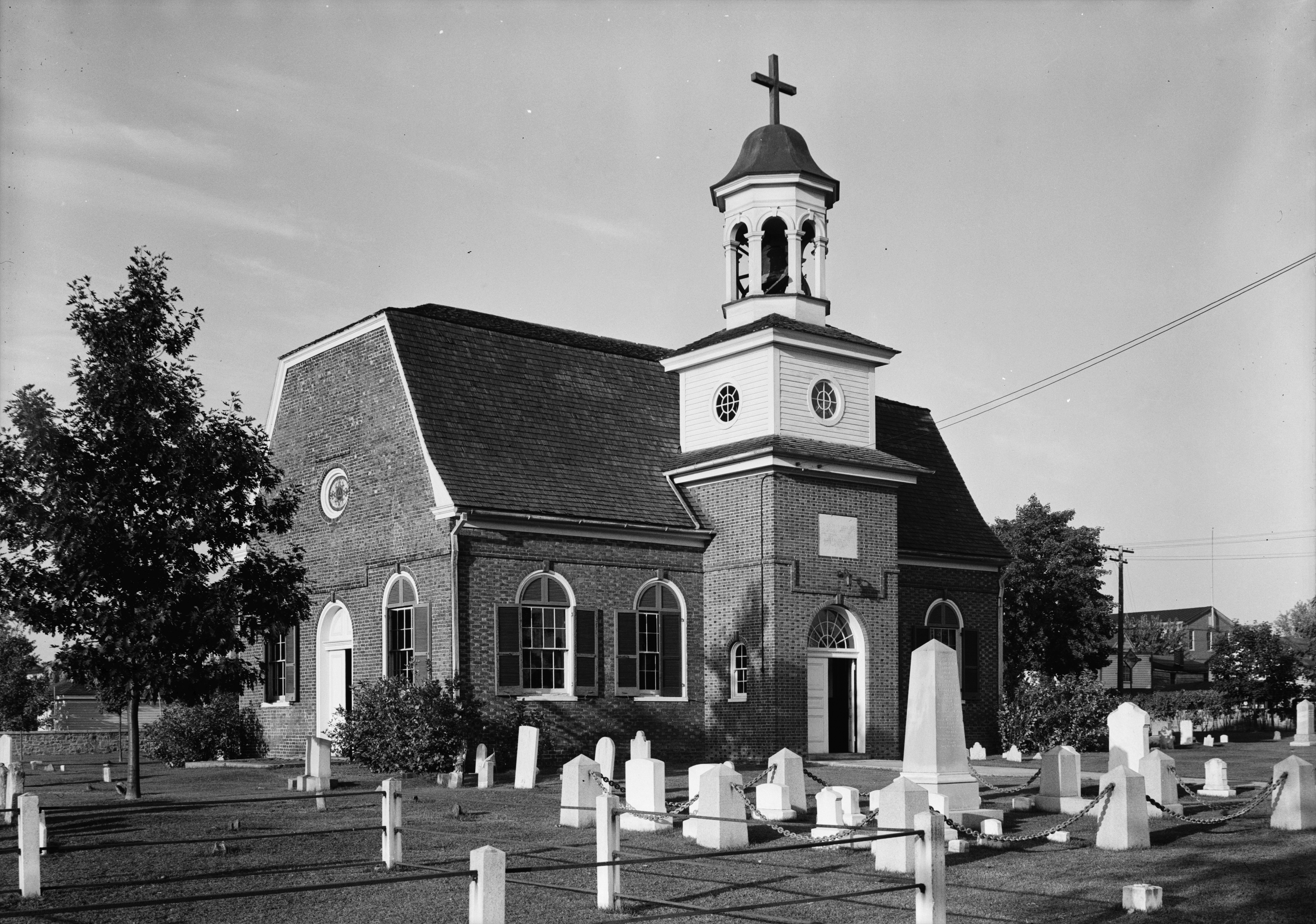
St. Mary Anne's Episcopal Church and Cemetery in North East, Cecil County

- St. Mary Anne's Episcopal Church and Cemetery (or North Elk Parish), North East

== Dorchester County ==
- Galestown Cemetery, Galestown

== Frederick County ==
- Laboring Sons Memorial Grounds, Frederick
- Mount Olivet Cemetery, Frederick
- St. John's Cemetery, Frederick

== Harford County ==
- Angel Hill Cemetery, Havre de Grace

== Howard County ==
- Rosa Bonheur Memorial Park, Elkridge; named for Rosa Bonheur (1822–1899)
- Grace Episcopal Church, Elkridge MD
- Melville Methodist Church, Elkridge MD

== Montgomery County ==
- Gate of Heaven Cemetery, Silver Spring
- Parklawn Memorial Park & Menorah Gardens at the former Wilkins Estate, Rockville
- Rockville Cemetery, Rockville
- Monacacy Cemetery, Beallsville

== Prince George's County ==
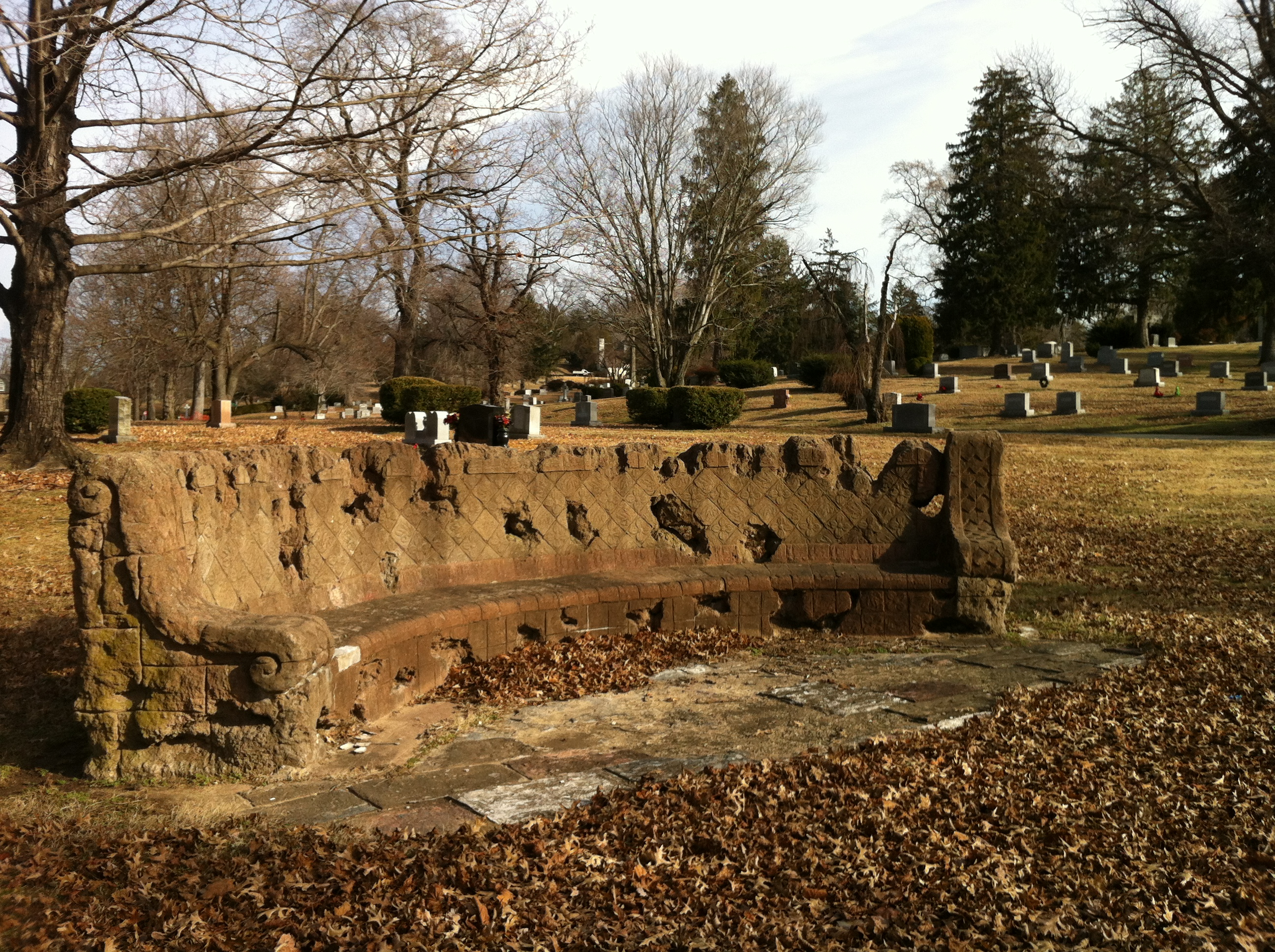
Tiled stone bench at Cedar Hill Cemetery in Suitland, Prince George's County

- Cedar Hill Cemetery (or Forest Lake Cemetery, formerly Nonesuch Plantation Cemetery), Suitland
- Ivy Hill Cemetery, Laurel
- Lincoln Memorial Cemetery, Suitland
- National Harmony Memorial Park, Landover

== Talbot County ==
- Spring Hill Cemetery, Easton

== Washington County ==
- Antietam National Cemetery at Antietam National Battlefield, Sharpsburg; NRHP-listed
- Rose Hill Cemetery, Hagerstown
- Washington Confederate Cemetery, Hagerstown

== See also ==
- List of cemeteries in the United States
- National Register of Historic Places listings in Maryland
- Aspin Hill Memorial Park, pet cemetery in Aspen Hill, Maryland
