= Irwin F. Hoffman =

American politician (1927–2023)

Member of the Maryland House of Delegates from the 2B district
- In office 1963–1982
- Preceded by: District established
- Succeeded by: Peter G. Callas

Personal details
- Born: Irwin Frederick Hoffman Jr. January 10, 1927 Cumberland, Maryland, U.S.
- Died: January 7, 2023 (aged 95) Chambersburg, Pennsylvania, U.S.
- Resting place: Rose Hill Cemetery; Hagerstown, Maryland, U.S.
- Party: Democratic
- Spouse: Edith Jeanetta Hoffman (m. 1951; died 2008)
- Children: 4
- Occupation: Politician; insurance agent

Irwin Frederick Hoffman Jr. (January 10, 1927 – January 7, 2023) was an American politician and insurance agent from Maryland. He served in the Maryland House of Delegates from 1963 to 1982.

== Early life ==
Irwin Frederick Hoffman Jr. was born on January 10, 1927, in Cumberland, Maryland, to Mary (née Maisack) and Irwin Frederick Hoffman. He attended public schools in Hagerstown. He graduated from Hagerstown High School in 1945. He was active in football, basketball, and baseball. He was captain of the football team his senior year.

== Career ==
Hoffman was a Democrat. He served as a member of the Maryland House of Delegates, representing district 2B and part of Washington County, from 1963 to 1982. He was vice chair of the environmental masters committee from 1969 to 1982 and the natural resources committee in 1968. He was chair of the Washington County delegation from 1975 to 1982 and of the Western Maryland delegation from 1980 to 1982.

Hoffman served in the United States Navy during World War II. He worked as a general insurance agent for the family's Irwin F. Hoffman Insurance Agency in Hagerstown. He worked as an insurance agent in Erie, Pennsylvania, for 29 years, retiring in 1988.

Hoffman played semi-professional football for the Hagerstown Marketeers for six years. He became exalted ruler of Lodge 378 of the Benevolent and Protective Order of Elks in April 1956. He coached the Elks junior league basketball team in Hagerstown.

== Personal life ==
Hoffman married Edith Jeanetta Hoffman, daughter of Marybelle Hoffman, on December 30, 1951. They had four daughters, Candace, Kathryn Lynn, Ann Elizabeth and Lisa. His wife died in 2008. He lived on Potomac Street in Hagerstown. He was a Lutheran and a member of St. John's Lutheran Church in Hagerstown. His nickname was Irv.

Hoffman died on January 7, 2023, at his home in Chambersburg, Pennsylvania. He was buried in Rose Hill Cemetery in Hagerstown.
