= Watkins Slave Cemetery =

Historic cemetery in Maryland, U.S.

- Interactive map of Watkins Slave Cemetery

Details
- Established: about 1848
- Location: Anne Arundel County, Maryland
- Coordinates: 38°57′25.9″N 76°38′55.4″W
- Find a Grave: Watkins Slave Cemetery

Watkins Slave Cemetery is located in Davidsonville, Maryland, in Anne Arundel County, on Maryland 424 (Davidsonville Road), 0.4 miles (0.64 km) south of US 50/301.

In 1960, road construction revealed the remains of anonymous slaves. They were reburied at Mt. Tabor Church, 1421 St. Stephens Church Road, in Crownsville, Maryland. There is a historical marker, which says the slaves were associated with the Locust Grove Plantation.

== See also ==
- List of cemeteries in Maryland
