= Laboring Sons Memorial Grounds =

Historic African American cemetery in Maryland, U.S.

- Interactive map of Laboring Sons Memorial Grounds

Details
- Established: 1851
- Closed: 1949
- Location: Frederick, Maryland
- Country: United States
- Coordinates: 39°25′14″N 77°24′25″W
- Owned by: City of Frederick
- Size: 1.17 acres (0.47 ha)
- No. of interments: ≈ 1,500
- Find a Grave: Laboring Sons Memorial Grounds

The Laboring Sons Memorial Grounds is a memorial ground in Frederick, Maryland located between 5th and 6th Street on Chapel Alley. The cemetery was established by the Laboring Sons Beneficial Society in 1851 as a cemetery for free blacks in the city. In 1949 the cemetery would be given to the City of Frederick who destroyed the grounds and created a whites-only park. In 1999 the original nature of the grounds was rediscovered. In 2000, the City of Frederick promised to make amends for what happened with the grounds. In 2001 the site was dedicated as the Laboring Sons Memorial Grounds. Construction on the new memorial grounds finished in 2003.

== Physical description ==
The memorial grounds are 1.17 acres (0.47 ha) in size and are located between 5th and 6th Street on Chapel Alley; they take up most of the block. The park is surrounded by sidewalks on 3 sides. The entrance, located on the side bordering 6th Street, has a metal archway. The sidewalks bisect sidewalks and lead towards a hill in the center on which there stands a monument to those who are buried on the grounds. The monument lists of the names of the identifiable dead buried on the grounds, along with a brief history of the grounds, and a note commemorating the Laboring Sons Memorial Committee and the City of Frederick for their work to restore the grounds.

== History ==
=== Establishment and decline ===
The Laboring Sons Beneficial Society was founded in 1837 "for the purpose of relieving or alleviating both spiritually and temporally any member of us who may be distressed and to see that his mortal remains be interred with decency." It would not see official incorporation though until 1867, when the Maryland General Assembly passed an act incorporating it. Its membership consisted of both free and enslaved blacks from Frederick; free blacks at the time numbered around 790 or about 16% of the city's population. They established the cemetery, purchasing 1.17 acres of land for $265, located between 5th and 6th Street on Chapel Alley, in the Historic District of Frederick, in 1851. At the time there were few cemeteries in which blacks could be buried in the city, and even in those the amount of available space was limited. In 1852, a quarter of the cemetery was divided in 12 foot by 16 foot plots with white marble corner posts. As time went on the remainder of the grounds were sold off as burial plots in order to fund the society's activities.

In 1862 half of the Laboring Sons Beneficial Society split off into the Workingmen's Society due to disagreements within the group.

By 1949 the cemetery had an estimated 1,500 bodies buried in it, but there was nobody left to care for the grounds, and they had deteriorated. A photo in a 1948 newspaper showed the cemetery covered in weeds and underbrush. Garland Makel Jr., grandson of one of the last of the society's officials, said, "There was nobody left to take care of it any more, everybody with any connection to the place had died or moved away." After a special meeting of the lot holders in Laboring Sons that took place on 1 October 1948, they gave the grounds to the City of Frederick, who in turn, promised to restore the grounds to their original condition. The agreement proposed to the city, which the city accepted, was: that the city would maintain the land as a public park and playground with the name Laboring Sons Memorial Park, that no further burials would be permitted unless the city decided to allow a black hero, scientist, artist, or athlete to be buried, that a monument be erected, that the park would be open to colored residents of the city, all the monuments and stones currently in the cemetery would be left undisturbed, and that the city would fund a study regarding juvenile delinquency amongst the colored youth and propose solutions to fix it. The memorial tablet that the city had promised to erect was never erected.

Instead of restoring the grounds, in 1949 the city removed the remaining grave stones and headstones from the cemetery. Newspapers at the time reported that some of the remains in the cemetery were disturbed. The workmen buried some of the headstones to provide a smooth surface for laying black-top. The city then covered the grounds in black-top, added recreational equipment (such as swings and a basketball court) and converted the grounds into a whites-only park which they named Chapel Park. During the construction, a list of the names of those interred at the site began to be compiled, but was stopped after reaching only 161 names.

Municipal workers who helped move the grave stones underground said that they had just done as they were told and that no bodies had been moved. Makel also said that no bodies were removed from the site, but an official from Fairview Cemetery has said that some of the bodies were moved to Fairview Cemetery. Lord Nickens, a civil rights activist in Frederick, also claims that some of the bodies were removed and moved to Fairview Cemetery. The city has no record of any objections at the time to what was done to the cemetery. William O. Lee Jr. speculated that most people who had living descendants probably had their remains moved to Fairview Cemetery and that those who remained had nobody to object for them. For some time after this the original use of the grounds was forgotten.

=== Rediscovery ===
In the 1990s, a Frederick resident, Jackie Berry, decided to research her great-great-uncle's burial location. His death certificate stated he was buried in Laboring Sons Cemetery. She made the connection that Laboring Sons Park might be the location of Laboring Sons Cemetery. Around the same time former alderman Bill Lee and Bernard Brown, Grand Master of a Improved Benevolent and Protective Order of Elks of the World lodge, were urging the city to acknowledge what had happened and make amends.

In 1999, the City of Frederick decided to rename all of the alleys in the city, with a particular emphasis on naming them after historical prominent black citizens. The Gazette heard about the grounds because a local resident, living near Chapel Park, suggested that Chapel Alley ought to be named Laboring Sons Alley in recognition of Laboring Sons Beneficial Society and in memory of those buried under the park. The article, run in the Gazette in 2000, helped bolster support for restoring the grounds. A newspaper reporter noticed that, on an old map in city hall, the grounds were labeled "Colored Cemetery" dispelling the idea that the city may have destroyed the grounds out of ignorance of their purpose.

In January 2000, the board of alderman unanimously promised to make amends and honor those buried on the grounds with a plaque. In February 2000, a retired engineer, who remembered when the incident happened, and had worked on the grounds, and helped record the names of those interred there, showed city officials a map of the cemetery along with a partial list of names of those interred, allowing them to discover the location of the graves within the site. These documents put an end to speculation about whether or not there were any dead buried under the site. After the names were found the plans for the plaque were changed from a plaque simply describing the history of the grounds to a plaque that would also list the names of those buried there.

A committee was formed in June 2000 to research the site and plan a memorial. An archaeologist company in Frederick volunteered to do a remote sensing on the grounds for free and found 10 possible burial shafts in two areas of the park. The committee suggested to the city that it remove all recreational equipment from the site, remove the asphalt, erect a monument with the names, birth dates, and death dates of those interred, along with a description of the site, create paths and benches on the sites that were not over identified graves, build another play area in the community, and rededicate the location as Laboring Sons Memorial Park.

=== Restoration ===
Work on the memorial was fraught with "delay and inaction" for two and a half years after the committee issued its suggestions. Roelky Myers, director of parks and recreation for Frederick in 2003, said that the committee the city set up for the memorial were unaware that they would have to go through the Historic District Commission, leading to delays. In the week leading up to 13 September 2002 the Frederick Historic District Commission approved the basic design of the memorial park along with the design of the 4 foot tall and 11 foot wide granite monument to be erected there. The city's director of historic preservation, Barbara Wyatt, volunteered to design a memorial park to put on the site, and to champion the effort. William O. Lee Jr., a member of the committee formed in 2000, said, "Without her we wouldn't be this far". The design for the park evolved from a simple design with some benches and paths to a much more elaborate setup with trees, bisecting pathways, and retaining walls that are short enough to sit on. City officials promised to rename it Laboring Sons.

The city earmarked $40,000 of federal grant money for restoration of the park. Another $60,000 was acquired from a combination of donations and the city's capital improvement program.

Jennifer Dougherty, who was elected mayor of Frederick in 2002, promised during her campaign that she would restore the grounds, saying that, "It seems logical to say a burial ground should never become something other than a burial ground, or at least a place of honor." When she was elected Mayor she approved work to identify those who were buried in the grounds and made work on the grounds one of her priorities.

Construction of the memorial park was hindered by the discovery of bodies and having to bring in "copious amounts of dirt" in order to cover them. The dirt was used so that any construction would happen on the new top layer of soil and the bodies interred would remain undisturbed. As work was done on the site the State's Attorney was notified anytime that a new body was found.

In 2001 the site was dedicated as a memorial garden and the name changed to Laboring Sons Memorial Ground; in 2003, on Martin Luther King Jr. Day, the site was rededicated as a memorial ground and a plaque was erected listing the names of the 117 people known to be buried there. A second re-dedication ceremony was done on 20 June 2003 when construction on the site had finished

== See also ==
- List of cemeteries in Maryland
