= Annapolis National Cemetery =

Historic veterans cemetery in Anne Arundel County, Maryland

- U.S. National Register of Historic Places
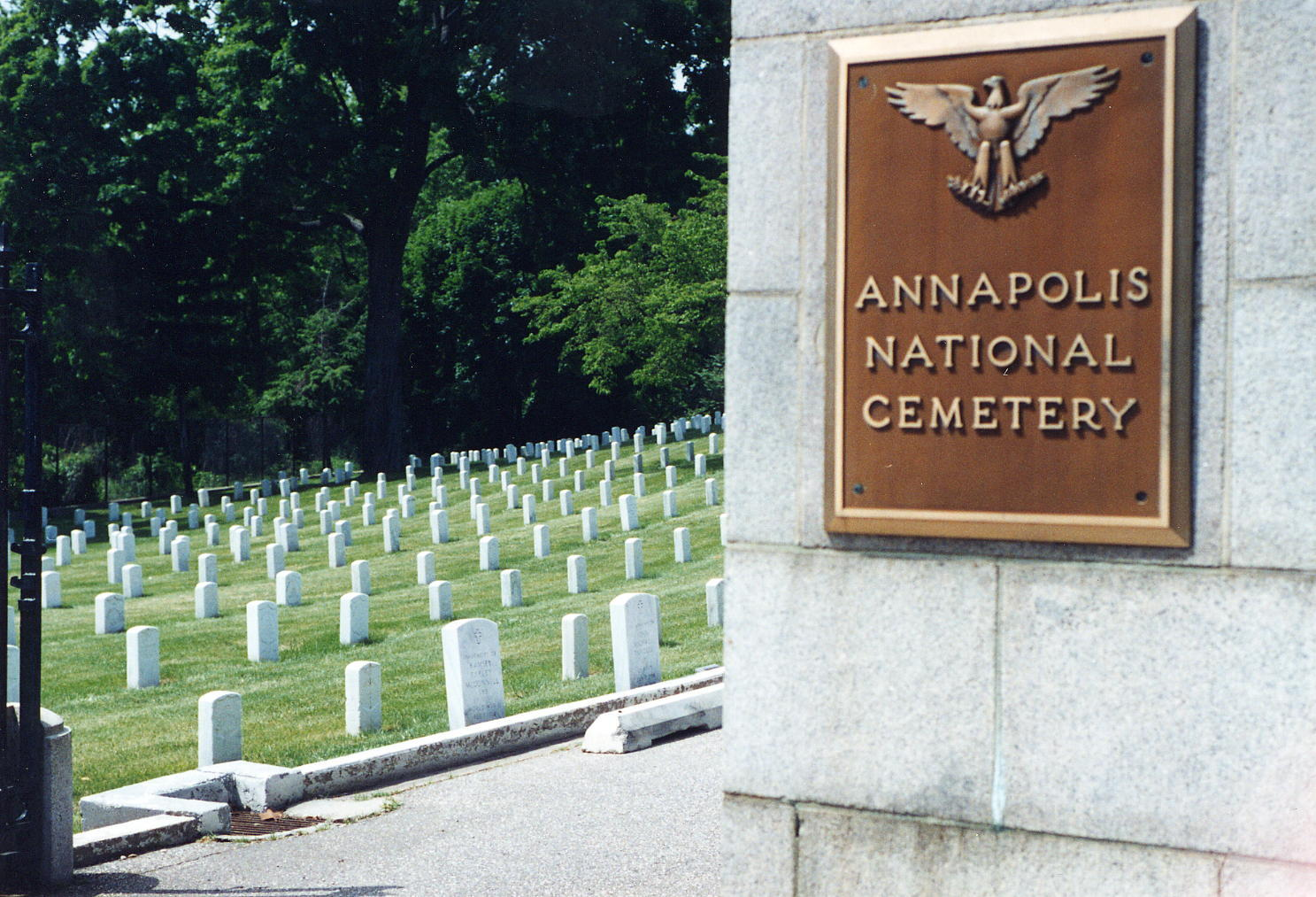
- Annapolis National Cemetery view

- Location within Maryland Location within the United States
- Location: 800 West St., Annapolis, Maryland
- Coordinates: 38°58′38″N 76°30′19″W
- Architectural style: Colonial Revival
- MPS: Civil War Era National Cemeteries MPS
- NRHP reference No.: 96000608
- Added to NRHP: June 13, 1996

Annapolis National Cemetery is a United States National Cemetery located in the city of Annapolis, in Anne Arundel County, Maryland. It encompasses 4.1 acres (1.7 ha), and as of 2020, had over 3,100 interments. It is operated and maintained by the Baltimore National Cemetery.

== History ==
Annapolis National Cemetery is one of the 14 national cemeteries established by Abraham Lincoln in 1862 to accommodate the dead from the American Civil War. The original plot of land was leased, and later purchased, from Judge Nicholas Brewer.

During the Civil War, Annapolis was a Union recruit training center. There was also a parole camp nearby (approximately three miles from what was then the city line) where Union prisoners who had been exchanged for Confederate prisoners were held until they could be returned to their own units. The conditions in the camp were crowded and were not particularly sanitary; many soldiers wound up in one of the army field hospitals at the U.S. Naval Academy and at St. John's College in downtown Annapolis. A large number succumbed to wounds they bore when they arrived, small pox, typhoid fever, dysentery or any of a number of other diseases. Most of the original interments were men who died in the parole camp or the field hospitals. Several Confederate prisoners, and one Russian national, also died in Annapolis and are buried in the cemetery.

Many soldiers, sailors, Marines and airmen who served during, or died in, subsequent wars – as well as some of their dependents – are also interred there.

Annapolis National Cemetery was placed on the National Register of Historic Places in 1996.

== See also ==
- United States Department of Veterans Affairs
- National Register of Historic Places listings in Anne Arundel County, Maryland
- List of cemeteries in Maryland
