= James Dixon Roman =

American politician (1809–1867)

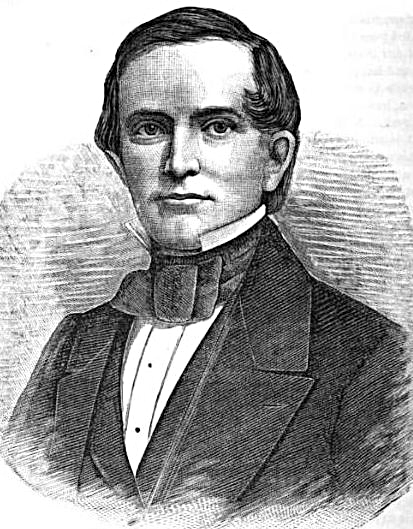

Member of the U.S. House of Representatives from Maryland's 2nd district
- In office March 4, 1847 – March 3, 1849
- Preceded by: Thomas Johns Perry
- Succeeded by: William Thomas Hamilton

Personal details
- Born: August 11, 1809 Chester County, Pennsylvania, U.S.
- Died: January 19, 1867 (aged 57) Hagerstown, Maryland, U.S.
- Resting place: Rose Hill Cemetery
- Occupation: Lawyer, politician

James Dixon Roman (August 11, 1809 – January 19, 1867) was an American politician.

== Early life ==
Born in Chester County, Pennsylvania, Roman attended the common schools and a private school at West Nottingham (now Nottingham, Pennsylvania). He later moved to Cecil County, Maryland, and began to study law in Frederick. He was admitted to the bar in 1834 and commenced practice in Hagerstown.

== Career ==
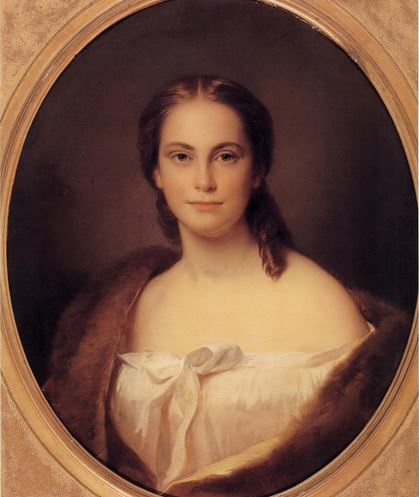
His daughter, Sarah Roman Baldwin

Roman served as a member of the Maryland State Senate in 1847 and was elected as a Whig to the Thirtieth Congress, serving from March 4, 1847, to March 3, 1849. He was presidential elector on the Whig ticket in 1848 and on the Democratic ticket in 1856.

He again resumed the practice of law in Hagerstown, and served as president of the Old Hagerstown Bank from 1851 until his death. He was also a member of the peace convention held in Washington, D.C., in 1861 in an effort to devise means to prevent the impending war.

== Personal life ==
Roman was married to Louisa Margaret Kennedy (1809–1878), the daughter of John Kennedy and Margaret (née Wagner) Kennedy. Together, they were the parents of:

- Louisa Kennedy Roman, who died young.
- Sarah "Sallie" Roman (1843–1873), who married Christopher Columbus Baldwin, the Naval Officer of the Port of New York.
- James Dixon Roman (1854–1875), who died unmarried shortly after finishing his junior year at Harvard University.

Roman died on January 19, 1867, near Hagerstown, Maryland, and is interred in Rose Hill Cemetery.

U.S. House of Representatives
Preceded by Thomas Johns Perry	Member of the U.S. House of Representatives from Maryland's 2nd congressional district 1847–1849	Succeeded by William Thomas Hamilton
