= Thomas J. Perry =

American politician

Thomas Johns Perry
- Born: February 17, 1807; Cumberland, Maryland, U.S.
- Died: June 27, 1871 (aged 64); Cumberland, Maryland, U.S.
- Occupations: Attorney, Politician
- Office: Member of the U.S. House of Representatives
- Predecessor: Francis Brengle
- Successor: James Dixon Roman
- Political party: Democratic

Thomas Johns Perry (February 17, 1807 – June 27, 1871) was an American politician.

Born in Cumberland, Maryland, Perry completed preparatory studies and also studied law. He was admitted to the bar in 1828 and commenced practice in Cumberland soon thereafter. A Democrat, Brengle sat in the Maryland House of Delegates from 1834 to 1836, and was elected to the Twenty-ninth United States Congress on October 1, 1845, serving from December 1, 1845, to March 3, 1847. He was not a candidate for reelection in 1846.

After Congress, Perry served as associate judge of the sixth judicial district of Maryland from 1851 to 1861 and again from 1864 to 1871. He was also a delegate to the State constitutional convention in 1867. He died in Cumberland at the age of 64, and is interred in Rose Hill Cemetery.

U.S. House of Representatives
| Preceded by Francis Brengle | Member of the U.S. House of Representatives from Maryland's 2nd congressional district 1845–1847 | Succeeded by James Dixon Roman |
