= Francis Brengle =

American politician (1807–1846)

Member of the U.S. House of Representatives from Maryland's 2nd district
- In office March 4, 1843 – March 3, 1845
- Preceded by: James Alfred Pearce
- Succeeded by: Thomas Johns Perry

Member of the Maryland House of Delegates from the Frederick County district
- In office 1836–1836 Serving with George Bowlus, Joshua Doub, Jacob Matthias
- Preceded by: Robert Annan, Daniel Duvall, Isaac Shriver, William Willis
- Succeeded by: Daniel S. Biser, Ezra Cramer, George W. Ent, John W. Geyer
- In office 1834–1834 Serving with Robert Annan, Daniel Duvall, William Roberts
- Preceded by: Joseph M. Palmer, David Schley, John Sifford, Abdiel Unkefer
- Succeeded by: Robert Annan, Daniel Duvall, Isaac Shriver, William Willis

Personal details
- Born: November 26, 1807 Frederick, Maryland, U.S.
- Died: December 10, 1846 (aged 39) Frederick, Maryland, U.S.
- Resting place: Mount Olivet Cemetery
- Party: Whig
- Occupation: Politician; lawyer

Francis Brengle (November 26, 1807 – December 10, 1846) was an American politician from Maryland.

== Early life ==
Francis Brengle was born on November 26, 1807, in Frederick, Maryland. He studied law and was admitted to the bar.

== Career ==
Brengle commenced practicing law in Frederick. He served as a member of the Maryland House of Delegates in 1834 and 1836. He was elected as a Whig to the Twenty-eighth Congress for Maryland's 2nd congressional district (then comprising Allegany, Frederick and Washington Counties) on February 14, 1844, defeating former Democratic Representative John Thomson Mason, Jr. He served a brief term, taking his seat on February 22, 1844, and losing it to Democrat Thomas Johns Perry on October 1, 1845.

== Personal life ==
Brengle died in Frederick on December 10, 1846. He was interred in Mount Olivet Cemetery.

U.S. House of Representatives
Preceded by James Alfred Pearce	Member of the U.S. House of Representatives from Maryland's 2nd congressional district 1844–1845	Succeeded by Thomas Johns Perry
