= Rose Hill Cemetery (Maryland) =

Cemetery in Washington County, Maryland

Coordinates: 39°37′44″N 77°43′19″W

- Interactive map of Rose Hill Cemetery

Details
- Established: 1865
- Location: Hagerstown, Maryland
- Size: 102 acres (41 ha)
- No. of graves: Over 43,000

Rose Hill Cemetery, located in Hagerstown, Maryland, is the oldest public cemetery in Washington County Maryland. The cemetery features over 102 acres of burial space and is the final resting place of over 43,000 individuals.

The cemetery was established on land originally granted to the Wroe family by King George III in the 1700s. Dr. John A. Wroe and his wife purchased the land. Their home was on a hill called Wroe's Hill. In 1865, William T. Hamilton and a group of individuals established the Hagerstown Cemetery Association and in 1866 purchased land needed to establish the area's first public cemetery and chartered the cemetery as Rose Hill Cemetery of Hagerstown.

== Cemetery within the cemetery ==
The Washington Confederate Cemetery was bought by the state of Maryland in 1871. The cemetery has 2,467 Confederate soldiers from the Battle of Antietam. Only 346 soldiers graves were identified.

== Notable interments ==
- Alexander Armstrong (1877–1939), Attorney General of Maryland and Republican candidate for governor
- George Bell (brigadier general)
- George Freaner (1831–1878), member of the Maryland House of Delegates
- William Thomas Hamilton
- Irwin F. Hoffman (1927–2023), member of the Maryland House of Delegates
- William Preston Lane Jr.
- John Thomson Mason Jr.
- Hiram Percy Maxim
- Louis Emory McComas
- James Dixon Roman
- Robert Lawson Rose
- Andrew K. Syester (1828–1891), state delegate and Attorney General of Maryland
- William O. Wilson
