= Hancock's Resolution =

Historic house in Maryland, United States

- U.S. National Register of Historic Places
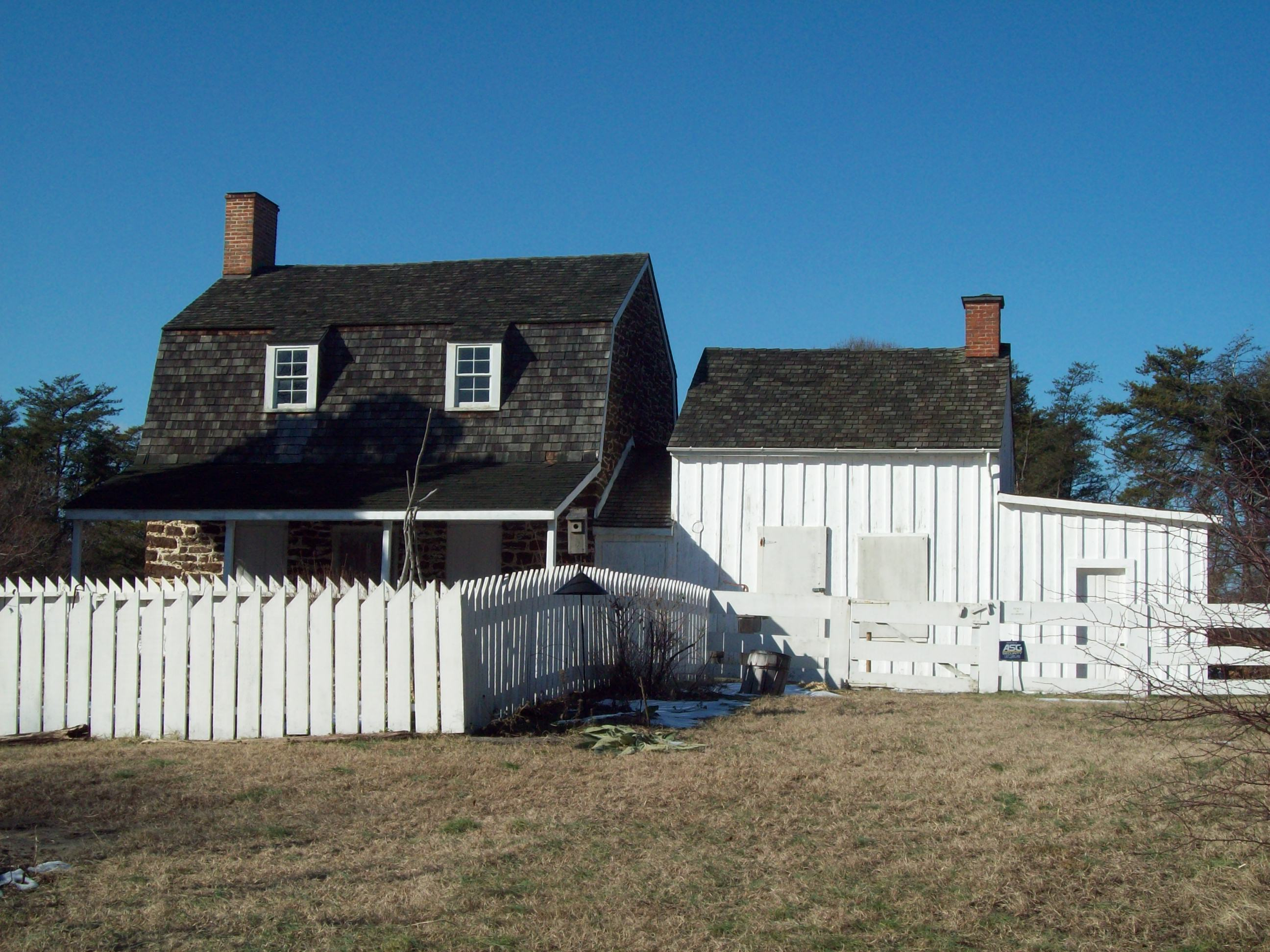
- Hancock's Resolution, December 2009

- Location within Maryland Location within the United States
- Location: E of Pasadena on Bayside Beach Rd., Pasadena, Maryland
- Coordinates: 39°8′6″N 76°26′49″W
- Area: 15 acres (6.1 ha)
- Built: 1670
- NRHP reference No.: 75000865
- Added to NRHP: October 10, 1975

Hancock's Resolution is a historic two-storey gambrel-roofed stone farm house with shed-roofed dormers and interior end chimneys located on a 15-acre (6.1 ha) farm at 2795 Bayside Beach Road in Pasadena, Anne Arundel County, Maryland, United States. In 1785 Stephen Hancock Jr. built the original stone section as the main house for what was then a 410-acre (170 ha) farm. Additions to the house were built in 1855 and in about 1900. Stone and frame outbuildings remain, including a one-storey gable-roofed stone dairy. Hancock's Resolution remained in Hancock family ownership until the deaths in the 1960s of Mary Hancock and her brother, Henry Hancock, who left the property to Anne Arundel County to be preserved. Hancock's Resolution underwent a thorough restoration in 2000 and is now open to the public as a house museum.

On October 10, 1975, Hancock's Resolution was added to the National Register of Historic Places. Included in the designation were the additions, outbuildings and the Hancock family graveyard.

== Gallery ==
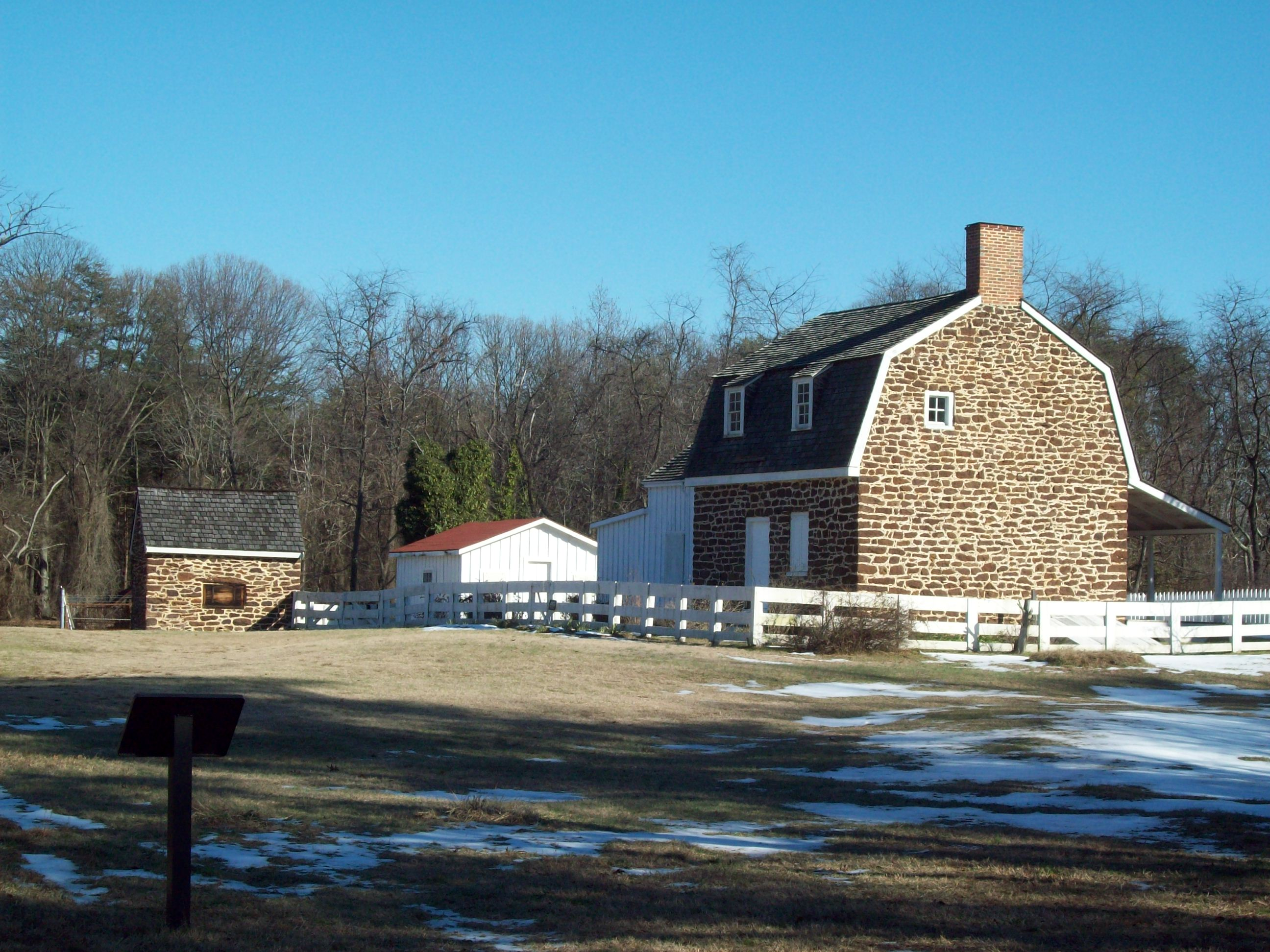
Hancock's Resolution, Side View, December 2009

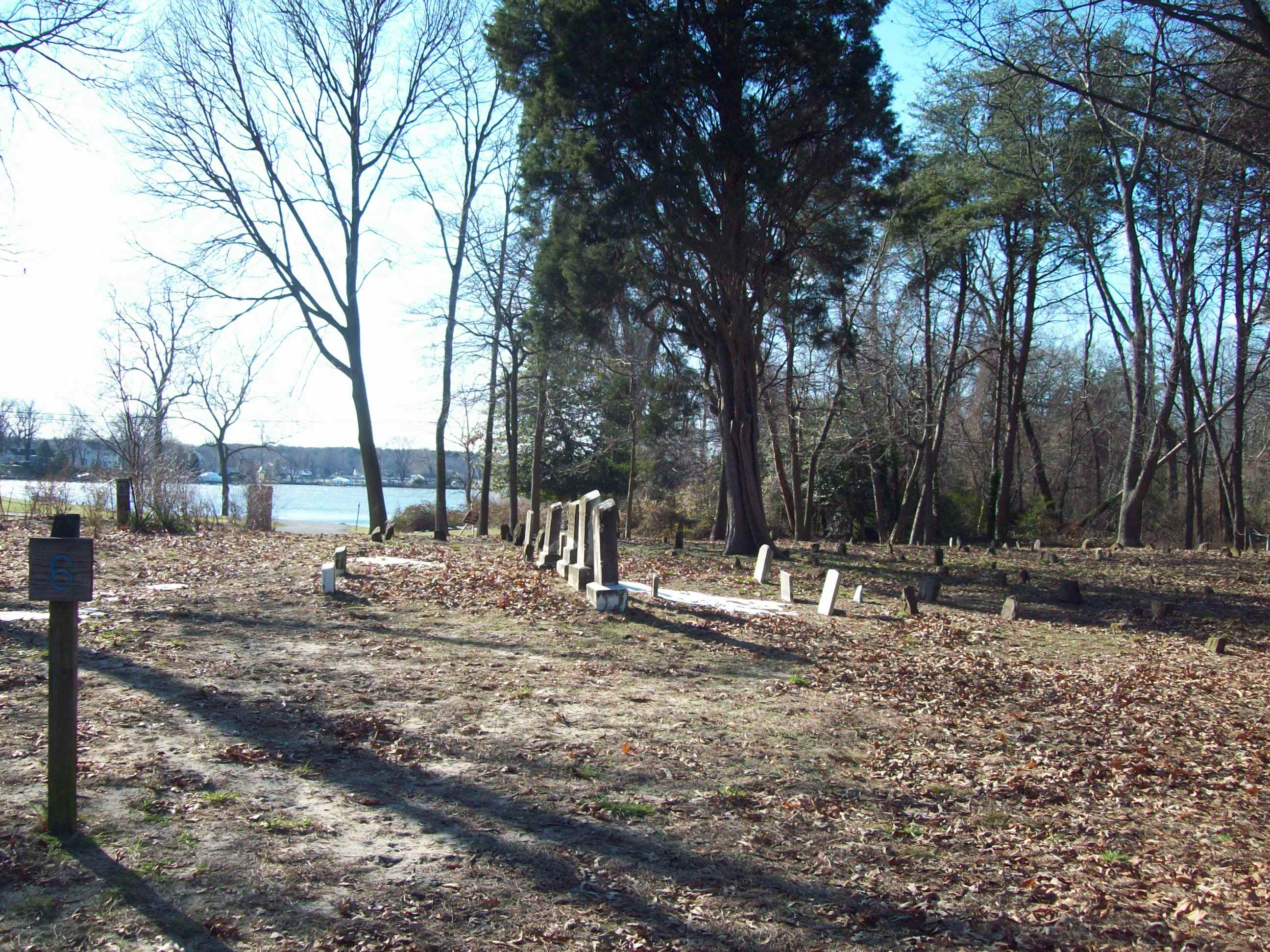
Hancock's Resolution, Cemetery, December 2009
