= Baltimore National Cemetery =

Historic veterans cemetery in Baltimore, Maryland

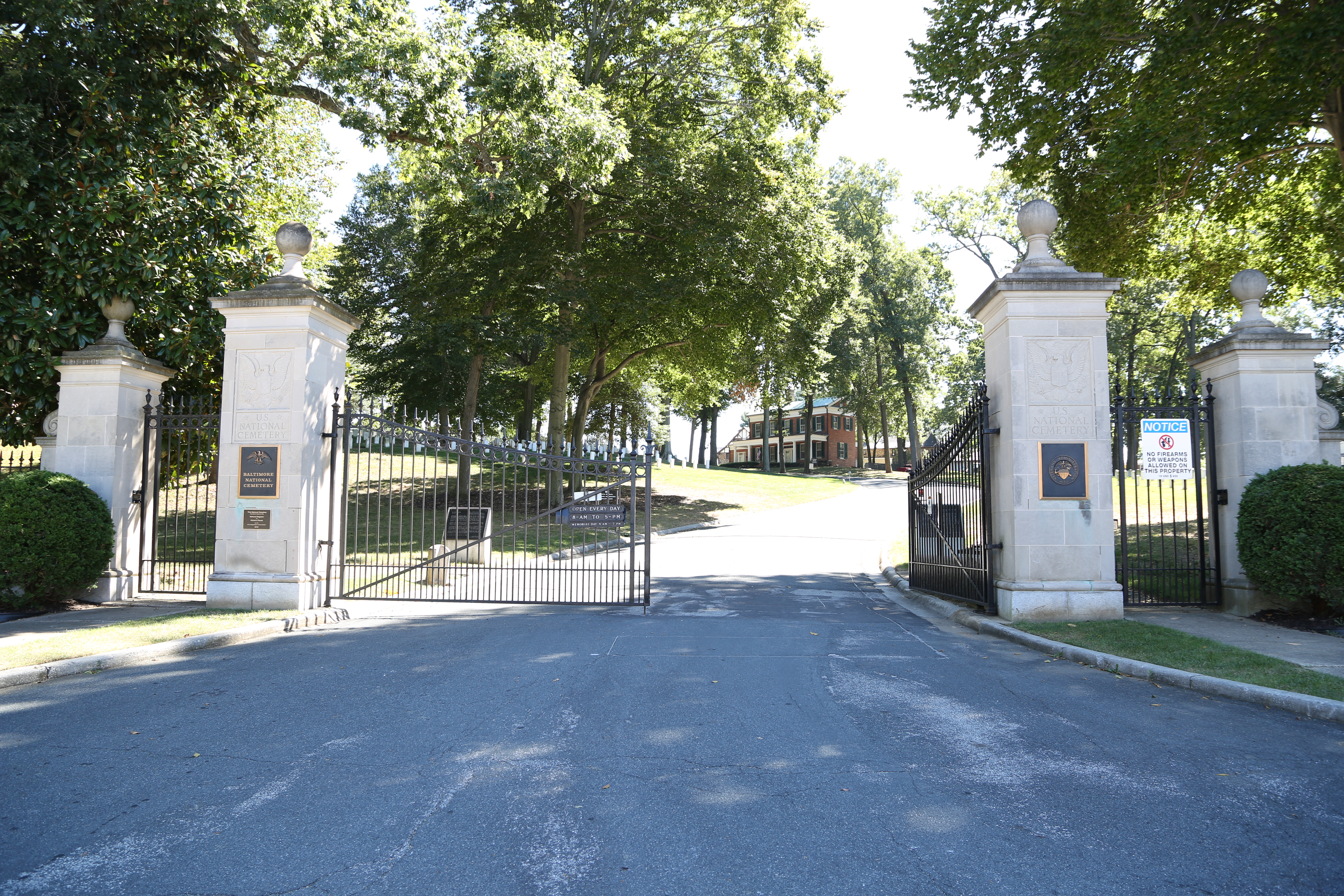
- Baltimore National Cemetery in September 2012
- Interactive map of Baltimore National Cemetery

Details
- Established: 1807
- Location: 5501 Frederick Ave, Baltimore, Maryland
- Country: United States
- Coordinates: 39°16′32″N 76°42′24″W
- Type: Public
- Owned by: US Department of Veterans Affairs
- Size: 72.2 acres (29.2 ha)
- No. of graves: >47,000
- Website: Official website
- Find a Grave: Baltimore National Cemetery
- Baltimore National Cemetery
- U.S. National Register of Historic Places
- NRHP reference No.: 16000059
- Added to NRHP: March 8, 2016

Baltimore National Cemetery is a United States National Cemetery located along Maryland Route 144 on both sides of the boundary between the neighborhoods of Beechfield in Baltimore City and Catonsville in Baltimore County. It encompasses 72.2 acres (29.2 ha). As of 2022, the cemetery has nearly 46,000 interments. It was listed on the National Register of Historic Places in 2016.

A kiosk located on the side of the cemetery's administration building lists the names of veterans and dependents buried in this and two other cemeteries: Annapolis National Cemetery and Loudon Park National Cemetery. The kiosk also provides map locations for each grave.

== History ==
The area of the Baltimore National Cemetery was once part of an elevated site in Baltimore, referred to as early as 1750 as the Cloud-Capped estate. It was originally owned by the Baltimore Company and Charles Carroll of Carrollton. In 1890 it was acquired by Blanchard and Susan Randall. When the nearby Loudon Park National Cemetery was deemed full, the War Department surveyed the area for a new site. In 1936 the federal government took possession of the land for a cost of $95,000, and began converting the estate to "Little Arlington". The old mansion was demolished, fences were put up, roads were constructed, and landscaping was done as part of a Works Progress Administration to invest in infrastructure during the Great Depression. The first interment took place on December 22, 1936, but the cemetery was not formally dedicated until May 30, 1941. In 2019, The Durable Restoration Company provided restoration of the exterior Tudor style stone facade and slate roof.

== Notable monuments ==
The memorial area of the cemetery has monuments representing each of the six United States Marine Corps divisions from World War II.

== Notable interments ==
- Medal of Honor recipients
  - Fireman, First Class Loddie Stupka (1878–1946), Medal of Honor recipient for peacetime service in the United States Navy.
- Other notable burials
  - CW2 Joseph B. Aviles, Sr. (1897–1990), the first Hispanic promoted to chief petty officer and later the first Hispanic to be promoted to chief warrant officer in the United States Coast Guard.
  - Hattie Carroll (1911–1963), murder victim whose death was the subject of Bob Dylan's song "The Lonesome Death of Hattie Carroll".
  - Rear Admiral Leo Otis Colbert (1883–1968), third Director, United States Coast and Geodetic Survey Corps (1938–50).
  - Waters Edward Turpin (1910–1968), author during the Harlem Renaissance, United States Navy

== Gallery ==
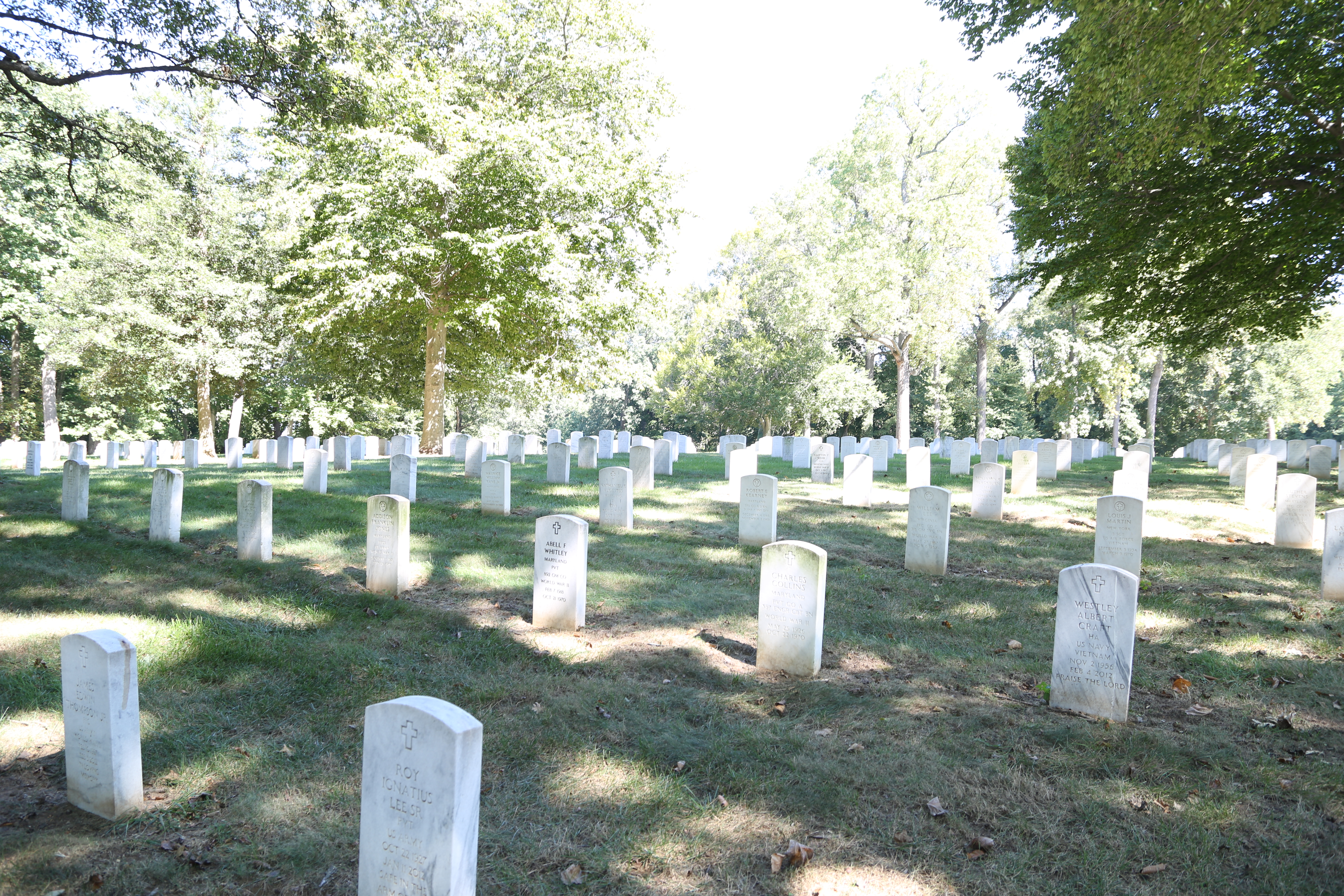
Baltimore National Cemetery September 2016

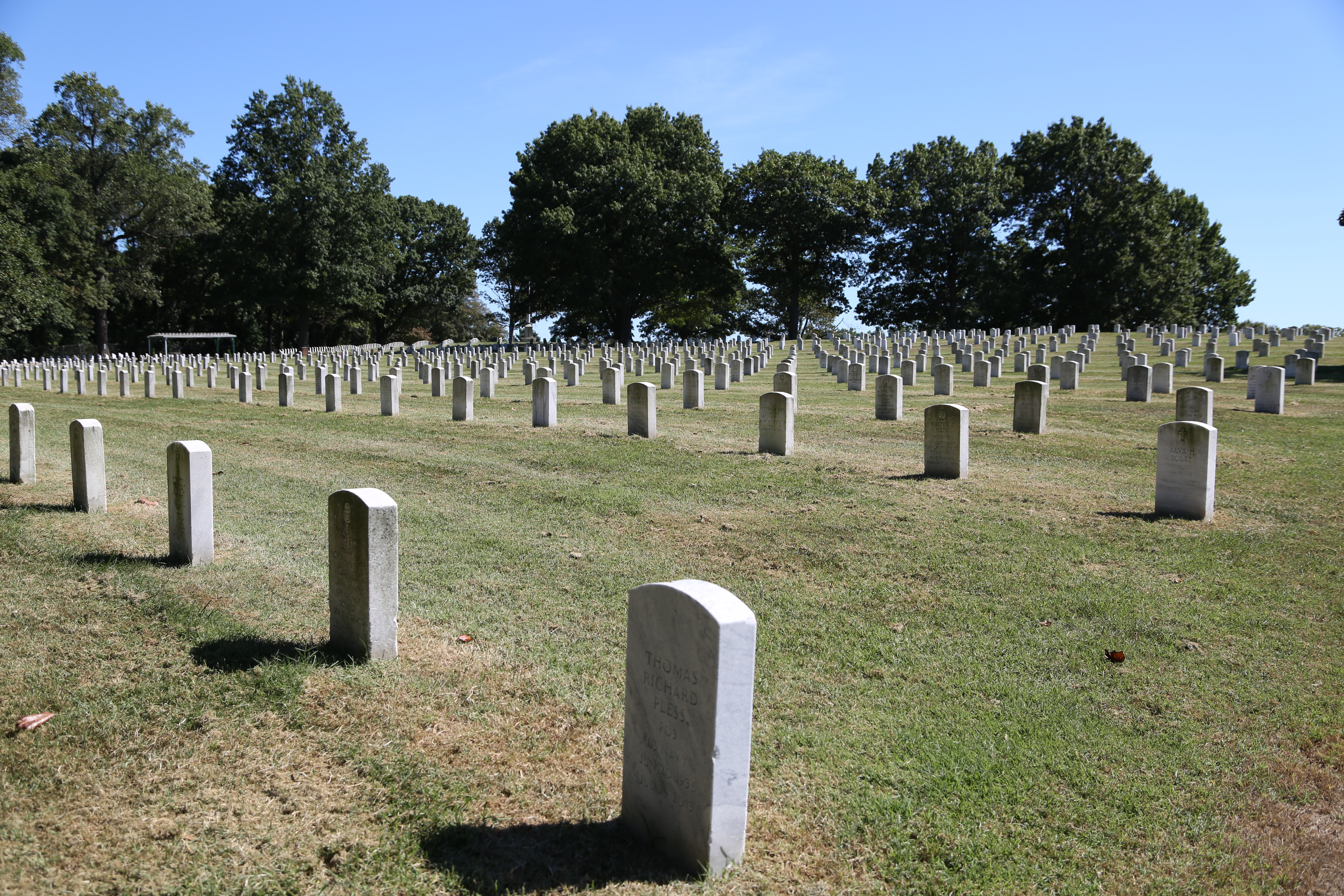
Baltimore National Cemetery September 2016

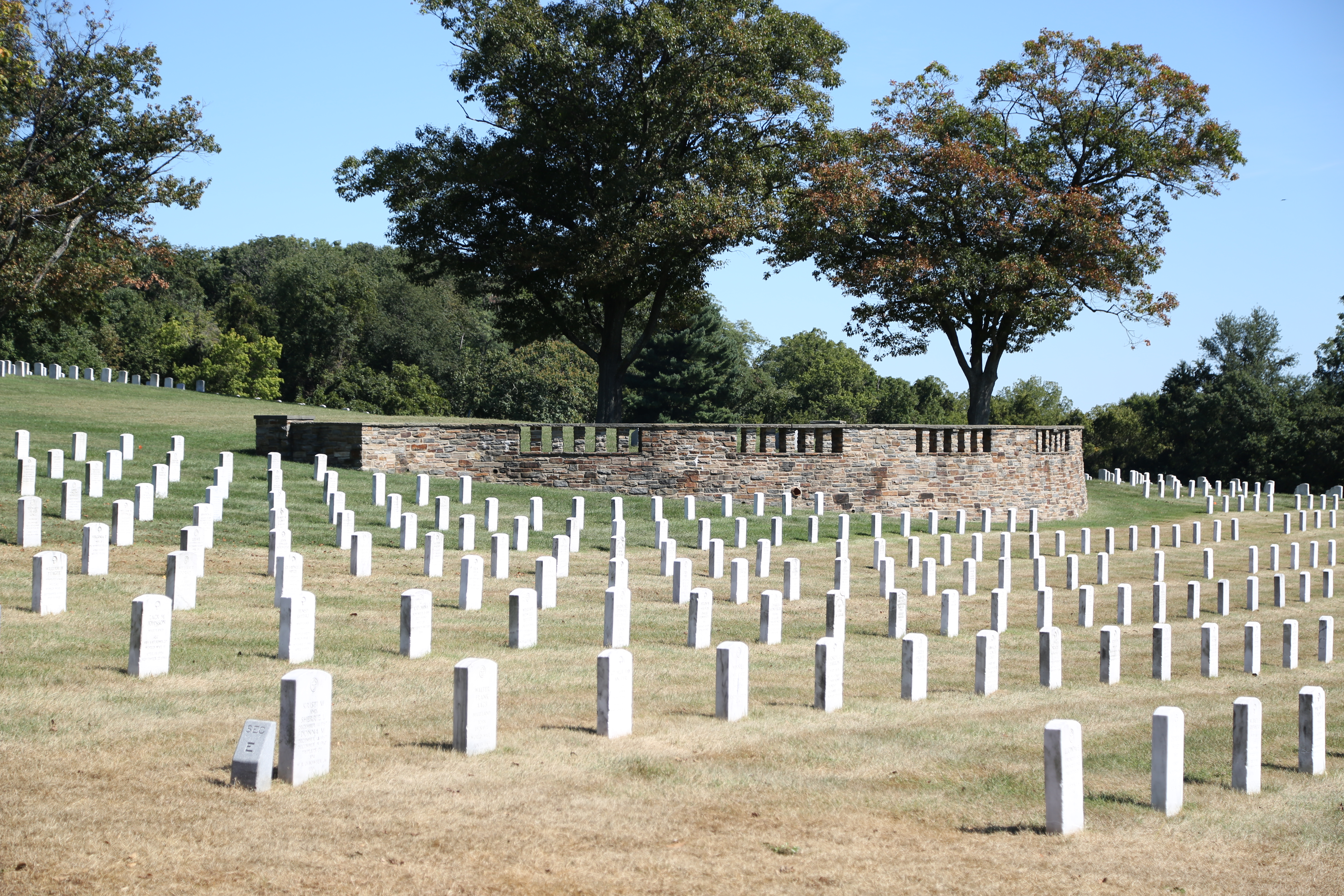
Baltimore National Cemetery September 2016

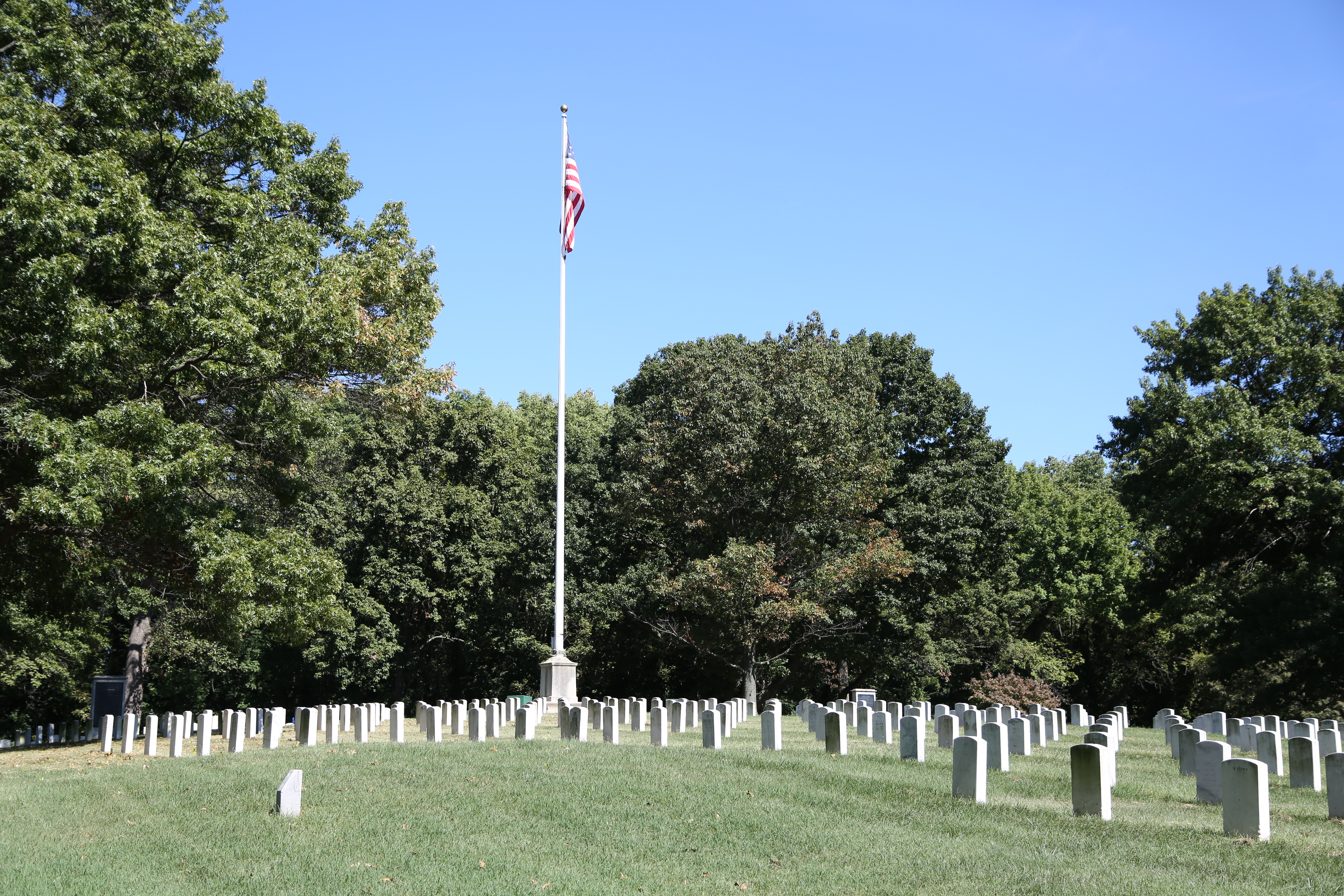
Baltimore National Cemetery, Flag September 2016

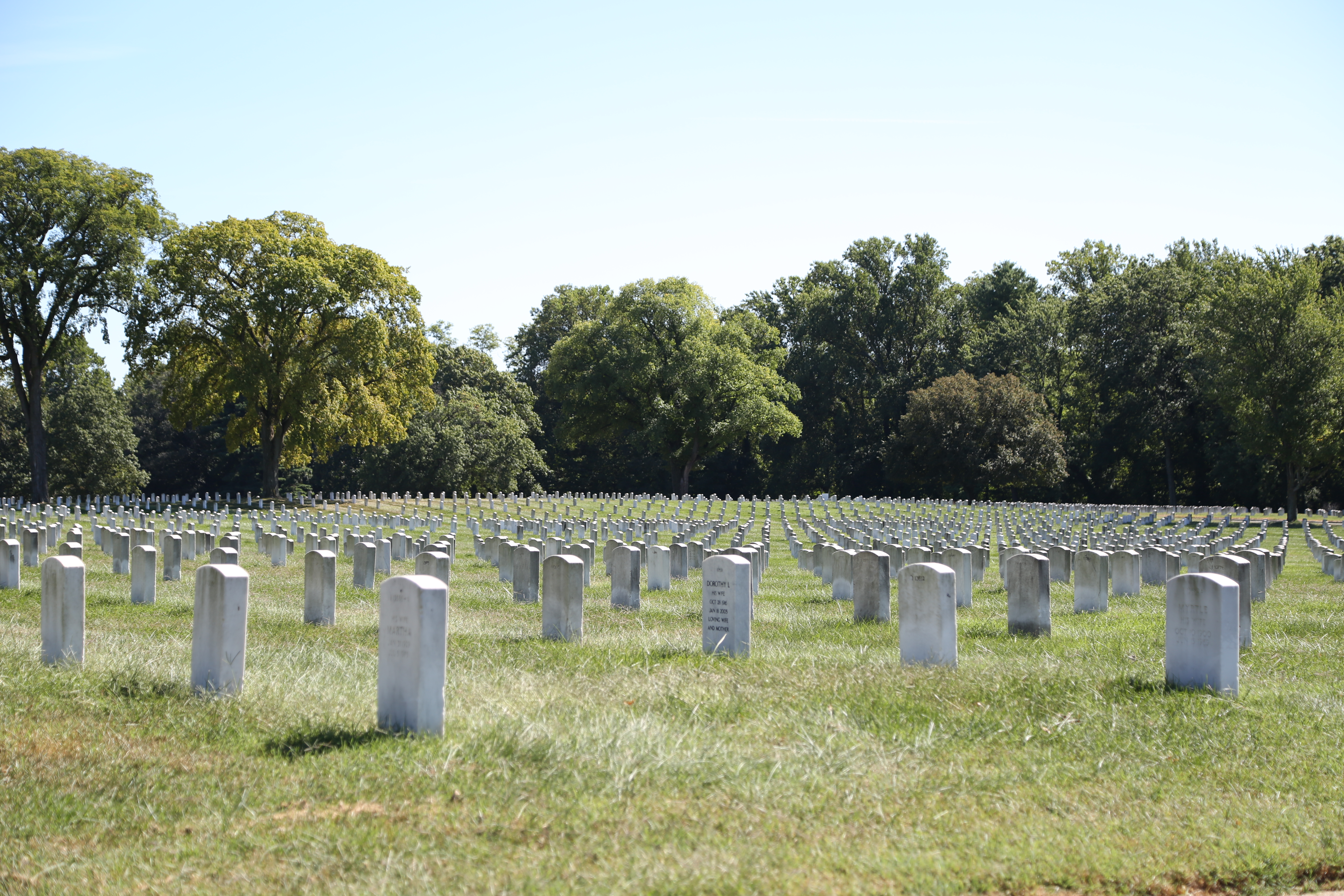
Baltimore National Cemetery September 2016

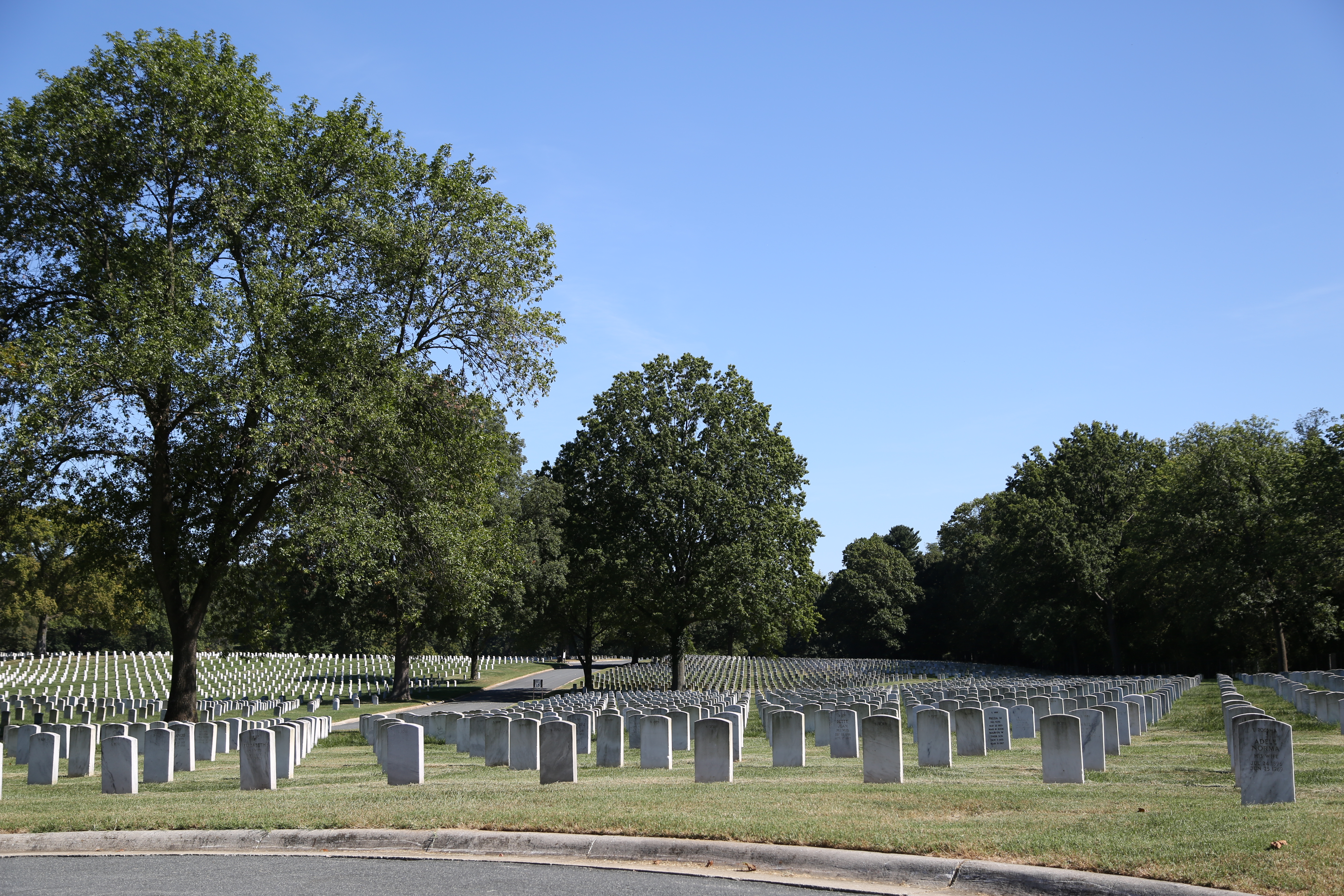
Baltimore National Cemetery September 2016

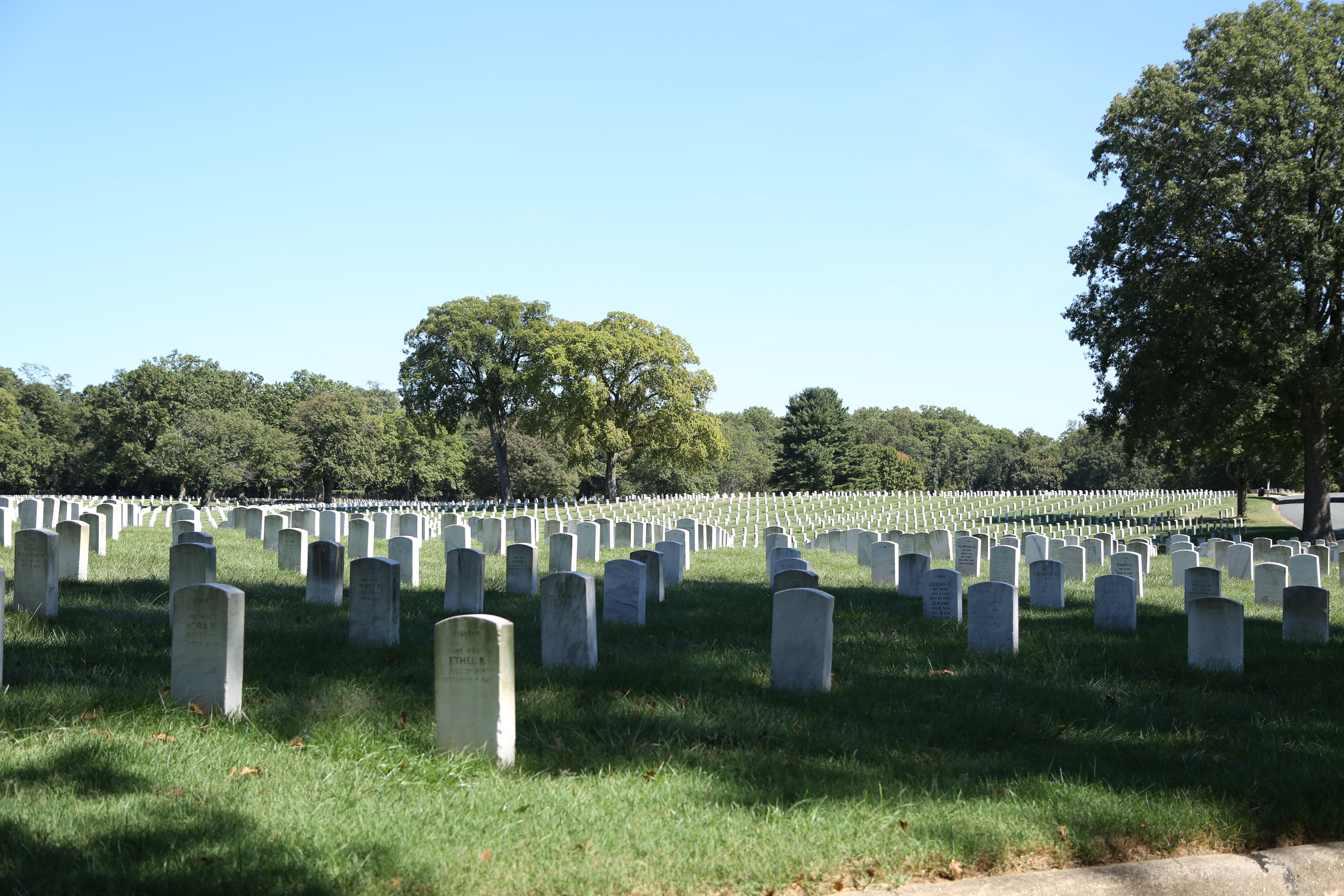
Baltimore National Cemetery September 2016

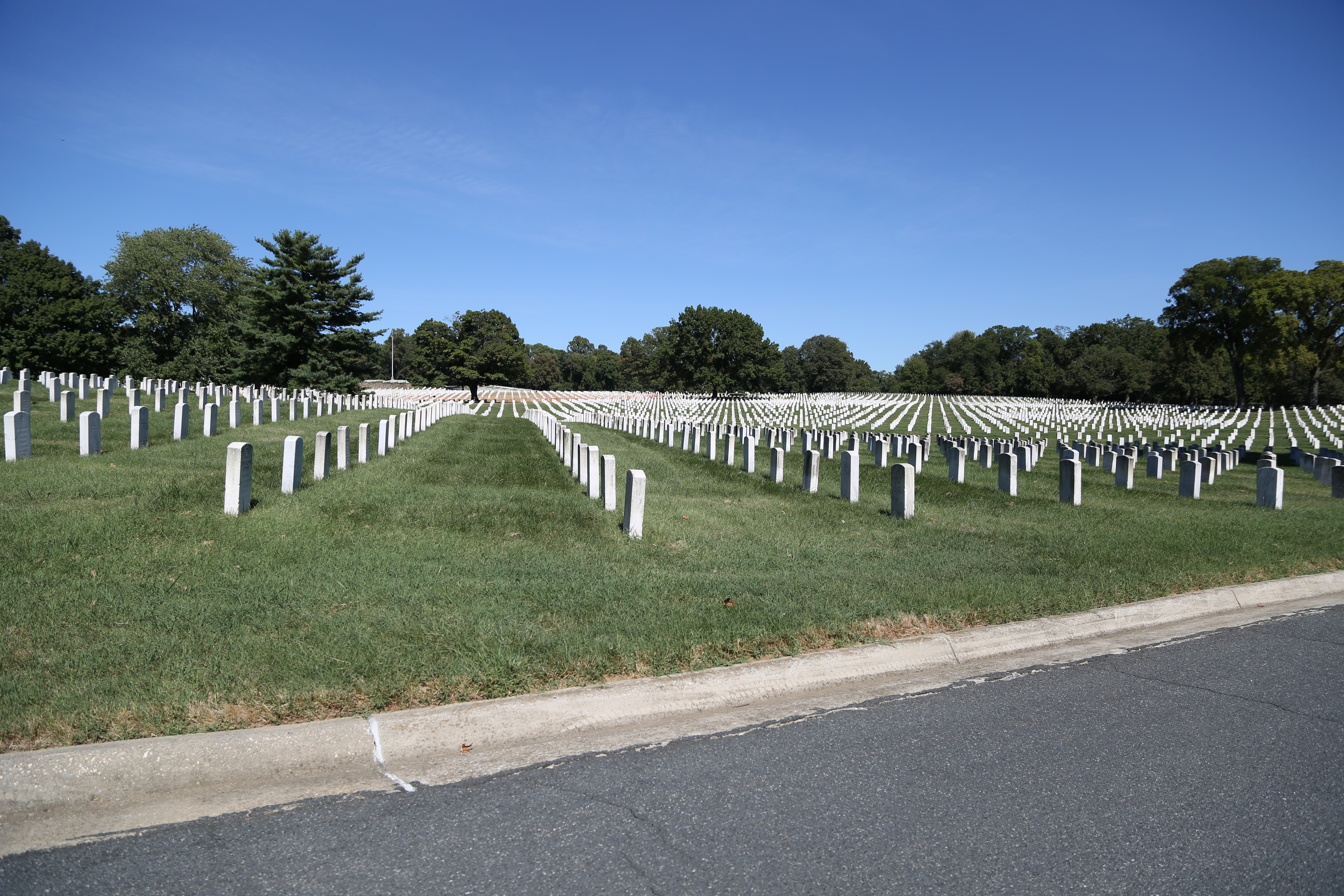
Baltimore National Cemetery September 2016

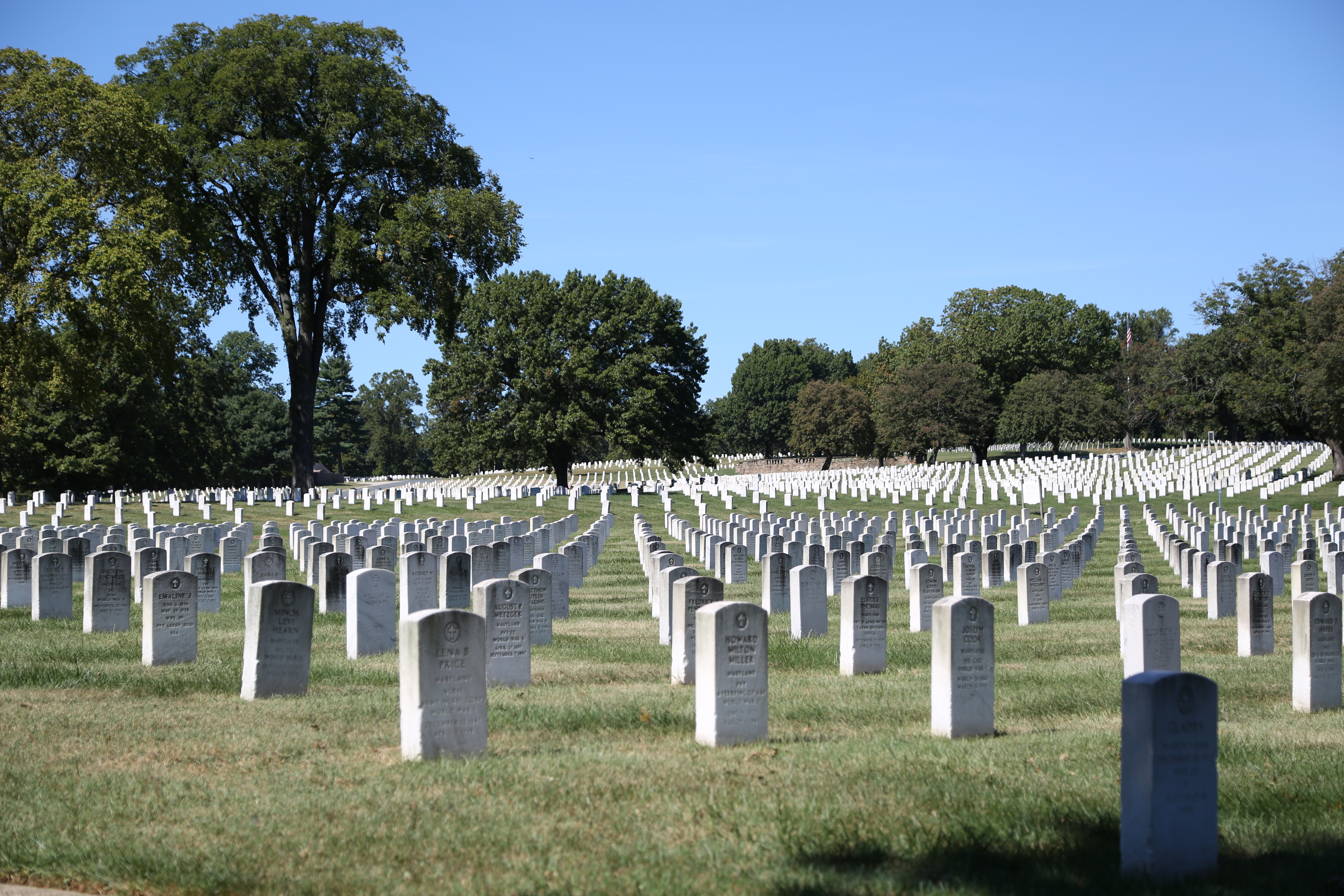
Baltimore National Cemetery September 2016

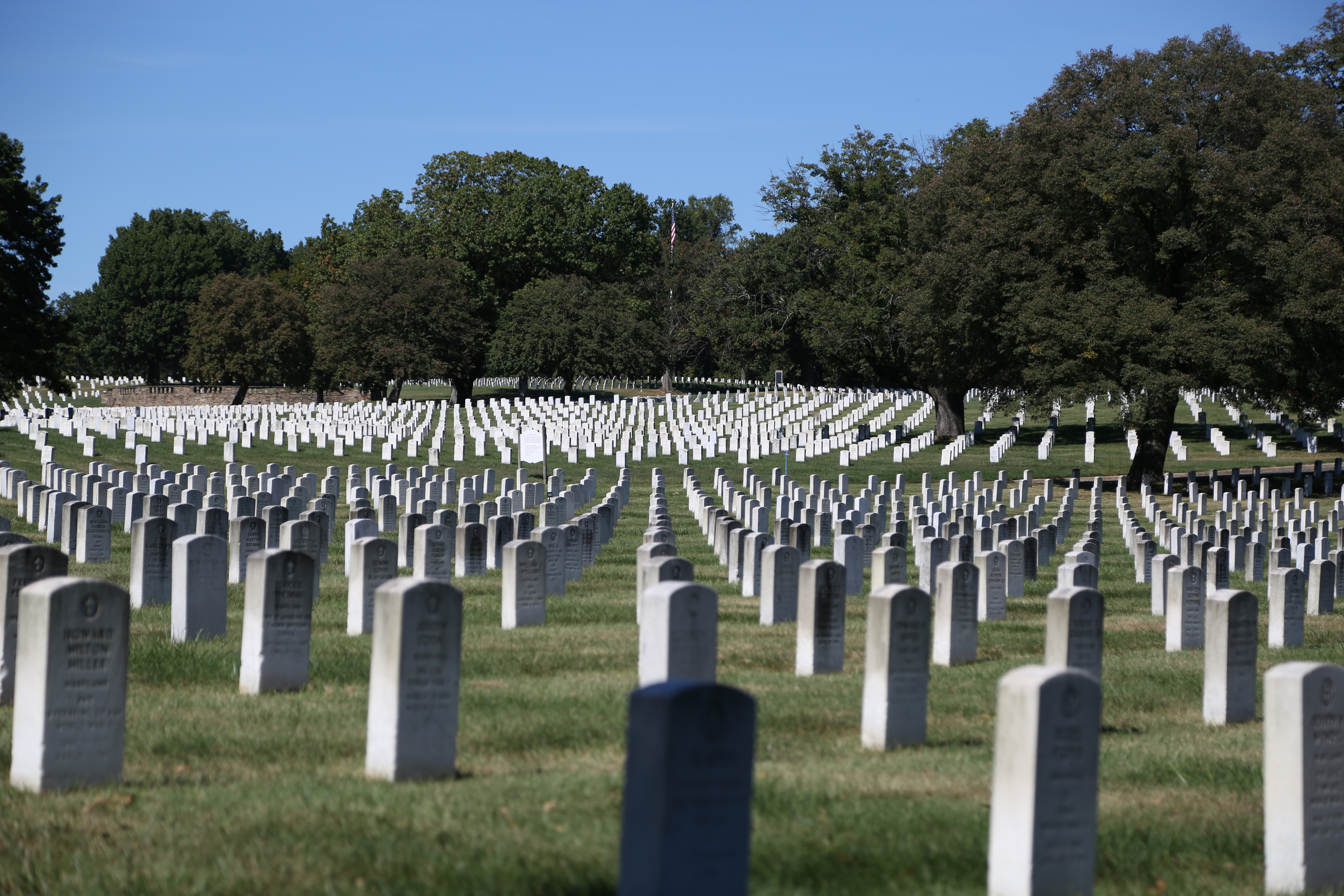
Baltimore National Cemetery September 2016
