= St. John's Lutheran Church (Hagerstown, Maryland) =

Historic Lutheran church in Maryland, US

Coordinates: 39°38′24″N 77°43′20″W

St. John's Evangelical Lutheran Church
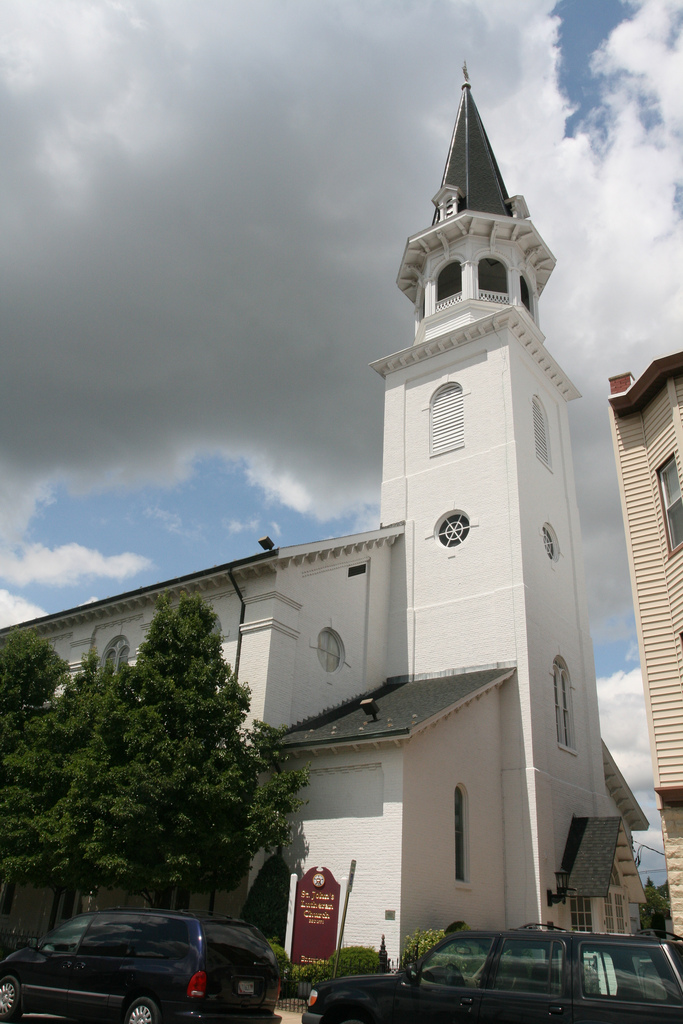
- St. John's Evangelical Lutheran Church
- St. John's Evangelical Lutheran Church
- Location: 141 S. Potomac Street; Hagerstown, Maryland
- Country: USA
- Denomination: Evangelical Lutheran Church in America
- Website: www.stjohnsfamily.org

History
- Founded: 1770

St. John's Lutheran Church, founded in 1770, is a historic Lutheran church located at 141 South Potomac Street in the South end of the arts and entertainment district of Hagerstown, Maryland.

== History ==
In 1769, Jonathan Hager, proprietor of Elizabeth Town (later renamed Hagerstown), deeded lots 131 and 132 to the trustees of the Lutheran congregation for the building of a house of worship. The cornerstone for a log church was laid in 1769 and the congregation was organized in 1770 under the pastorate of the Reverend Charles Frederick Wildbahn. Owing to the congregation's rapid growth, construction began on the present brick structure in 1795, completed in 1806.

St. John's Church was extensively renovated in 1870. Originally, the sanctuary was two stories in height with galleries. During the renovations, the church was completely divided into two stories, with sunday school rooms on the first floor and the sanctuary on the second. To access the second-floor sanctuary, two staircases were built, one on either side of the bell tower. The church was again renovated in 1900 when the former lecture hall which stood next to the church was raised in order to extend the chancel of the church. This addition exhibits Romanesque characteristics, differing from the late-Georgian appearance of the older sections of the building. In the first decade of the twentieth century, further improvements included the addition of four Tiffany stained glass windows, including the "Rabboni" window over the altar, and the installation of two large mosaic panels in the apse of the chancel, depicting the Annunciation, the Nativity, the Crucifixion, and the Ascension. A separate sunday school building was constructed on the church campus in 1921. In 1969, a lightning bolt struck the bell tower, igniting a fire which destroyed the room and ceiling over the church. Rebuilding commenced and was completed within a year to celebrate the two hundredth anniversary of the church's organization.

== Architecture ==
The 1795-1806 brick structure of the church represents late Georgian design characteristics, notably the symmetrical placement of window and door openings, the use of round-headed arches over the upper windows, and the use of Flemish bond brickwork. The side walls of the church, including the elevation which fronts South Potomac Street, are accented by shallow pilasters and corbeled brick cornices. The 1900 chancel extension, located at the south end of the church, displays Romanesque design with paired-Roman arches.

The interior of the nave is covered by a barrel-vaulted ceiling and is lit by five large stained glass windows on each side. The chancel dado is paneled and covered by a rib vaulted ceiling over the three-sided apse. The vaults are decorated by frescoes. The first and third panels of the apse are covered with mosaic panels, framing the central panel which contains a stained glass window.

== Gallery ==
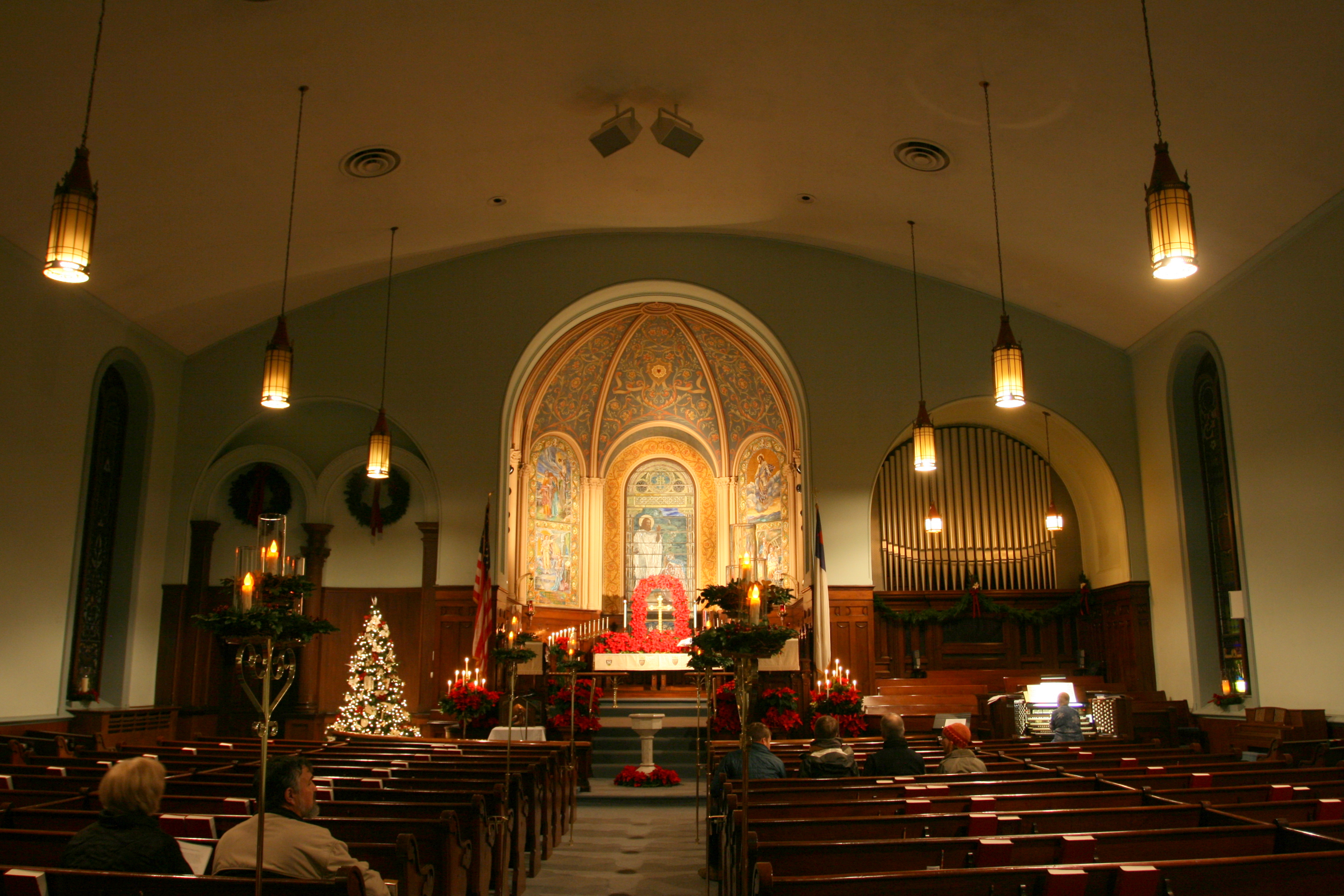

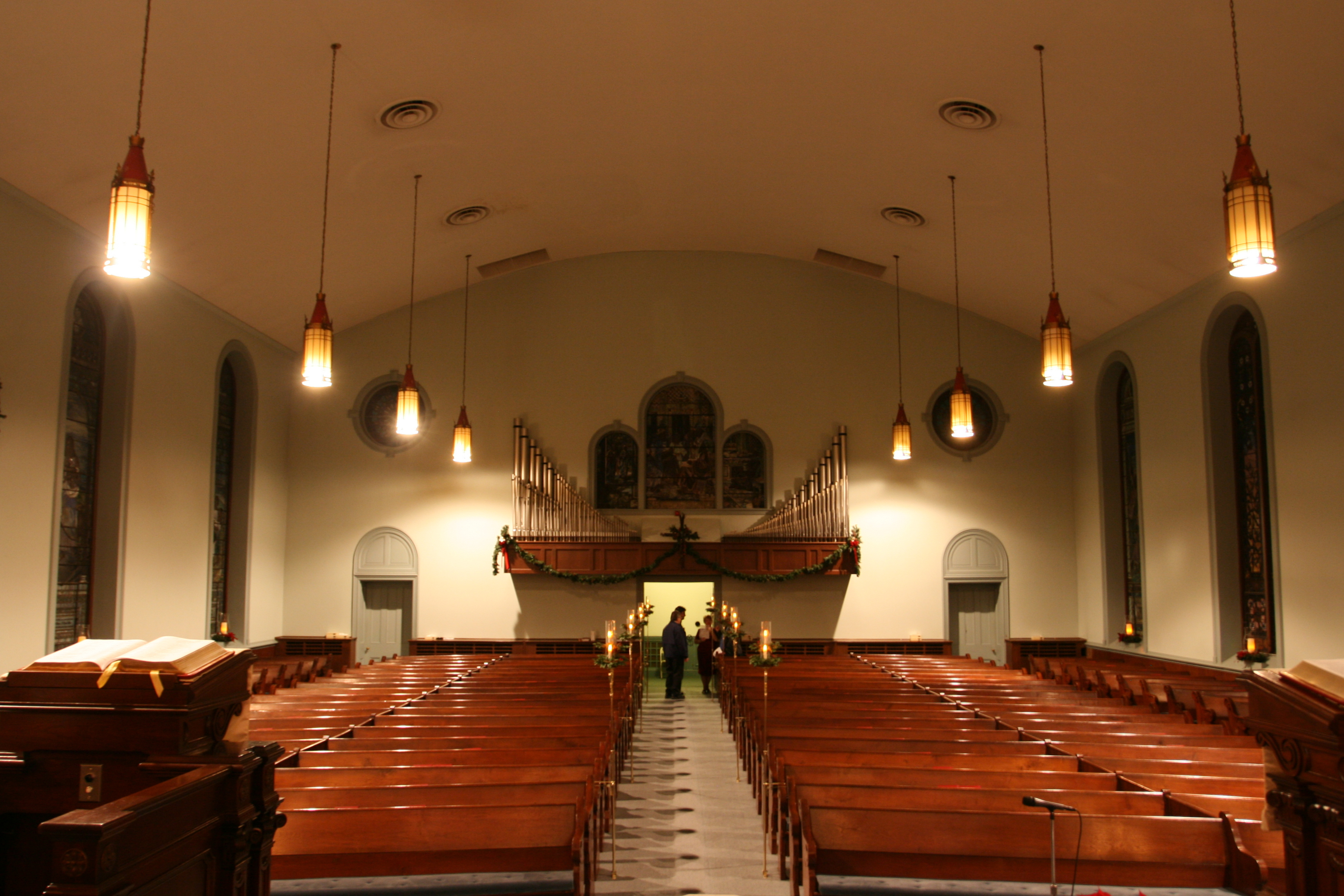

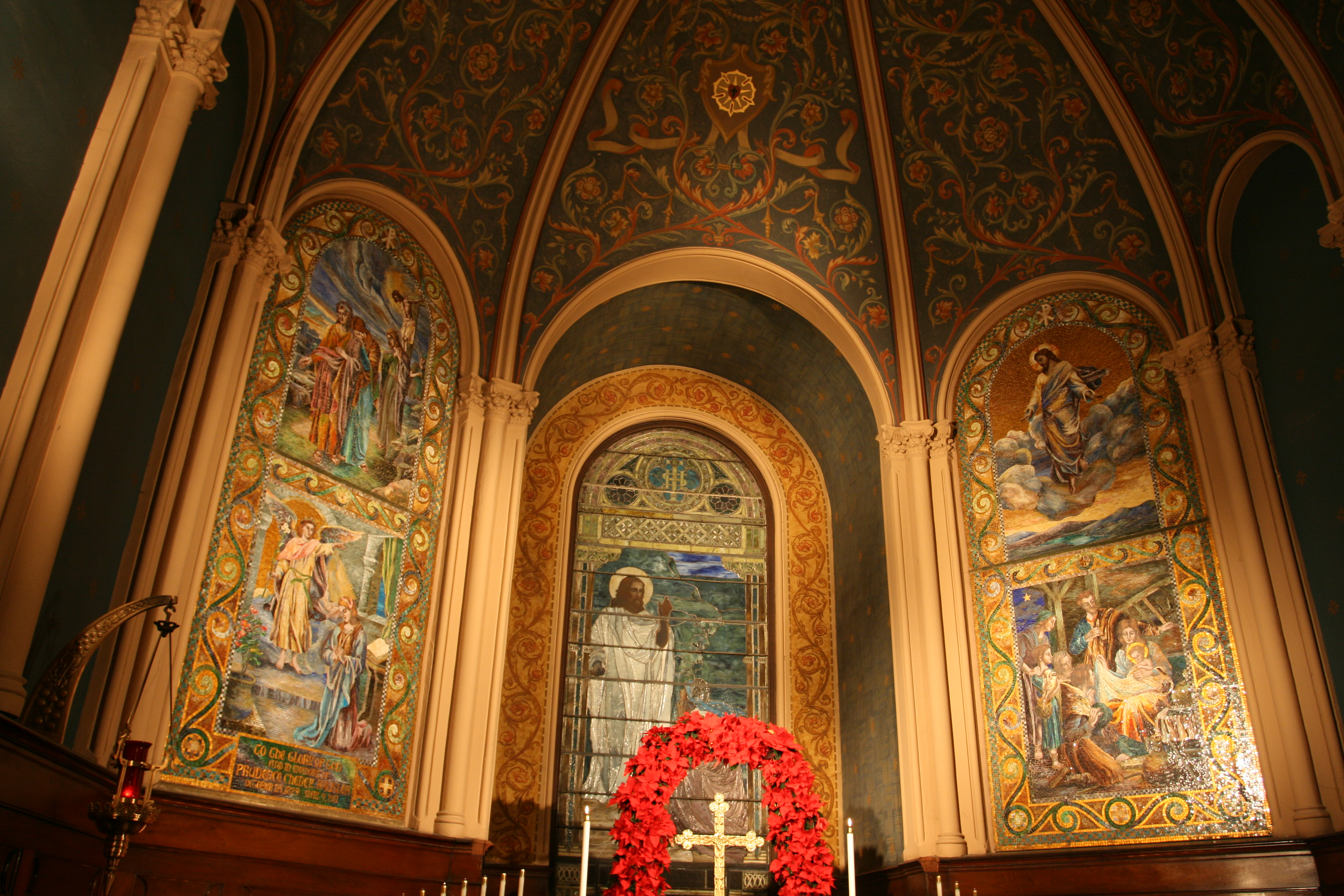
