= Wilkins Estate =

Historic estate in Rockville, Maryland

Coordinates: 39°3′58″N 77°6′30″W

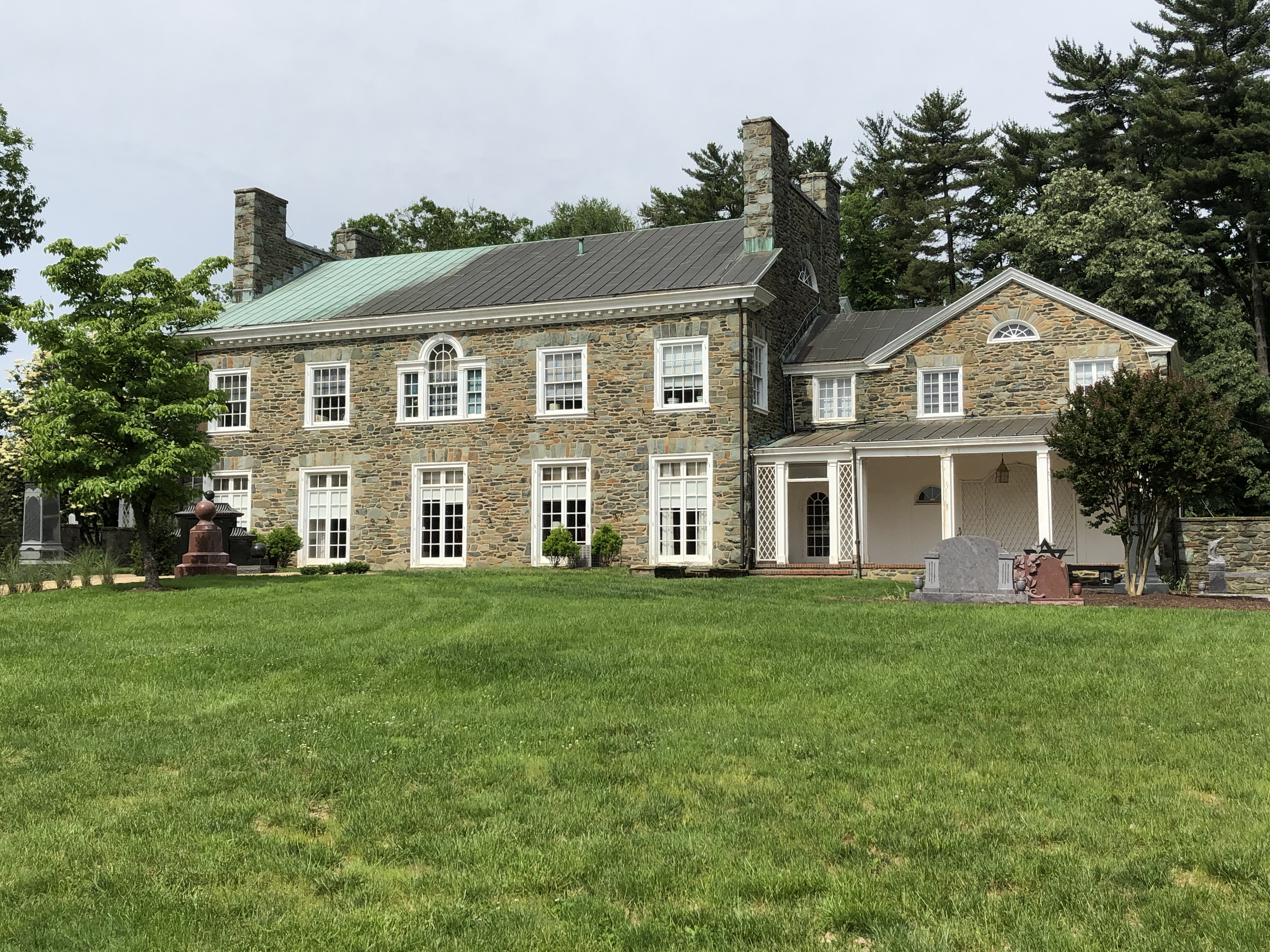

The Wilkins Estate is a historic estate in Rockville, Maryland, United States. It was built in 1916 by Robert Crew Wilkins, later an executive of the Wilkins Coffee Co. (later a part of Maxwell House coffee), founded in 1923 in Washington, D.C., by a relation, John H. Wilkins, Sr.

== Wilkins era ==
Robert Wilkins had the estate built with the intention of using it as his summer home. The mansion on the grounds was designed by a noted architect, John Russell Pope, in the Classical Revival style and is considered a historic site. The estate later passed to his brother, John Franklin Wilkins.

== Parklawn Memorial Park & Menorah Gardens ==
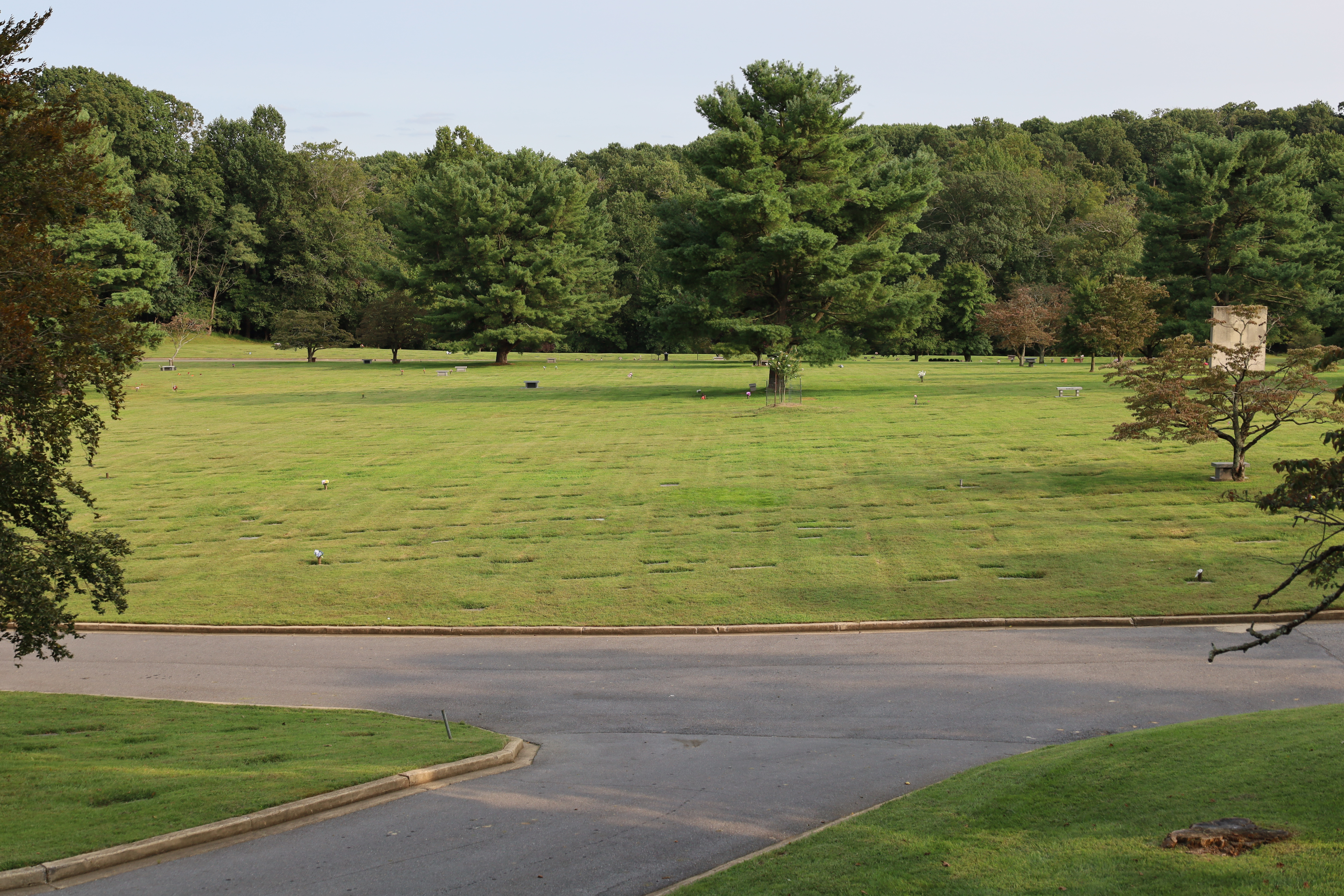
Parklawn Memorial Park & Menorah Gardens

The estate passed out of family hands in 1950, being sold to George Moss, who opened Parklawn Memorial Park & Menorah Gardens on the property the following year. The Marlowe family soon purchased an interest in it in 1958 and full ownership in 1986. Stewart Enterprises bought the cemetery in 1992.

The mansion serves as the cemetery office. The grounds of the cemetery have expanded to hold the remains of some 5,000 people.
