= Washington Confederate Cemetery =

Portion of the Rose Hill Cemetery in Washington County, Maryland, US

- Est. by State of Maryland
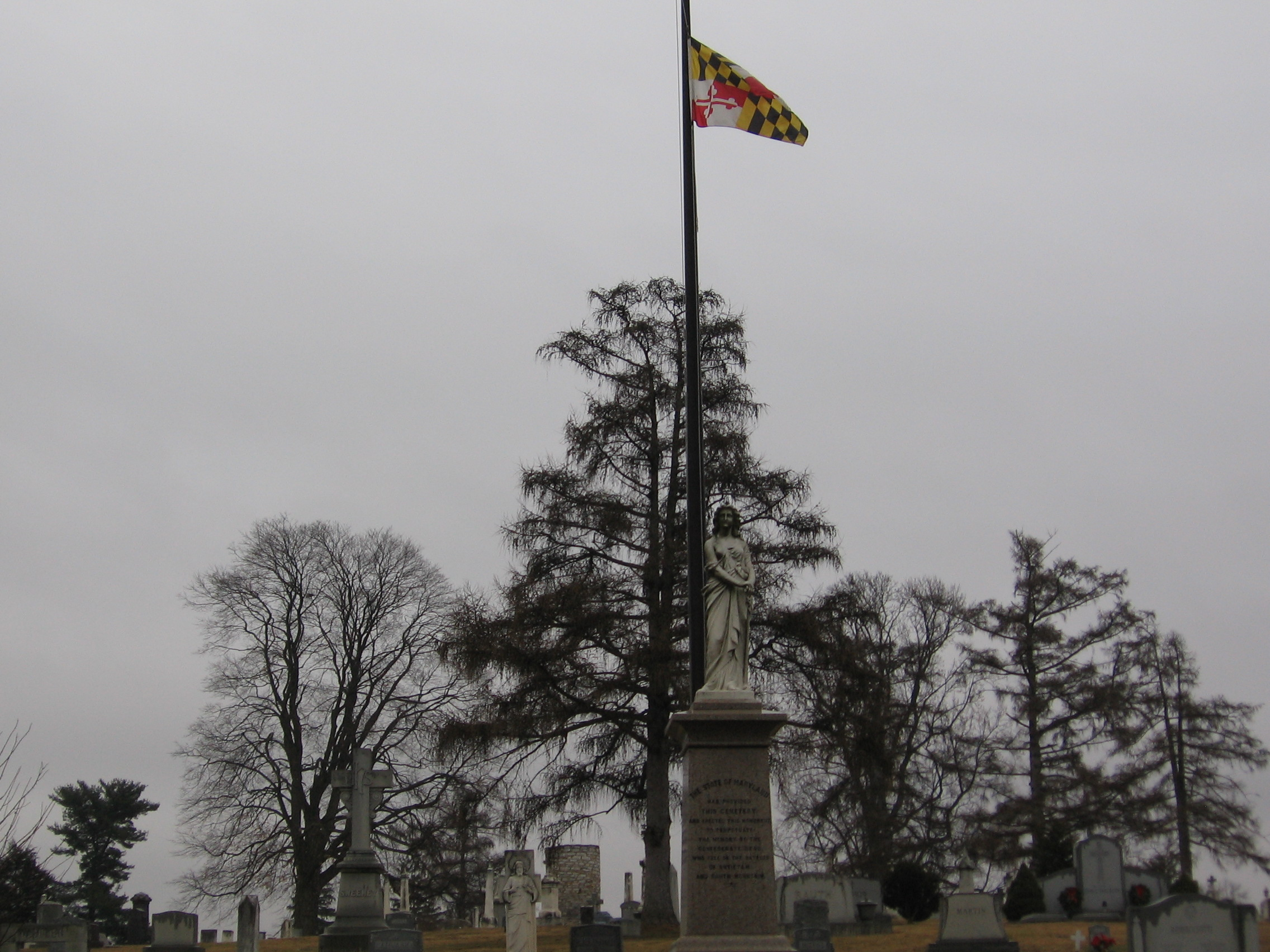
- For Confederate soldiers
- Established: 1871
- Unveiled: 1877
- Location: 39°37′44″N 77°43′19″W near Hagerstown, Maryland
- Total burials: 2,000
- Unknowns: 1,664
- Commemorated: ~2000

Burials by nation
- Confederate States of America

Burials by war
- American Civil War

The Washington Confederate Cemetery is a Confederate Cemetery in Hagerstown, Maryland. Its burials include Confederate dead from such nearby battles as Antietam, Gettysburg, Monocacy and South Mountain. Less than 20 percent of its burials are identified. It was established in 1871 as a section of the Rose Hill Cemetery (Maryland).

== History ==
In 1869, Governor Oden Bowie, of Maryland, requested that the state should take care of the Confederate dead from the battlefields of western Maryland. Wind, water, and animals had exposed the dead, hurriedly buried in shallow graves. Governor Bowie requested that Thomas Boullt of Hagerstown, Maryland, one of the Trustees for Maryland in the Antietam Cemetery, employ men to find and identify the Confederate dead buried in Washington and Frederick counties. Moses Poffinberger and Aaron Good of Sharpsburg identified ad hoc burial sites from throughout the western part of the state, primarily from the battlefields at Antietam, Monocacy and South Mountain, but also from skirmishes and from Robert E. Lee's retreat from Gettysburg.

In 1871 the Maryland General Assembly bought land in Hagerstown, Maryland, from the newly established (1865) Rose Hill Cemetery. With this land, the Assembly created the Washington Confederate Cemetery as part of the larger public cemetery. The States of Maryland, Virginia and West Virginia removed more than 2,000 dead from battlefield and skirmish sites and reburied them in the cemetery. In the course of removal and reburial, only 346 soldiers were identified.

One of the identified dead, Isaac E. Avery, died in action on July 2, 1863, at the Battle of Gettysburg. On that evening, his brigade stormed Cemetery Hill, trying to dislodge the Union forces. Halfway up the hill, he was hit in the throat by a musket ball. Mortally wounded, he fell from his horse. He scrawled his final words on a piece of paper: "Tell my father I died with my face to the enemy." Avery's body was carried as far as Williamsport, Maryland and buried there, but moved to the Washington Confederate Cemetery. A plaque was placed in the cemetery for him in 2007.

== Monument ==
The Statue of Hope Monument was placed on February 28, 1877, and dedicated on June 15, 1877. The dedication speaker was General Fitzhugh Lee, nephew of Robert E. Lee, and himself a cavalry general officer in the American Civil War. The monument inscription reads: "The State of Maryland has provided this cemetery and erected this monument to perpetuate the memory of the Confederate dead who fell in the Battles of Antietam and South Mountain." Standing 19 feet (5.8 m) high, overlooks the section of the 110 acres (45 ha) Rose Hill Cemetery where the Confederate dead are buried. On September 3, 1961, the monument was rededicated with former President Dwight D. Eisenhower as the guest speaker.

== Rose Hill Cemetery ==
Washington Confederate Cemetery is a cemetery within a cemetery: a subsection of the Rose Hill Cemetery (Maryland), established in 1865, located at 600 South Potomac Street Hagerstown, MD. The Rose Hill site was originally part of a tract of land granted to the Wroe family by the King of England; the Wroe home was located on a hill, subsequently becoming known as "Wroe's Hill". In 1865, the state legislature chartered the property as a cemetery for the citizens of Washington County, Maryland, and changed the name to Rose Hill.
