= J. Harvie Wilkinson III =

American judge (born 1944)

Harvie Wilkinson
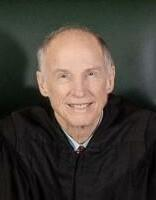
- Wilkinson in 2022

Chief Judge of the United States Court of Appeals for the Fourth Circuit
- In office February 14, 1996 – February 15, 2003
- Preceded by: Samuel James Ervin III
- Succeeded by: William Walter Wilkins

Judge of the United States Court of Appeals for the Fourth Circuit
- Incumbent
- Assumed office August 13, 1984
- Appointed by: Ronald Reagan
- Preceded by: John D. Butzner Jr.

Personal details
- Born: James Harvie Wilkinson III; September 29, 1944 (age 81) New York City, New York, U.S.
- Party: Republican
- Spouse: Lossie Grist Noell (m. 1973)
- Children: 2
- Relatives: Jeff Wall (son-in-law)
- Education: Yale University (BA); University of Virginia (JD)

James Harvie Wilkinson III (born September 29, 1944) is an American attorney and jurist who has served as a United States circuit judge on the United States Court of Appeals for the Fourth Circuit since 1984. He was appointed to the Fourth Circuit by President Ronald Reagan and he served as chief judge of the circuit from 1996 to 2003.

== Early and family life ==
Wilkinson was born in New York City, to Alice Culbreth Wilkinson and J. Harvie Wilkinson Jr. He was raised in Richmond, Virginia, where he attended St. Christopher's School during the state's Massive Resistance crisis concerning desegregation of the public schools. His father (CEO of State Planters Bank, later part of Crestar Bank) joined to support Governor J. Lindsay Almond with Norfolk and Western Railroad CEO Stuart Saunders and Richmond School Board President (and later Supreme Court Justice) Lewis F. Powell and others. Almond had broken with the Byrd Organization and adhered to the decisions of the Virginia Supreme Court and a three judge federal panel on January 19, 1959 that declared as unconstitutional certain new laws designed to maintain segregation.

Wilkinson attended the Lawrenceville School in New Jersey, then Yale University, where he was a member of St. Anthony Hall, chairman of the Conservative Party of the Yale Political Union, and later the Political Union's president. Following graduation with honors from Yale with a Bachelor of Arts degree in 1967, he published his first book, Harry Byrd and The Changing Face of Virginia Politics, 1945–1966 (1968)

Wilkinson enlisted in the United States Army in 1968 and served until 1969. Upon leaving the army, Wilkinson began law school at the University of Virginia School of Law in Charlottesville. In 1970, after completing only one year, Wilkinson took a leave of absence to run (at age 25) for a Virginia seat in the United States House of Representatives. He ran as a Republican against 3-term incumbent Democrat David E. Satterfield III and later he joked about losing by a significant margin, noting that Satterfield had a billboard urging voters to send Wilkinson back to law school. Wilkinson then resumed his legal studies and was awarded a Juris Doctor in 1972 and soon passed the Virginia bar exam.

Wilkinson and his wife, Lossie, have two children. Their daughter Porter Wilkinson also clerked for the United States Supreme Court, serving in the chambers of Chief Justice John Roberts in 2007–2008. She is married to prominent appellate attorney Jeff Wall.

== Early legal, teaching, and writing career ==
After graduation from law school, Wilkinson served as a law clerk to newly confirmed U.S. Supreme Court justice Lewis F. Powell Jr., a longtime family friend, from 1972 to 1973. After his clerkship, Wilkinson declined joining a large law firm. Instead, he returned to Charlottesville and became a professor of law at the University of Virginia, where he taught as an associate professor for five years. Wilkinson also wrote and published his second book, about his clerkship with Justice Powell: Serving Justice: A Supreme Court Clerk's View (1974).

Wilkinson spent three years (1978–1981) working for Norfolk's The Virginian-Pilot, including as editorial page editor. He later credited this with broadening his practical experience of both government at many levels, and with people in all walks of life, as well as helping his time management skills. In 1979, Wilkinson published his third book, From Brown to Bakke. In 1982, Wilkinson resumed his legal career, joining the Civil Rights Division of the U.S. Department of Justice, eventually becoming deputy assistant attorney general. He returned to teaching at the University of Virginia School of Law in 1983.

== Federal judicial service ==
On November 10, 1983, as Wilkinson briefly returned to teach at the University of Virginia School of Law as a full professor, President Ronald Reagan nominated him to the Fourth Circuit seat vacated by Judge John D. Butzner Jr., who had recently retired. Despite some controversy and after hearings on November 16, 1983, and February 22, 1984, the United States Senate confirmed Wilkinson on August 9, 1984, by a 58–39 vote. He received his commission on August 13, 1984.

Wilkinson served as the chief judge of the Fourth Circuit from 1996 to 2003, during which time he wrote and published his fourth book, One Nation Indivisible: How Ethnic Separatism Threatens America (1997). In 2003, Judge Wilkinson wrote the majority opinion upholding the right of the United States government to detain Yaser Esam Hamdi indefinitely without access to counsel or a court. Hamdi was a U.S. citizen captured during the U.S. invasion of Afghanistan, and the U.S. Supreme Court ultimately overturned that decision.

As early as August 2000, Wilkinson was viewed as a potential Supreme Court nominee should George W. Bush win the 2000 presidential election. With the announcement of Chief Justice Rehnquist's illness in the fall of 2004, NPR reported Wilkinson remained on the short list as a potential replacement. After Bush was re-elected in 2004, Wilkinson was viewed as amongst Bush's favorites as a potential new Chief Justice. Wilkinson agreed to an interview with the New York Times, reportedly undermining his candidacy amongst the Bush inner circle.

In 2006, Wilkinson penned an op-ed article in The Washington Post, castigating both the left and right on the issue of gay marriage. Writing that the "American constitutional tradition" has been a "chief casualty in the struggle over same-sex marriage", Wilkinson opined that marriage should be regulated through ordinary legislative means and he opposed "the rush to constitutionalize" the dispute.

On June 24, 2008, Wilkinson authored a concurring opinion in Richmond Medical Center For Women v. Herring that upheld the Virginia ban on partial-birth abortions. In his concurrence, he voiced a strong opposition to the practice of partial-birth abortions:

The fact is that we—civilized people—are retreating to the haven of our Constitution to justify dismembering a partly born child and crushing its skull. Surely centuries hence, people will look back on this gruesome practice done in the name of fundamental law by a society of high achievement. And they will shudder."

In 2012, Wilkinson published his fifth book (and second through Oxford University Press), Cosmic Constitutional Theory: Why Americans Are Losing Their Inalienable Right to Self-Governance. The following year, Wilkinson wrote an opinion upholding the Baltimore Ravens use of its previously used "Flying B" logo in videos, photographs, and displays as fair use.

In 2016, Wilkinson dissented when Judge G. Steven Agee found that sectarian prayers offered by Rowan County, North Carolina commissioners at their meetings did not violate the Establishment Clause of the United States Constitution. That judgment was rejected by the full circuit en banc by a vote of 10–5, with Wilkinson now writing for the majority while Agee and Paul V. Niemeyer authored dissents. In June 2018, the Supreme Court of the United States denied review, over the written dissent of Justice Clarence Thomas joined by Neil Gorsuch.

In 2017 Wilkinson published All Falling Faiths: Reflections on the Promise and Failure of the 1960s.

In March 2018, Wilkinson wrote a dissent when the circuit denied en banc rehearing to a divided panel conclusion that the Bladensburg Peace Cross memorial from World War I now violated the Constitution's Establishment Clause. The Fourth Circuit judgment was reversed by the U.S. Supreme Court in American Legion v. American Humanist Association (2019).

In August 2018, Wilkinson wrote for the panel majority when it found that the Constitution's Eighth Amendment did not prevent Virginia from criminally prohibiting those it identified as "habitual drunkards" from possessing alcohol. Judge Diana Gribbon Motz specially concurred, arguing that the majority was ignoring Powell v. Texas (1968). In July 2019, the full circuit en banc reversed the panel by a vote of 8–7, with Motz writing for the majority and Wilkinson now writing the principal dissent. The majority and concurring opinions criticized Wilkinson for incivility and "inflammatory language", which Wilkinson defended in an additional, special dissent.

On April 7, 2025, Wilkinson was one of three judges to order the federal government to return Kilmar Abrego Garcia, a man who was deported to El Salvador, back to the United States. On April 17, 2025, Wilkinson denied the government's request for an emergency stay pending appeal and for a writ of mandamus. He reasoned that unchecked executive power to deport individuals without due process could extend to U.S. citizens, citing President Donald Trump's remark that "homegrowns are next". Emphasizing judicial responsibility to preserve constitutional limits, Wilkinson invoked President Dwight D. Eisenhower's enforcement of Brown v. Board of Education II (1955) as a model for upholding rule of law, and cautioned that continued escalation of institutional conflict could lead to constitutional "crisis".

== Writings ==
Wilkinson has published numerous editorials, law review articles, and six books.

=== Books ===
- Harry Byrd and The Changing Face of Virginia Politics, 1945–1966. Charlottesville: University Press of Virginia. 1968..
- Serving Justice: A Supreme Court Clerk's View. New York: Charterhouse. 1974..
- From Brown to Bakke: The Supreme Court and School Integration, 1954–1978. New York: Oxford University Press. 1979. ISBN 0-19-502567-9..
- One Nation Indivisible: How Ethnic Separatism Threatens America. Reading, MA: Addison Wesley Longman. 1997. ISBN 0-201-18072-3..
- Cosmic Constitutional Theory: Why Americans Are Losing Their Inalienable Right to Self-Governance. New York: Oxford University Press. 2012. ISBN 978-0-19-984601-6..
- All Falling Faiths: Reflections on the Promise and Failure of the 1960s. Encounter Books. 2017. ISBN 978-1-59403-891-4. Encounter, 2017. ISBN 9781594038914

=== Selected articles ===
- Wilkinson, J. Harvie (1975). "The Supreme Court, the Equal Protection Clause, and the Three Faces of Constitutional Equality". Virginia Law Review. 61 (5): 945–1018. doi:10.2307/1072429. JSTOR 1072429.
- —; White, G. Edward (1977). "Constitutional Protection for Personal Lifestyles". Cornell Law Review. 62 (3): 563–626.
- — (1978). "The Supreme Court and Southern School Desegregation, 1955–1970: A History and Analysis". Virginia Law Review. 64 (4): 485–559. doi:10.2307/1072632. JSTOR 1072632.
- — (1989). "The Role of Reason in the Rule of Law". University of Chicago Law Review. 56 (2): 779–809. doi:10.2307/1599851. JSTOR 1599851.
- — (1994). "The Drawbacks of Growth in the Federal Judiciary". Emory Law Journal. 43 (4): 1147–88.
- — (2002). "Is There a Distinctive Conservative Jurisprudence?". University of Colorado Law Review. 73 (4): 1383–1400.
- — (2004). "Our Structural Constitution". Columbia Law Review. 104 (6): 1687–1709. doi:10.2307/4099380. JSTOR 4099380.
- — (2009). "Of Guns, Abortions, and the Unraveling Rule of Law". Virginia Law Review. 95 (2): 253–323. JSTOR 25478705.
- — (2014). "In Defense of American Criminal Justice". Vanderbilt Law Review. 67 (4): 1099–1172.

== Honors and awards ==
In 2004, the University of Virginia awarded Wilkinson the Thomas Jefferson Foundation Medal in Law, its highest external honor.

In 2009, the Lawrenceville School awarded Wilkinson its highest honor.

In 2016, the John Barbee Minor Inn of Court in Charlottesville recognized Wilkinson's three decades of judicial service with a Certificate of Merit and Lifetime Achievement Award.

== See also ==
- List of law clerks for the first seat of the Supreme Court of the United States
- List of United States federal judges by longevity of service

Legal offices
Preceded by John D. Butzner Jr.	Judge of the United States Court of Appeals for the Fourth Circuit; 1984–present	Incumbent
Preceded by Samuel James Ervin III	Chief Judge of the United States Court of Appeals for the Fourth Circuit; 1996–2003	Succeeded by William Walter Wilkins
