= Deborah K. Chasanow =

American judge (born 1948)

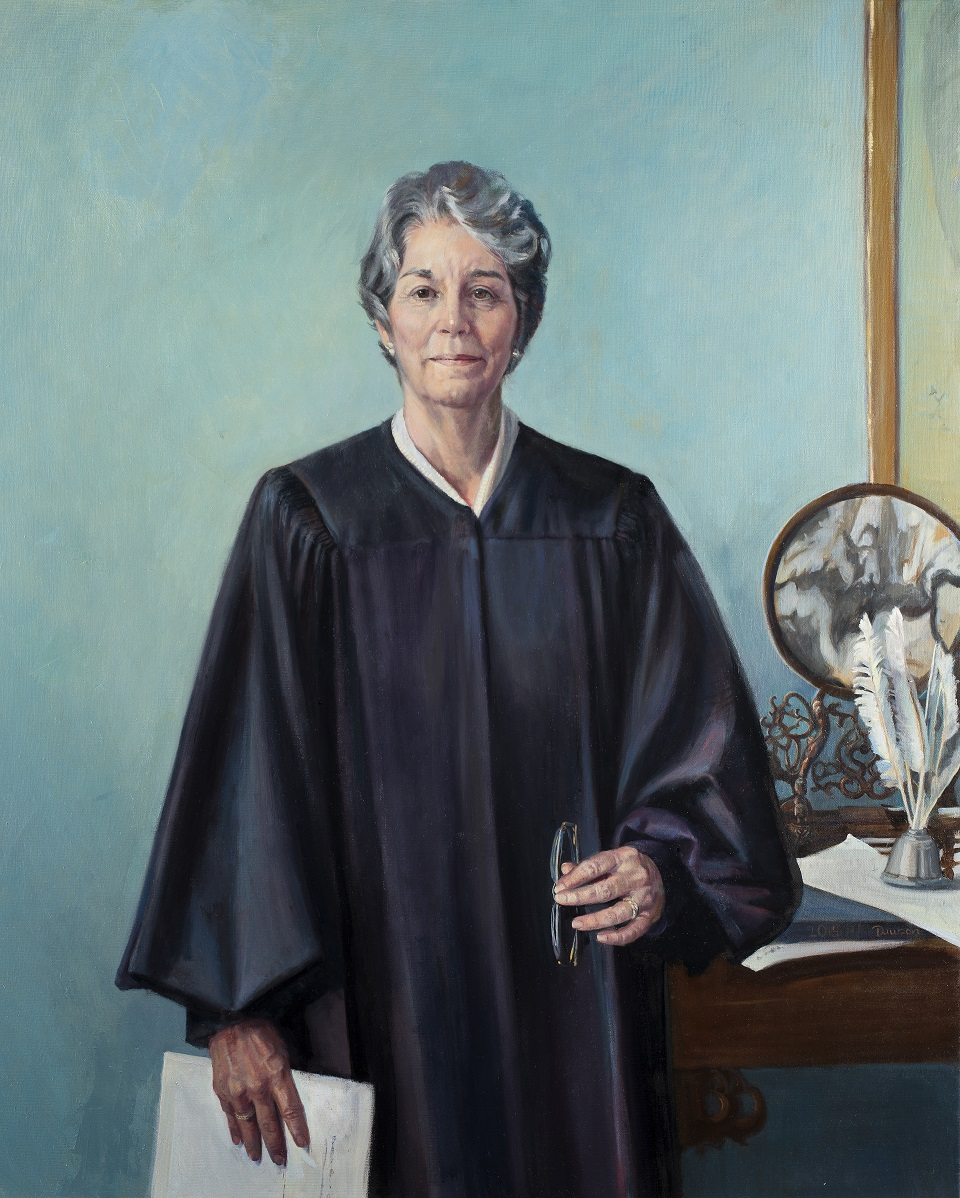

Senior Judge of the United States District Court for the District of Maryland
- Incumbent
- Assumed office October 3, 2014

Chief Judge of the United States District Court for the District of Maryland
- In office 2010 – October 3, 2014
- Preceded by: Benson Everett Legg
- Succeeded by: Catherine C. Blake

Judge of the United States District Court for the District of Maryland
- In office October 20, 1993 – October 3, 2014
- Appointed by: Bill Clinton
- Preceded by: Alexander Harvey II
- Succeeded by: Paula Xinis

Magistrate Judge of the United States District Court for the District of Maryland
- In office 1987–1993

Personal details
- Born: Deborah Havis Koss; April 23, 1948 (age 77) Washington, D.C., U.S.
- Education: Rutgers University (BA); Stanford Law School (JD)

Deborah Havis Koss Chasanow (born April 23, 1948) is a senior United States district judge of the United States District Court for the District of Maryland.

== Biography ==
Born in Washington, D.C., Chasanow received a Bachelor of Arts degree from Rutgers University in 1970 and a Juris Doctor from Stanford Law School in 1974. She was a law clerk for David L. Cahoon, Montgomery County Circuit Court, Maryland from 1974 to 1975, and was in private practice in Washington, D.C. in 1975. She was an Assistant state attorney general in the Office of the Maryland Attorney General from 1975 to 1987, and was chief of the Criminal Appeals Division from 1979 to 1987. She was a United States magistrate judge for the United States District Court for the District of Maryland from 1987 to 1993.

== Federal judicial service ==
On August 6, 1993, Chasanow was nominated by President Bill Clinton to a seat on the United States District Court for the District of Maryland vacated by Alexander Harvey II. She was confirmed by the United States Senate on October 18, 1993, and received her commission on October 20, 1993. She became chief judge in 2010, serving in that capacity until she assumed senior status on October 3, 2014.

In November 2015, Chasanow found that the Bladensburg Peace Cross war memorial did not violate the Constitution's Establishment Clause. Her judgment was reversed by the divided Fourth Circuit, which was ultimately itself reversed by the Supreme Court in American Legion v. American Humanist Association (2019).

== Personal life ==
Chasanow was married to Maryland state court judge Howard S. Chasanow until his death in 2017.

== See also ==
- List of Jewish American jurists

Legal offices
Preceded by Alexander Harvey II	Judge of the United States District Court for the District of Maryland; 1993–2014	Succeeded by Paula Xinis
Preceded by Benson Everett Legg	Chief Judge of the United States District Court for the District of Maryland; 2010–2014	Succeeded by Catherine C. Blake
