= Judge Winter =

Judge Winter may refer to:

- Ralph K. Winter Jr. (1935–2020), judge of the United States Court of Appeals for the Second Circuit
- Harrison Lee Winter (1921–1990), judge of the United States Court of Appeals for the Fourth Circuit
