= Judge Motz =

Judge Motz may refer to:

- Diana Gribbon Motz (born 1943), judge of the United States Court of Appeals for the Fourth Circuit
- J. Frederick Motz (1942–2023), judge of the United States District Court for the District of Maryland
