= Frederic N. Smalkin =

American judge

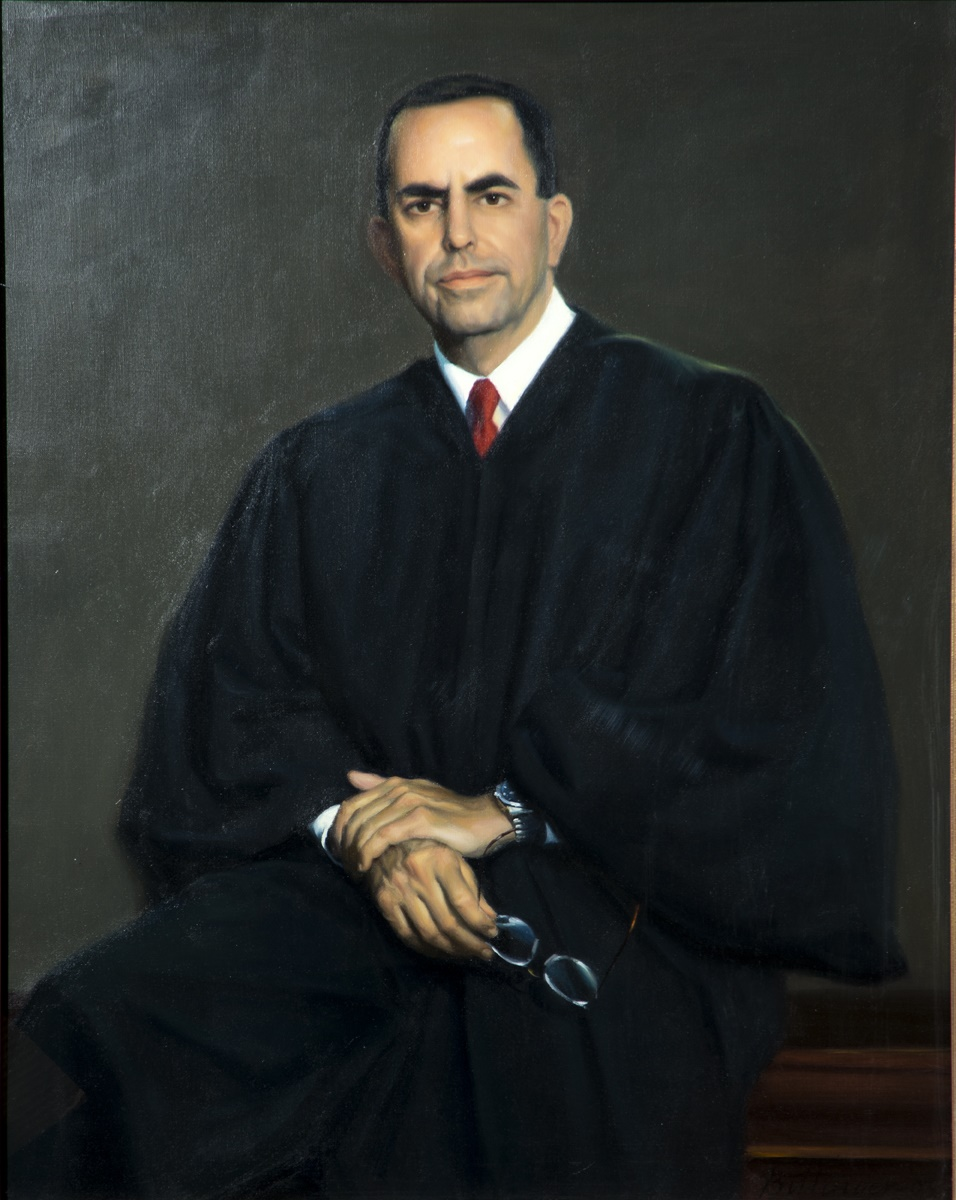

Senior Judge of the United States District Court for the District of Maryland
- In office January 8, 2003 – September 1, 2011

Chief Judge of the United States District Court for the District of Maryland
- In office 2001–2003
- Preceded by: J. Frederick Motz
- Succeeded by: Benson Everett Legg

Judge of the United States District Court for the District of Maryland
- In office September 26, 1986 – January 8, 2003
- Appointed by: Ronald Reagan
- Preceded by: James Rogers Miller Jr.
- Succeeded by: Richard D. Bennett

Magistrate Judge of the United States District Court for the District of Maryland
- In office 1976–1986

Personal details
- Born: May 21, 1946 (age 80) Baltimore, Maryland, U.S.
- Education: Johns Hopkins University (BA); University of London (LLM); University of Maryland (JD)

Frederic N. Smalkin (born May 21, 1946) is a retired United States district judge of the United States District Court for the District of Maryland and is currently a professor at the University of Baltimore School of Law, where he was awarded the James A. May award for excellence in teaching and mentoring.

Smalkin currently serves as the chair of the Maryland Environmental Service Board of Directors. He also has served as chairman of the Maryland Governor's Emergency Management Advisory Council and the Maryland Commission on Law Enforcement Body-Worn Cameras. He has served in the grade of brigadier general in, and has been the commanding general of, the Maryland Defense Force, as well as having served as a lieutenant colonel in the Civil Air Patrol, the U.S. Air Force Auxiliary. He was also a captain in the Regular United States Army.

== Early life and education ==
Smalkin was born in Baltimore, Maryland. His father was an attorney in Baltimore County, serving as President of the local Bar Association and as one of the first Judges of the People's Court for Baltimore County, before his death in 1958. Smalkin graduated from McDonogh School and received a Bachelor of Arts degree from The Johns Hopkins University, Phi Beta Kappa. He graduated from the University of Maryland School of Law, earning his Juris Doctor and was made a member of the Order of the Coif, having graduated first of his class.

== Military service ==
Smalkin went to college and law school on a set of Army ROTC scholarships. He served as an officer in the United States Army (Regular Army) from 1968 until his honorable discharge, in 1976, earning the Meritorious Service Medal with an Oak Leaf Cluster and achieving the rank of captain. Smalkin served in the Ordnance Corps with a detail to the Judge Advocate General's Corps, first in the Office of the Judge Advocate General and later as Assistant to the General Counsel of the Army, when he was appointed Recorder of the Army Contract Adjustment Board. He later became a rated pilot and Lieutenant Colonel in the Civil Air Patrol and was awarded its Distinguished Service Medal. He was commissioned in the Maryland Military Department and later promoted to Brigadier General and appointed by the Governor as commander of the Maryland Defense Force (State Guard). Upon relinquishing command of the Defense Force, he was awarded the State of Maryland Distinguished Service Cross.

== Professional career ==
Smalkin began his career in public service as law clerk to then Chief Judge Edward Skottowe Northrop of the United States District Court for the District of Maryland. He was subsequently admitted to the Maryland Bar, having reportedly achieved that year's highest score on the Maryland bar exam. He practiced law in Monkton, Maryland briefly in 1976, before entering Federal judicial service. He has been a lecturer at the University of Maryland Law School in Baltimore since 1978.

== Federal judicial service ==
Smalkin served as a United States magistrate judge in the District of Maryland from 1976 to 1986. He was nominated by President Ronald Reagan on August 15, 1986, to a seat on the United States District Court for the District of Maryland vacated by Judge James Rogers Miller Jr. He was confirmed by the United States Senate on September 25, 1986, and received commission on September 26, 1986. He served as Chief Judge from October 20, 2001 to January 6, 2003 due to a certified disability. He assumed senior status on January 8, 2003. He fully retired on September 1, 2011.

== Post-retirement ==
Smalkin is now a mediator and arbitrator with the dispute resolution firm JAMS (alternative dispute resolution), still active as of March 2018.

== Notable cases ==
Two controversial cases stand out from the many that Judge Smalkin heard during his thirty years on the bench. First was his 1987 decision which overturned the conviction of Marvin Mandel, who succeeded Spiro Agnew as Governor of Maryland, for mail fraud and racketeering. Smalkin applied a Supreme Court decision—handed down after Mandel's conviction—which held that the mail fraud statute under which Mandel was convicted did not apply to cases of government corruption. United States v. Mandel, 672 F.Supp. 864 (D.Md. 1987).

The second, and perhaps more notorious, case was Sons of Confederate Veterans, Inc. v. Glendening, in which Judge Smalkin held that the Maryland Department of Motor Vehicles could not deny the local Sons of Confederate Veterans a "vanity" license plate bearing a confederate flag, because to do so would infringe their right to free speech, in violation of the First Amendment. Sons of Confederate Veterans v. Glendening, 954 F.Supp. 1099 (D.Md. 1997). In a later case (in 2015), the Supreme Court decided that the purchasers of license plates cannot assert free speech rights with regard to their content.

== Academic and professional associations ==
- Honorary Member, Federal Bar Association
- American Law Institute
- Faculty member, The Johns Hopkins Medical School Core Faculty (Foundations of Public Health)
- Former Faculty member, Trial Advocacy Institute, University of Virginia
- Jurist-in-Residence and Instructor (Business Organizations, Commercial Law, Evidence, Sales & Leases, Trusts & Estates, English Legal History, American Legal History, Advanced Trial Advocacy), University of Baltimore School of Law, 2005–present
- Member, Maritime Law Association (U.S.)
- LL.M. in Maritime Law, University of London
- Member, Chartered Institute of Arbitrators (U.K.)
- Government Relations and Federal Affairs Committee Member, State Guard Association of the United States

Legal offices
Preceded by James Rogers Miller Jr.	Judge of the United States District Court for the District of Maryland; 1986–2003	Succeeded by Richard D. Bennett
Preceded by J. Frederick Motz	Chief Judge of the United States District Court for the District of Maryland; 2001–2003	Succeeded by Benson Everett Legg
