= 1994 Maryland Attorney General election =

- November 8, 1994
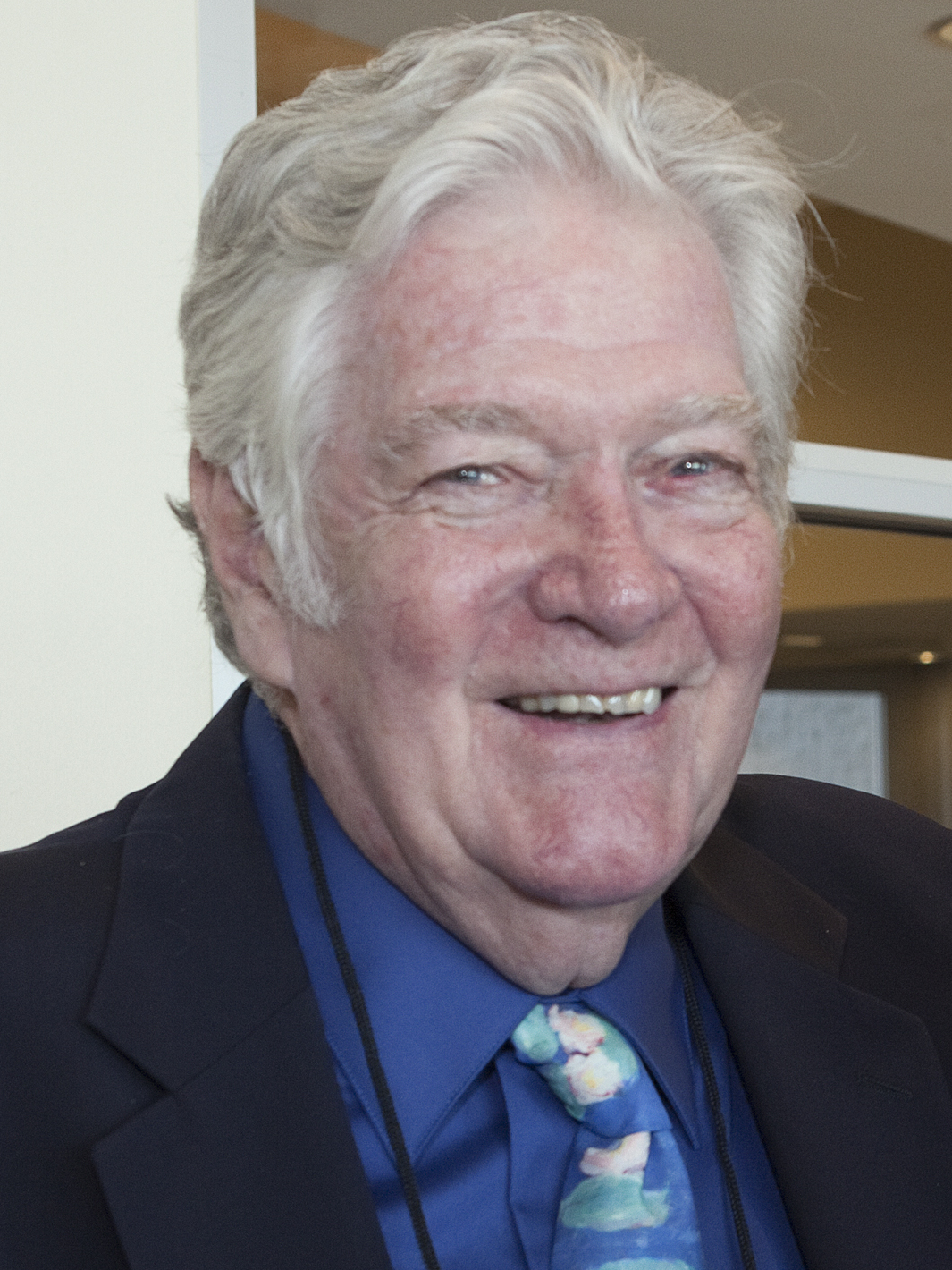

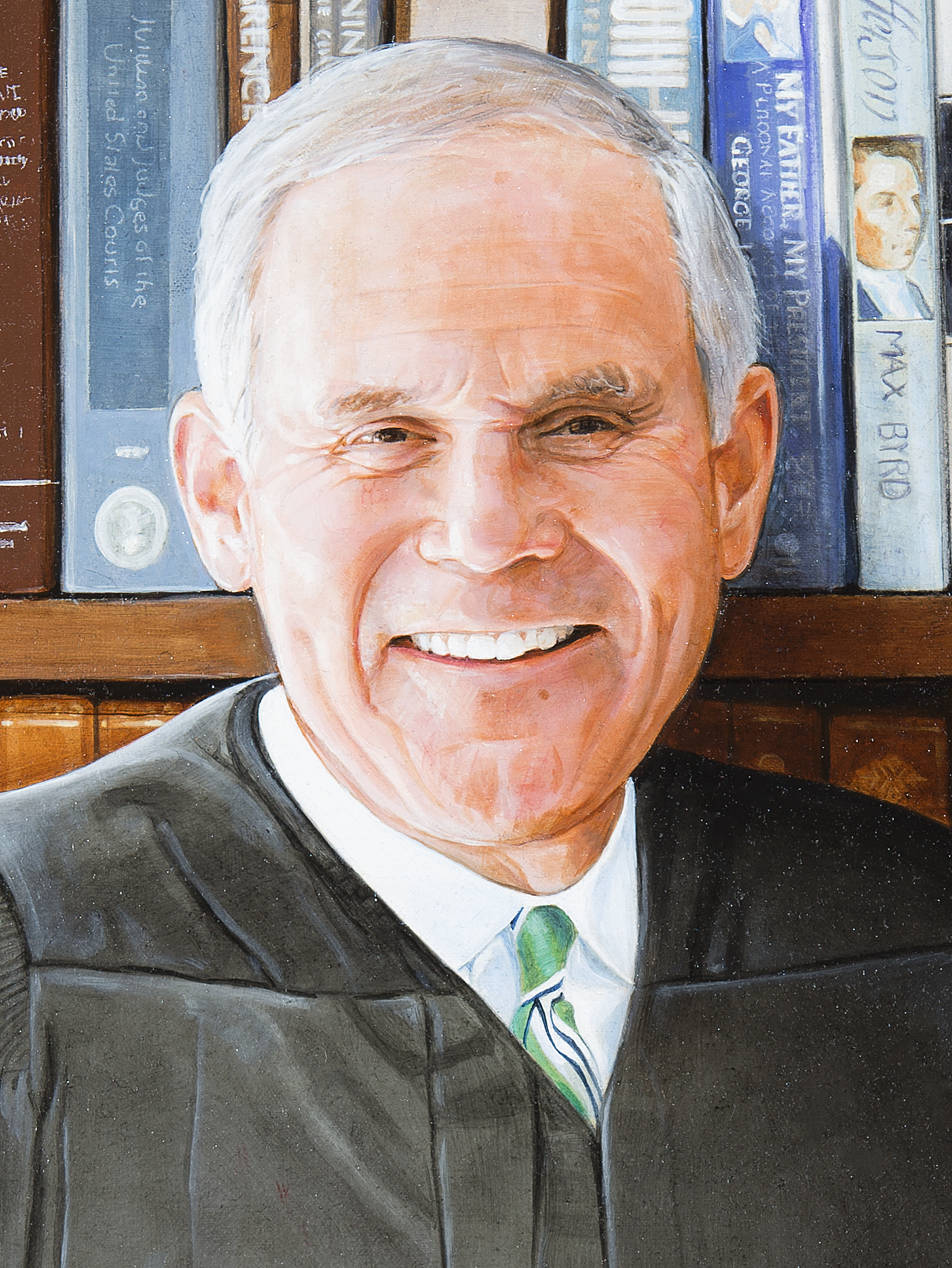
Nominee	J. Joseph Curran Jr.	Richard D. Bennett
Party	Democratic	Republican
Popular vote	703,169	608,522
Percentage	53.61%	46.39%
- County results Curran: 50–60% 60–70% 70–80% Bennett: 50–60% 60–70%
Attorney General before election
J. Joseph Curran Jr.
Democratic
Elected Attorney General
J. Joseph Curran Jr.
Democratic

The 1994 Maryland attorney general election was held on November 8, 1994, in order to elect the attorney general of Maryland. Democratic nominee and incumbent attorney general J. Joseph Curran Jr. defeated Republican nominee Richard D. Bennett.

== General election ==
On election day, November 8, 1994, Democratic nominee J. Joseph Curran Jr. won re-election by a margin of 94,647 votes against his opponent Republican nominee Richard D. Bennett, thereby retaining Democratic control over the office of attorney general. Curran was sworn in for his third term on January 3, 1995.

=== Results ===
Maryland Attorney General election, 1994
Party	Candidate	Votes	%
Democratic	J. Joseph Curran Jr. (incumbent)	703,169	53.61
Republican	Richard D. Bennett	608,522	46.39
Total votes		1,311,691	100.00
Democratic hold			
