= American Legion v. American Humanist Association =

- Supreme Court of the United States

Argued February 27, 2019 Decided June 20, 2019
- Full case name: The American Legion, et al. v. American Humanist Association, et al.
- Docket no.: 17-1717
- Citations: 588 U.S. 29 (more) 139 S. Ct. 2067; 204 L. Ed. 2d 452
- Argument: Oral argument

Case history
- Prior: Am. Humanist Ass'n v. Maryland-Nat. Capital Park, 147 F. Supp. 3d 373 (D. Md. 2015); reversed, American Humanist v. MD-Nat'l Capital Park, 874 F.3d 195 (4th Cir. 2017); rehearing en banc denied, 891 F.3d 117 (4th Cir. 2018); cert. granted, 139 S. Ct. 451 (2018).

Questions presented
- Whether a 93-year-old memorial to the fallen of World War I is unconstitutional merely because it is shaped like a cross, whether the constitutionality of a passive display incorporating religious symbolism should be assessed under prior case law tests, and whether the expenditure of funds for routine upkeep and maintenance of a cross-shaped war memorial, without more, amounts to an excessive entanglement with religion in violation of the First Amendment

Holding
- Though a symbol of Christianity, the cross on public land does not violate the establishment clause of the First Amendment due to its historical value as a war memorial that has stood for nearly 100 years.

Court membership
- Chief Justice John Roberts Associate Justices Clarence Thomas · Ruth Bader Ginsburg; Stephen Breyer · Samuel Alito; Sonia Sotomayor · Elena Kagan; Neil Gorsuch · Brett Kavanaugh

Case opinions
- Majority: Alito (Parts I, II–B, II–C, III, and IV), joined by Roberts, Breyer, Kagan, and Kavanaugh
- Plurality: Alito (Parts II–A and II–D), joined by Roberts, Breyer, and Kavanaugh
- Concurrence: Breyer, joined by Kagan
- Concurrence: Kavanaugh
- Concurrence: Kagan (in part)
- Concurrence: Thomas (in judgment)
- Concurrence: Gorsuch (in judgment), joined by Thomas
- Dissent: Ginsburg, joined by Sotomayor

American Legion v. American Humanist Association, 588 U.S. 29 (2019), was a United States Supreme Court case dealing with the separation of church and state related to maintaining the Peace Cross, a World War I memorial shaped after a Latin cross, on government-owned land, though initially built in 1925 with private funds on private lands. The case was a consolidation of two petitions to the court, that of The American Legion who built the cross (Docket 17–1717), and of the Maryland-National Capital Park and Planning Commission who own the land and maintain the memorial (Docket 18-18). Both petitions challenged the Fourth Circuit's ruling that, regardless of the secular purpose the cross was built for in honoring the deceased soldiers, the cross emboldened a religious symbol, and had ordered it altered or razed. The Supreme Court reversed the Fourth Circuit's ruling in a 7–2 decision, determining that since the Cross had stood for decades without controversy, it did not violate the Establishment Clause and could remain standing.

== Background ==
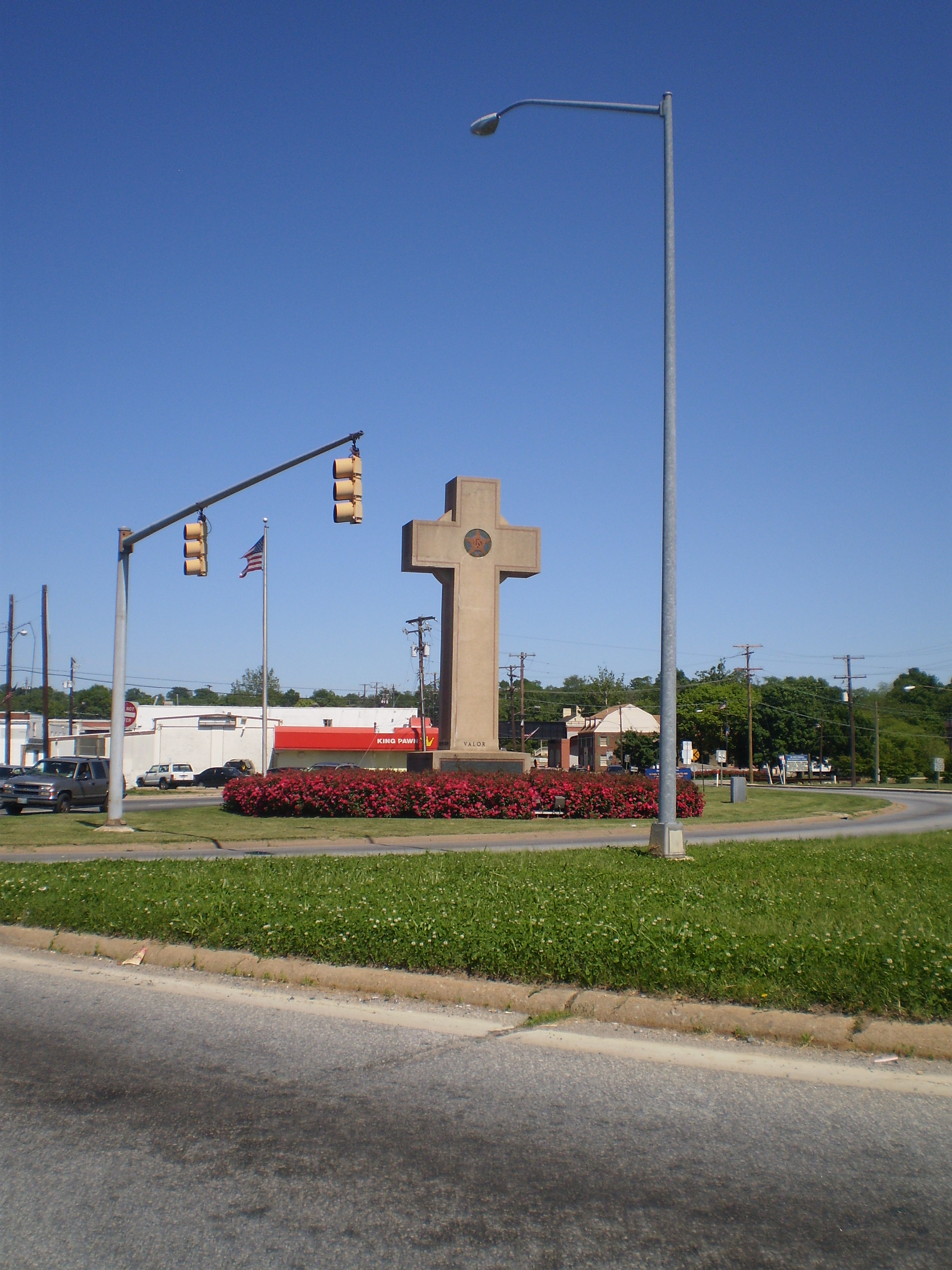
The Peace Cross

The 40 feet (12 m)-tall Peace Cross was constructed in Bladensburg, Maryland by the American Legion with private funding in 1925 to honor the local servicemen that died during World War I. The creators opted for the cross shape to mirror the gravemarkers that were left in the war theaters to commemorate the dead buried there. At the time it was built, the monument was on private land, but the land was donated in 1961 to the Maryland-National Capital Park and Planning Commission, a bi-county agency in Maryland, making it park land owned by the state. The Commission provided illumination for the monument at night, and allowed the Cross to be used as a central point for Memorial Day and Veterans Day observances. Additional war memorials were built on nearby lands, creating the local Veterans Memorial Park.

Around 2012, local residents recognized that the placement of the Cross on state lands and the commission's continued care for it with taxpayer funds may be against the principle of the separation of church and state. A formal lawsuit was filed by the American Humanist Association, an atheist advocacy group, that argued that the Peace Cross violated the Establishment Clause of the Constitution. The case was heard by Judge Deborah Chasanow of the United States District Court for the District of Maryland, which granted summary judgement for the commission.

The American Humanist Association appealed to the United States Court of Appeals for the Fourth Circuit. In October 2017, a divided panel of the Fourth Circuit reversed the district court, with Judge Stephanie Thacker's opinion joined by Judge James A. Wynn Jr. Chief Judge Roger Gregory dissented. The majority found that despite the commission's argument on the monument's secular nature, the symbol of the cross had been considered a religious icon for centuries, and thus they considered that its installation and maintenance on public lands violated the Establishment Clause. Further, the majority held that the commission's continued maintenance of the memorial contributed to entangling the state with a religious figure, further violating the Establishment Clause, even though the Commissions argued this was for purposes of motorist safety. The Fourth Circuit concluded that the commission's maintenance of the Peace Cross has "a primary effect of endorsing religion and excessively entangles the government and religion".

In March 2018, the full circuit denied petitions for rehearing en banc by a vote of 8–6, with Wynn authoring a concurrence. Gregory, who dissented again, feared that the ruling could affect thousands of cross-shaped memorials on public lands even though they were built under similar secular purposes as the Peace Cross. With the refusal, the Fourth Circuit subsequently ordered the Peace Cross to be altered so that it no longer resembled a cross, or to be razed. Judges Paul V. Niemeyer and J. Harvie Wilkinson III also wrote dissents.

== Supreme Court ==
Both the Planning Commission and the American Legion petitioned for writs of certiorari from the Supreme Court, asking it to review the Fourth Circuit's decision. Both petitions were granted and consolidated to a single case. Questions asked included whether a memorial having the shape of a cross placed on public lands should be considered a violation of the Establishment Clause, or under what past tests they should be considered, and whether maintaining such memorials for other interests of the state, such as road safety, creates entanglement under the Establishment Clause. Among those supporting the Commission and American Legion included numerous veterans groups, the Trump Administration, and several Congresspersons. The Court accepted the case in November 2018.

The issue of cross-shaped memorials on public lands had been previously heard in Salazar v. Buono in 2010; while the 5–4 majority ruled that the cross could stay, the rationale was heavily divided by the justices, with a total of six different opinions submitted as part of the case. This had made it difficult to use Salazar as case law for other related cases, such as this one.

On February 27, 2019, the Supreme Court heard oral arguments, including appearances from Neal Katyal for the state petitioner and acting Solicitor General Jeffery Wall for the Federal Government as a friend of the petitioners, and Monica Miller for the respondents. Observers to the court believed the justices were in majority to support reversing the Fourth Circuit, believing that the memorial as built had secular purposes reflecting the way soldiers were memorialized at the time. However, how to qualify this under past case law was left as a question, and that if new memorials carrying the cross shape were installed today, they may not be acceptable under the Establishment Clause.

=== Opinion of the Court ===
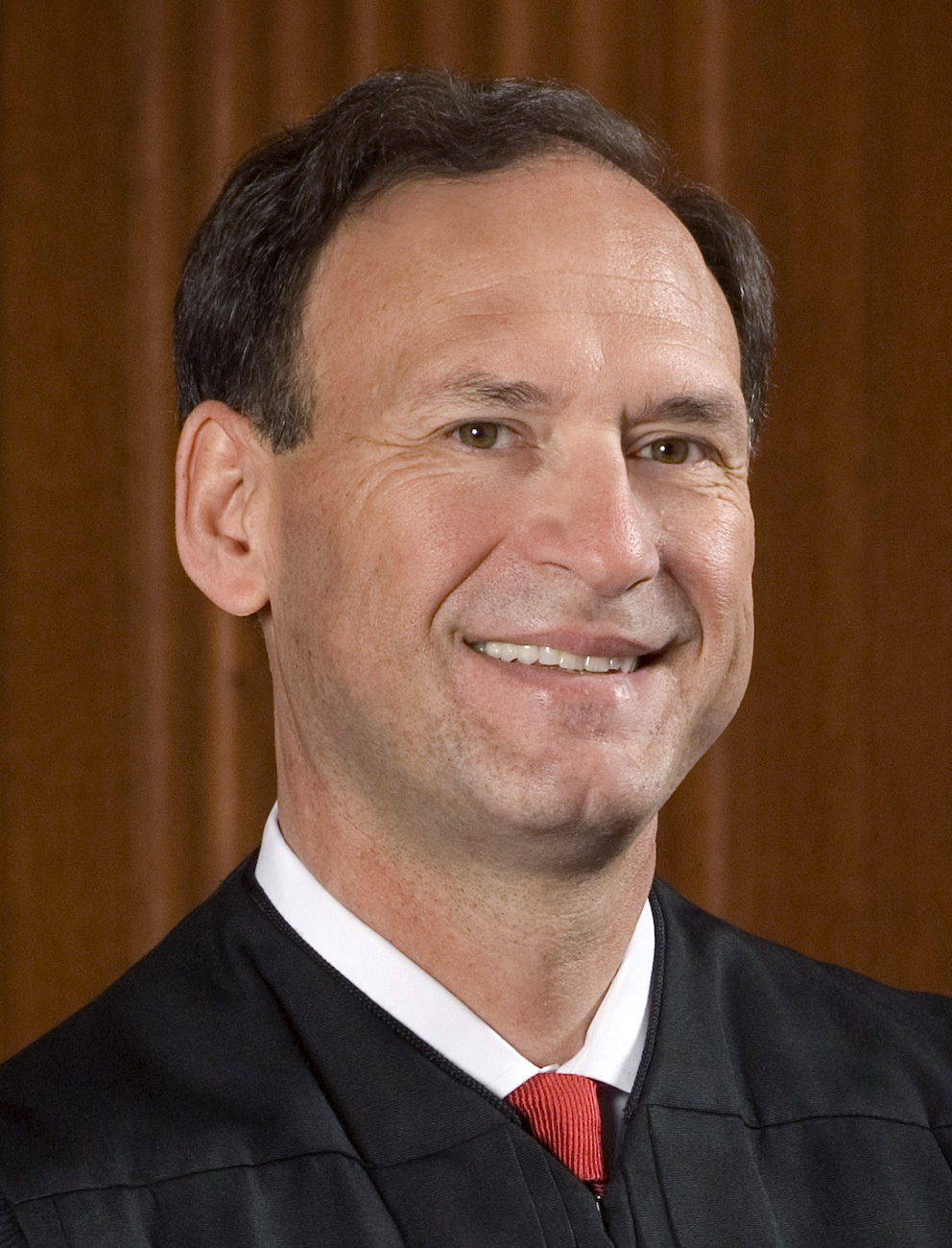
Justice Samuel Alito wrote for the majority and for the plurality

On June 20, 2019, the Supreme Court announced judgment in favor of the American Legion, reversing the lower court by a vote of 7–2. Justice Samuel Alito, joined by Chief Justice John Roberts, Justice Stephen Breyer, Justice Brett Kavanaugh, and partially by Justice Elena Kagan, wrote for the Court and, in some sections, for a mere plurality.

The Court declared that it generally does not apply the test from Lemon v. Kurtzman to longstanding monuments for four reasons. First, the passage of time makes it difficult to identify a monument's original purpose. Second, multiple overlapping purposes may emerge as time goes by. Third, the primary effect of a monument may change as it becomes embedded in a community's sense of place. And fourth, court-ordered removal of a longstanding monument may create the appearance of a government "aggressively hostile to religion."

Applying these principles, the Court held that the humanists could not overcome the strong presumption of constitutionality the passage of time had given to the Peace Cross. Historically, the Court found that the World War I context contributed "added secular meaning" to the cross; quoting as support In Flanders Fields' poetic allusion to rows of crosses, and noting that the Army Distinguished Service Cross and Navy Cross were both established in the immediate aftermath of the war. Furthermore, the Court recognized that many of the bereaved local parents would never be able to visit the foreign gravesites of their war dead sons. Overlapping purposes for the cross, thus, evolved through time as first a place of grieving, then of remembrance, and, now, as a busy intersection. Likewise, the Court credited the planning commission's argument that the modern effects of the cross include historic preservation and improved traffic safety. Finally, the Court found that ordering destruction of the cross would not be perceived as a religiously neutral act and viewed the Fourth Circuit's suggested remedy of "amputating the arms of the Cross" as "profoundly disrespectful."

Alito stated that "The cross is undoubtedly a Christian symbol, but that fact should not blind us to everything else that the Bladensburg Cross has come to represent", and that "destroying or defacing the Cross that has stood undisturbed for nearly a century would not be neutral and would not further the ideals of respect and tolerance embodied in the First Amendment".

==== Plurality sections ====
Justice Alito continued, in a four-justice plurality opinion that Justice Kagan did not join, to expressly disapprove of Lemon for, he argued, its failed attempt to create a "grand unified theory of the Establishment Clause". Alito went on to praise the Court's "more modest approach" in earlier legislative prayer cases, such as Town of Greece v. Galloway (2014).

==== Concurrences ====
Justice Breyer, joined by Kagan, concurred. Breyer quoted his earlier opinion in Van Orden v. Perry (2005) to explain where here, again, a longstanding monument does not pose a real threat to secular tolerance. Breyer, however, rejected arguments advanced by Justices Kavanaugh and Gorsuch that history and tradition create license to erect new monuments in the old style.

Justice Kavanaugh also concurred. Kavanaugh praised the Court for rejecting the Lemon test as it should, he argued, in all cases. Instead, Kavanaugh posited that any government practice rooted in history and tradition that is not coercive should not violate the Establishment Clause.

Justice Kagan concurred in part. Kagan agreed that the Lemon test is not always useful, but she rejected the plurality's general disapproval of that precedent. Likewise, in "perhaps an abundance of caution" Kagan did not join in the plurality's reliance upon history, instead arguing that cases are best decided case-by-case.

===== Concurrence in the judgment =====
Thomas and Gorsuch voted for the majority's judgment but did not join Alito's opinion.

Thomas, alone, asserted that the Establishment Clause has not been incorporated and so does not apply to the states. Regardless, Thomas believed that sectarian religious displays on public property do not violate the clause anyway.

Gorsuch, joined by Thomas, argued the humanists had no standing to sue under the Case or Controversy Clause because they are merely an "offended observer". Regardless, Gorsuch praised the plurality for rejecting the Lemon test.

==== Dissent ====
Justice Ruth Bader Ginsburg wrote the dissenting opinion, joined by Justice Sonia Sotomayor. Ginsburg read aloud her dissent on the bench at the opinion announcement. According to Ginsburg, all crosses displayed on public property are presumptively unconstitutional endorsements of Christianity. This presumption may be overcome in some contexts, she offered, such as in a museum display or in a history class. Ginsburg argued that crosses remained unconstitutional in the World War I context by noting that the mass-produced Spirit of the American Doughboy statue was far more common and that the National Jewish Welfare Board had successfully objected to the inclusion of a cross on the Tomb of the Unknown Soldier. In Ginsburg's view, the Peace Cross unconstitutionally "elevates Christianity over other faiths, and religion over non religion." An article published on PBS NewsHour noted this dissent as one of five of Ruth Bader Ginsburg's most powerful Supreme Court opinions.
