= Benson Everett Legg =

American judge (born 1947)

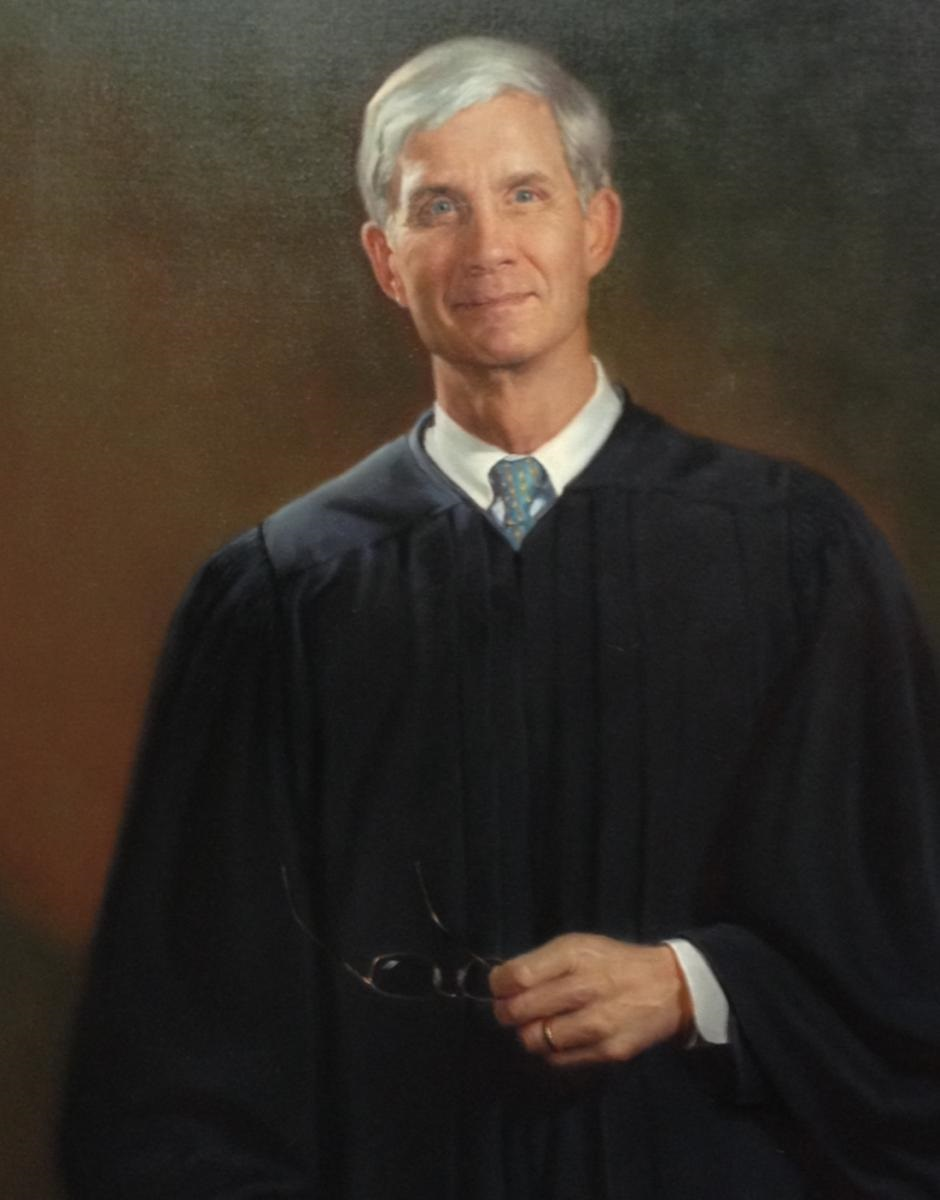

Senior Judge of the United States District Court for the District of Maryland
- In office June 8, 2012 – February 6, 2013

Chief Judge of the United States District Court for the District of Maryland
- In office January 6, 2003 – January 4, 2010
- Preceded by: Frederic N. Smalkin
- Succeeded by: Deborah K. Chasanow

Judge of the United States District Court for the District of Maryland
- In office September 16, 1991 – June 8, 2012
- Appointed by: George H. W. Bush
- Preceded by: Paul V. Niemeyer
- Succeeded by: Paul W. Grimm

Personal details
- Born: Benson Everett Legg; June 8, 1947 (age 78) Baltimore, Maryland
- Education: Princeton University (AB); University of Virginia School of Law (JD)

Benson Everett Legg (born June 8, 1947) is a former United States district judge of the United States District Court for the District of Maryland.

== Education and career ==
Legg was born in Baltimore, Maryland. After receiving his education at the preparatory school Gilman School in Baltimore, graduating in the class of 1966, he earned an Artium Baccalaureus degree from Princeton University in 1970. He went on to obtain a Juris Doctor from the University of Virginia School of Law in 1973 and was admitted to the Maryland bar the same year. From 1973 to 1974, Legg was a law clerk to Judge Frank Albert Kaufman of the United States District Court for the District of Maryland and then practiced law privately in Baltimore from 1975 to 1991.

== Federal judicial service ==
On May 15, 1991, he was nominated by President George H. W. Bush to fill a seat on the United States District Court for the District of Maryland vacated by Judge Paul V. Niemeyer. He was confirmed by the United States Senate on September 12, 1991, and received his commission on September 16, 1991. He served as Chief Judge from January 6, 2003 to January 4, 2010. He assumed senior status on June 8, 2012. He retired from active service on February 6, 2013.

== Sources ==
- "Benson Everett Legg". msa.md.gov: Maryland State Archives. 23 April 2010.

Legal offices
Preceded by Paul V. Niemeyer	Judge of the United States District Court for the District of Maryland; 1991–2012	Succeeded by Paul W. Grimm
Preceded by Frederic N. Smalkin	Chief Judge of the United States District Court for the District of Maryland; 2003–2010	Succeeded by Deborah K. Chasanow
