= Paula Xinis =

American federal judge (born 1968)

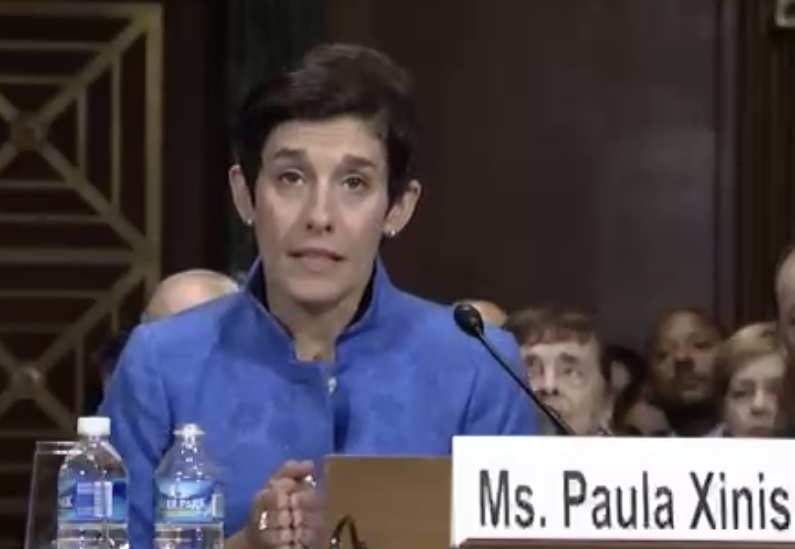
- Xinis testifying to the United States Senate Committee on the Judiciary during her nomination hearing in 2015

Judge of the United States District Court for the District of Maryland
- Incumbent
- Assumed office May 18, 2016
- Appointed by: Barack Obama
- Preceded by: Deborah K. Chasanow

Personal details
- Born: Panagiota Xinis; 1968 (age 57–58) Mineola, New York, U.S.
- Education: University of Virginia (BA); Yale University (JD)

Paula Xinis (/ɛkˈsiːnəs/; born Panagiota Xinis in 1968) is an American lawyer and jurist serving as a United States district judge of the U.S. District Court for the District of Maryland. She was appointed in 2016 by President Barack Obama. She is best known for her role as judge in the deportation case of Kilmar Abrego Garcia, receiving national and worldwide attention.

== Biography ==
Xinis is of Greek ancestry. She received a Bachelor of Arts degree, summa cum laude, in 1991 from the University of Virginia. She received a Juris Doctor in 1997 from Yale Law School. She began her legal career as a law clerk for Judge Diana Gribbon Motz of the United States Court of Appeals for the Fourth Circuit, from 1997 to 1998. From 1998 to 2011, she served as an assistant federal public defender, serving as director of Training for the office from 2006 to 2011. She served at the law firm of Murphy, Falcon & Murphy in Baltimore, Maryland, as a senior trial attorney from 2011 and as a partner from 2013 to 2016. She practiced both civil and criminal litigation.

=== Federal judicial service ===
On March 26, 2015, President Barack Obama nominated Xinis to serve as a United States district judge of the United States District Court for the District of Maryland, to the seat vacated by Judge Deborah K. Chasanow, who assumed senior status on October 3, 2014. Her nomination was reported from the Senate Judiciary Committee on September 17, 2015, by a voice vote. On May 16, 2016, the Senate confirmed her nomination by a 53–34 vote. She received her judicial commission on May 18, 2016.

==== Notable rulings ====
In Abrego Garcia v. Noem, No. 25-cv-951 (Apr. 4, 2025), after the United States government described Kilmar Abrego Garcia's deportation as being due to an "administrative error", Judge Xinis ordered the government to "facilitate" and "effectuate" Garcia's return to the United States. Parts of this ruling were later affirmed by the Supreme Court of the United States, though it stopped short of requiring the government to "effectuate" Garcia's return. He was returned on June 6, 2025, but held in custody pending other removal efforts by the government, with a brief release in August, until December 11, 2025, when Xinis granted Garcia's habeas petition to release him from custody, and he was released.

== See also ==
- James Boasberg, the Federal judge in the concurrent deportation case of Venezuelan nationals.

Legal offices
Preceded by Deborah K. Chasanow	Judge of the United States District Court for the District of Maryland; 2016–present	Incumbent
