= James Rogers Miller Jr. =

American judge (1931–2014)

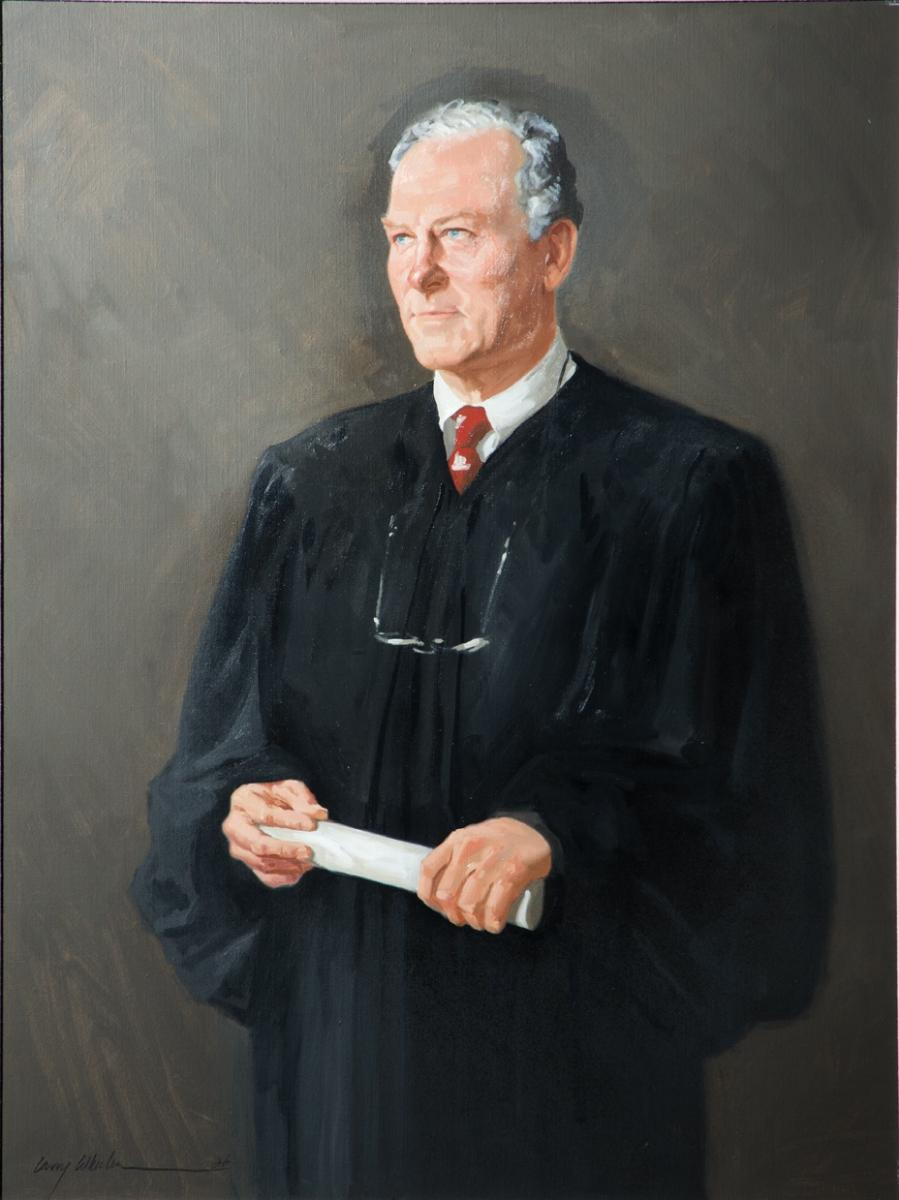

Judge of the United States District Court for the District of Maryland
- In office October 15, 1970 – December 1, 1986
- Appointed by: Richard Nixon
- Preceded by: Seat established by 84 Stat. 294
- Succeeded by: Frederic N. Smalkin

Member of the Maryland House of Delegates
- In office 1963–1967

Personal details
- Born: James Rogers Miller Jr. June 15, 1931 Sandy Spring, Maryland
- Died: June 25, 2014 (aged 83) Easton, Maryland
- Party: Republican
- Education: Wesleyan University (B.A.); Georgetown University Law Center (LL.B.)

James Rogers Miller Jr. (June 15, 1931 – June 25, 2014) was a United States district judge of the United States District Court for the District of Maryland.

== Education and career ==
Born in Sandy Spring, Maryland, Miller received a Bachelor of Arts degree from Wesleyan University in 1953 and a Bachelor of Laws from Georgetown University Law Center in 1955. He was in private practice in Rockville, Maryland from 1955 to 1970. He was a member of the Maryland House of Delegates from 1963 to 1967 and a member of the Republican Party.

== Federal judicial service ==
On September 28, 1970, Miller was nominated by President Richard Nixon to a new seat on the United States District Court for the District of Maryland created by 84 Stat. 294. He was confirmed by the United States Senate on October 13, 1970, and received his commission on October 15, 1970. Miller served in that capacity until his resignation on December 1, 1986.

== Post judicial career and death ==
After his resignation from the federal bench, Miller returned to the private practice of law, including service as an arbitrator and mediator. Miller died of congestive heart failure on June 25, 2014, in Easton, Maryland.

== Sources ==
Legal offices
Preceded by Seat established by 84 Stat. 294	Judge of the United States District Court for the District of Maryland; 1970–1986	Succeeded by Frederic N. Smalkin
