= J. Frederick Motz =

American judge (1942–2023)

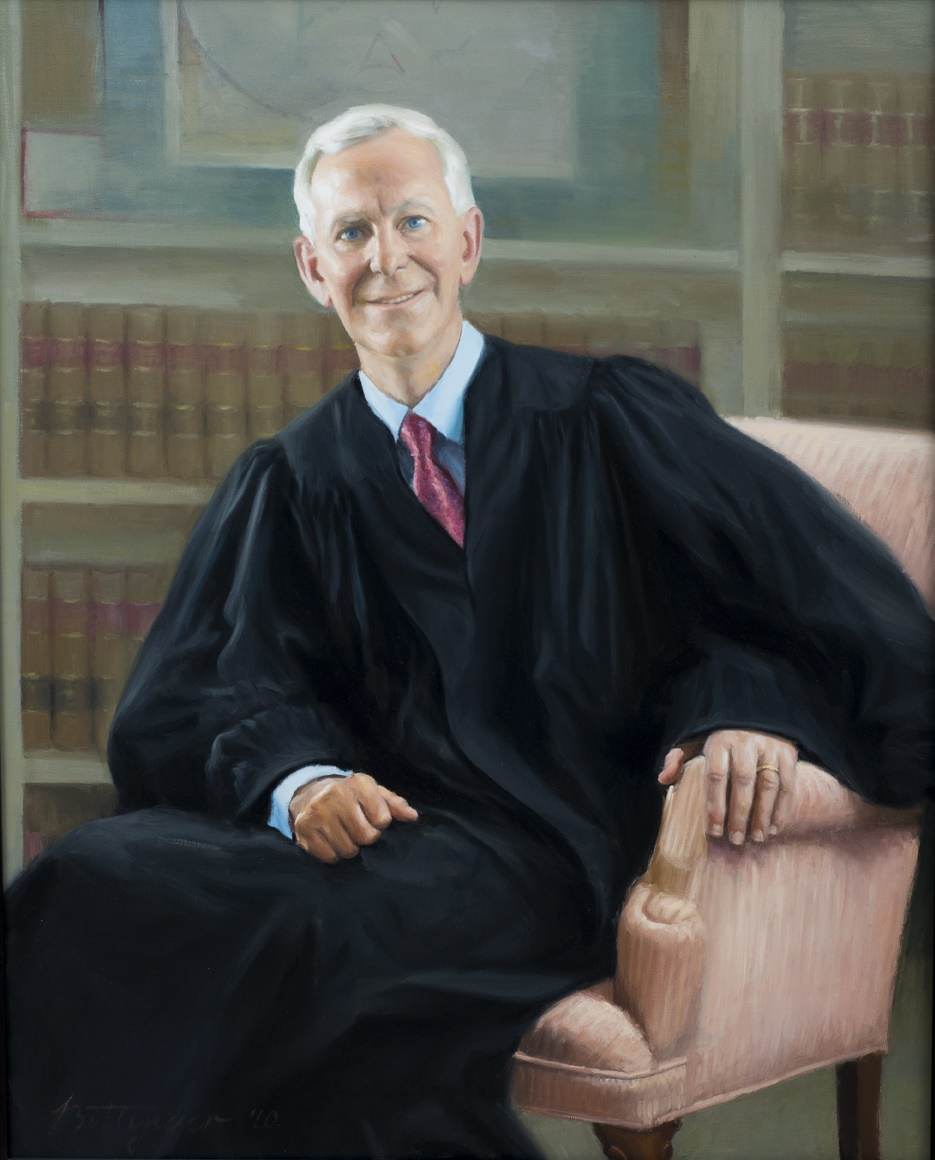

Senior Judge of the United States District Court for the District of Maryland
- In office December 17, 2010 – October 23, 2023

Chief Judge of the United States District Court for the District of Maryland
- In office 1994–2001
- Preceded by: Walter Evan Black Jr.
- Succeeded by: Frederic N. Smalkin

Judge of the United States District Court for the District of Maryland
- In office July 12, 1985 – December 17, 2010
- Appointed by: Ronald Reagan
- Preceded by: Seat established by 98 Stat. 333
- Succeeded by: James K. Bredar

United States Attorney for the District of Maryland
- In office July 29, 1981 – 1985
- Appointed by: Ronald Reagan
- Preceded by: Russell T. Baker
- Succeeded by: Catherine C. Blake (acting); Breckinridge L. Willcox

Personal details
- Born: December 30, 1942 Baltimore, Maryland, U.S.
- Died: October 23, 2023 (aged 80) Baltimore, Maryland, U.S.
- Spouse: Diana Gribbon Motz
- Education: Wesleyan University (AB); University of Virginia (LLB)

John Frederick Motz (December 30, 1942 – October 23, 2023) was a United States district judge of the United States District Court for the District of Maryland. He served as judge on that court from 1985 to his death. His previous experience included a range of positions as an Assistant United States Attorney and United States Attorney, and more than a decade in private practice. He was also chairman of the board of Trustees for Sheppard Pratt Health System.

== Education and career ==
Born on December 30, 1942, in Baltimore, Maryland, Motz received an Artium Baccalaureus degree from Wesleyan University in 1964 and a Bachelor of Laws from the University of Virginia School of Law in 1967. He served as a law clerk to Judge Harrison Lee Winter of the United States Court of Appeals for the Fourth Circuit from 1967 to 1968. He was in private practice in Baltimore from 1968 to 1969. He was an Assistant United States Attorney of the District of Maryland from 1969 to 1971. He was in private practice in Baltimore from 1971 to 1981. He was the United States Attorney for the District of Maryland from 1981 to 1985. His wife, Diana Gribbon Motz, sits on the Fourth Circuit.

== Federal judicial service ==
On April 23, 1985, Motz was nominated by President Ronald Reagan to a new seat on the United States District Court for the District of Maryland created by 98 Stat. 333. He was confirmed by the United States Senate on July 11, 1985, and received his commission on July 12, 1985. He served as Chief Judge from 1994 to 2001. He took senior status on December 17, 2010.

== Notable cases ==
In 1999, Motz ruled against Ida Wells, a former secretary for the Democratic National Committee, who had sued G. Gordon Liddy for defamation. Liddy, a White House 'plumber' for President Richard Nixon, had endorsed a theory in the book Silent Coup (1991), in Liddy's first major public statement about the Watergate case after his four-and-a-half-year prison sentence. The book argued White House counsel John Dean had orchestrated the Watergate break-in to find and conceal evidence that his then-girlfriend had been involved in prostitution, and some of the evidence was secreted in Wells' desk. Motz declared a mistrial, stating no "reasonable jury" could have ruled in favor of Wells.

In July 2006, Judge Motz struck down Maryland's "Wal-Mart Law" for violating the federal ERISA act. The Maryland law, Motz wrote, "violates ERISA's fundamental purpose of permitting multi-state employers to maintain nationwide health and welfare plans, providing uniform nationwide benefits and permitting uniform national administration." Republicans, including Gov. Ehrlich who was running for re-election, applauded this ruling on the grounds it would make Maryland a more friendly environment for new business.

In December 2011, Motz presided at the two-month trial in Salt Lake City of an anti-competition lawsuit where Novell claimed $1 billion from Microsoft. The issue was Microsoft's discontinuance of a Windows feature that Novell's WordPerfect software depended on; the company argued a theory of cross-market injury. Microsoft CEO Bill Gates testified on the witness stand for two days in defending his decision during the two-month trial. The complex case had been under litigation for seven years. On December 16, Judge Motz declared a mistrial due to a hung jury; after three days it had not reached the unanimous decision required. Corby Alvey, a 21-year-old security guard, held out for the defense position. Discussion with jurors afterward showed that the eleven who sided with Novell were divided in some of their thinking.

== Death ==
Motz died at his home in Baltimore on October 23, 2023. He was 80.

== Sources ==
Legal offices
Preceded by Seat established by 98 Stat. 333	Judge of the United States District Court for the District of Maryland; 1985–2010	Succeeded by James K. Bredar
Preceded by Walter Evan Black Jr.	Chief Judge of the United States District Court for the District of Maryland; 1994–2001	Succeeded by Frederic N. Smalkin
