= Paul V. Niemeyer =

American judge (born 1941)

Paul Niemeyer
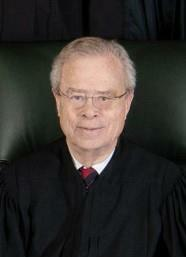

Judge of the United States Court of Appeals for the Fourth Circuit
- Incumbent
- Assumed office August 7, 1990
- Appointed by: George H. W. Bush
- Preceded by: Harrison Lee Winter

Judge of the United States District Court for the District of Maryland
- In office February 22, 1988 – August 10, 1990
- Appointed by: Ronald Reagan
- Preceded by: Frank Albert Kaufman
- Succeeded by: Benson Everett Legg

Personal details
- Born: Paul Victor Niemeyer; April 5, 1941 (age 85) Princeton, New Jersey, U.S.
- Education: Kenyon College (BA); Ludwig-Maximilians-Universität München; University of Notre Dame (JD)

Paul Victor Niemeyer (born April 5, 1941) is a United States circuit judge of the United States Court of Appeals for the Fourth Circuit and a former United States District Judge of the United States District Court for the District of Maryland.

== Education and career ==
Niemeyer was born in Princeton, New Jersey. He attended Kenyon College (Artium Baccalaureus, 1962), where he played on the school's baseball team. He then studied at the Ludwig-Maximilians-Universität München, before pursuing his legal education at Notre Dame Law School (Juris Doctor, 1966). He was admitted to the Maryland bar and practiced commercial law at Piper & Marbury (now DLA Piper) in Baltimore, Maryland, from 1966 to 1988. In 1984, Niemeyer co-authored the Maryland Rules Commentary, a treatise on the rules of procedure in the Maryland state courts.

From 1973–88, he was a member of the Maryland Court of Appeals Standing Committee on Rules of Practice and Procedure.

In 2006, Niemeyer published A Path Remembered: The Lives of Gerhart & Lucie Niemeyer. Niemeyer's father, Gerhart Niemeyer (1907–1997), was a political philosopher and professor of government at the University of Notre Dame. Niemeyer is married and has three sons.

Niemeyer's father was a conservative political philosopher and friend of William F. Buckley, Jr. Upon Hitler's rise, in 1933, Niemeyer's father left Germany for Spain and then the US. Niemeyer, like his father, studied at the Ludwig-Maximilians-Universität München. The New York Times obituary of June 29, 1997, states that Niemeyer's father: "wrote that fascism, communism and other such modern mass movements were the legacy of disoriented philosophers. He said their ideas corroded the cultural mettle of a society and spawned ideologies with a limited view of humanity."

== Federal judicial service ==
Niemeyer was nominated by President Ronald Reagan on September 11, 1987, to the United States District Court for the District of Maryland, to fill the seat vacated by Judge Frank Albert Kaufman. He was confirmed by the United States Senate on February 19, 1988, and received his commission on February 22, 1988. Niemeyer served on the district court until was elevated to the court of appeals on August 10, 1990.

On May 11, 1990, President George H. W. Bush nominated Niemeyer to the United States Court of Appeals for the Fourth Circuit to fill the seat vacated by Judge Harrison Lee Winter. Niemeyer was confirmed by unanimous consent of the United States Senate on August 3, 1990, and received his commission on August 7, 1990. His chambers are located in Baltimore. In 1993, Niemeyer became a member of the Advisory Committee on Federal Rules of Civil Procedure. He served as chair of the committee from 1996 through 2000. Niemeyer is a member of the American Law Institute and has taught Appellate Practice at Duke Law School.

== Notable cases ==
- On July 28, 2014, Niemeyer dissented from a 4th Circuit ruling that struck down Virginia's ban on same-sex marriage as unconstitutional. In his dissent, he argued that under a rational basis test Virginia's ban should be deemed constitutional.
- On April 19, 2016, Niemeyer dissented in part from a 4th Circuit ruling (G.G. v. Gloucester County School Board) in an appeal from the US District Court for the Eastern District of Virginia at Newport News where the majority of the 4th Circuit panel reversed the district court's dismissal of a transgender boy's claims under Title IX. Niemeyer's dissent states: "This unprecedented holding overrules custom, culture, and the very demands inherent in human nature for privacy and safety ... More particularly, it also misconstrues the clear language of Title IX and its regulations"; and "And finally, it reaches an unworkable and illogical result".
- On May 25, 2017, Niemeyer wrote a dissent when the en banc circuit upheld a lower court's injunction against the President's travel ban by a vote of 10–3 in International Refugee Assistance Project v. Trump. The decision would later be overruled by the Supreme Court in Trump v. Hawaii (2018).
- In March 2018, Niemeyer wrote a dissent when the circuit denied en banc rehearing to a divided panel's conclusion that the Bladensburg Peace Cross memorial from World War I violated the Constitution's Establishment Clause. The Fourth Circuit's judgment was then reversed by the U.S. Supreme Court in American Legion v. American Humanist Association (2019).
- In August 2020, Niemeyer dissented from the 2–1 majority in G. G. v. Gloucester County School Board. In a 2–1 decision, the court ruled for Gavin Grimm, a trans man who had sued the Gloucester County School Board in Virginia who had prohibited him from using the boys' bathroom. Niemeyer wrote in dissent “I readily accept the facts of Grimm’s sex status and gender identity and his felt need to be treated with dignity. Affording all persons the respect owed to them by virtue of their humanity is a core value underlying our civil society. At the same time, our role as a court is limited. We are commissioned to apply the law and must leave it to Congress to determine policy. In this instance, the School Board offered its students male and female restrooms, legitimately separating them on the basis of sex. It also provided safe and private unisex restrooms that Grimm, along with all other students, could use. These offerings fully complied with both Title IX and the Equal Protection Clause.”

== See also ==
- List of United States federal judges by longevity of service

Legal offices
Preceded by Frank Albert Kaufman	Judge of the United States District Court for the District of Maryland; 1988–1990	Succeeded by Benson Everett Legg
Preceded by Harrison Lee Winter	Judge of the United States Court of Appeals for the Fourth Circuit; 1990–present	Incumbent
