= Walter Evan Black Jr. =

American judge (1926–2014)

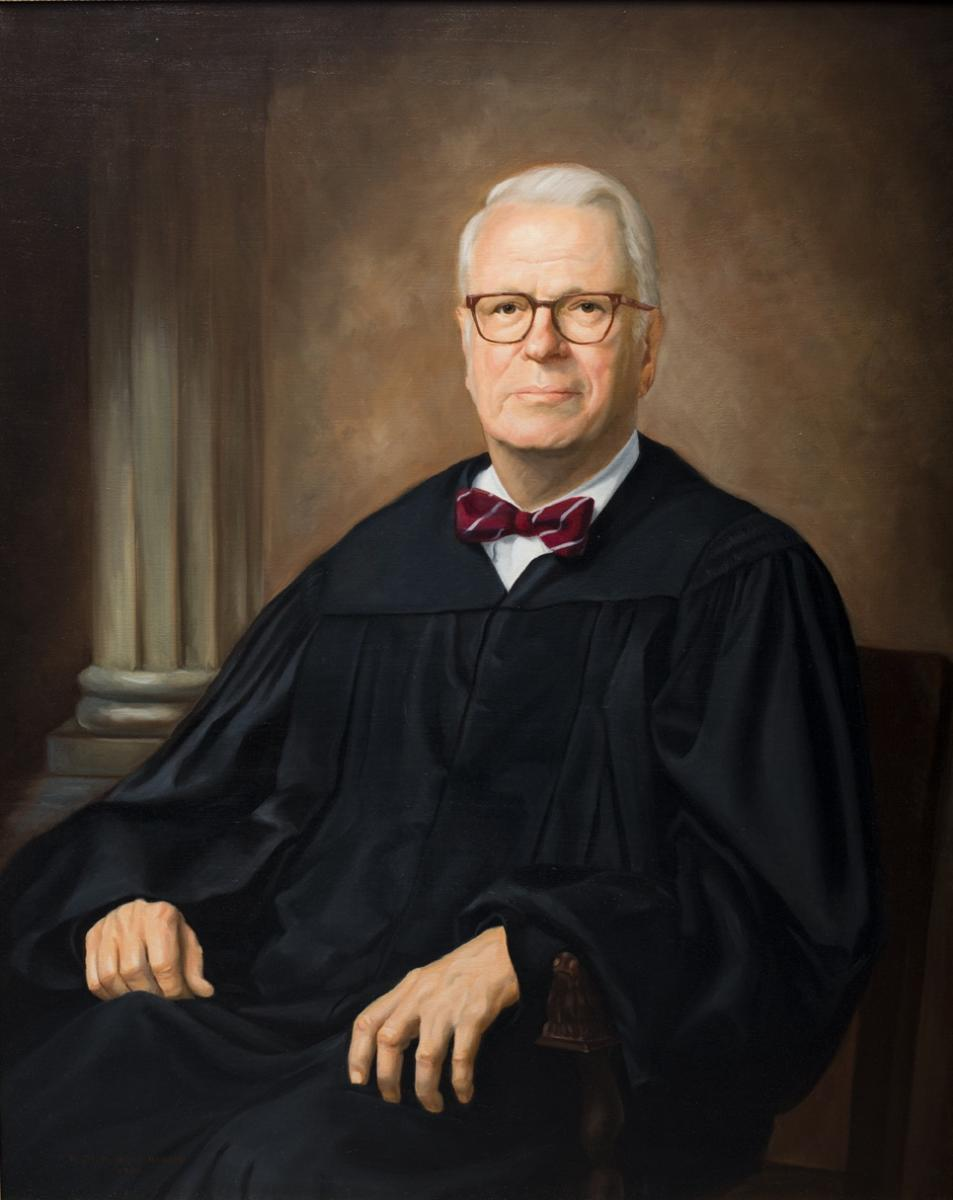

Senior Judge of the United States District Court for the District of Maryland
- In office October 21, 1994 – September 29, 2014

Chief Judge of the United States District Court for the District of Maryland
- In office 1991–1994
- Preceded by: Alexander Harvey II
- Succeeded by: J. Frederick Motz

Judge of the United States District Court for the District of Maryland
- In office April 21, 1982 – October 21, 1994
- Appointed by: Ronald Reagan
- Preceded by: Edward Skottowe Northrop
- Succeeded by: Andre M. Davis

United States Attorney for the District of Maryland
- In office 1956–1957
- Preceded by: George Cochran Doub
- Succeeded by: Robert H. Kernon

Personal details
- Born: Walter Evan Black Jr. July 7, 1926 Baltimore, Maryland
- Died: September 29, 2014 (aged 88) Easton, Maryland
- Education: Harvard University (A.B.); Harvard Law School (LL.B.)

Walter Evan Black Jr. (July 7, 1926 – September 29, 2014) was a United States district judge of the United States District Court for the District of Maryland.

== Education and career ==
Born in Baltimore, Maryland, Black received an Artium Baccalaureus degree from Harvard University in 1947 and a Bachelor of Laws from Harvard Law School in 1949. He was in private practice in Baltimore from 1949 to 1953. He served as an Assistant United States Attorney of the District of Maryland from 1953 to 1955, and was himself the United States Attorney for the District of Maryland from 1956 to 1957. He then returned to private practice in Baltimore until 1982.

== Federal judicial service ==
On March 11, 1982, Black was nominated by President Ronald Reagan to a seat on the United States District Court for the District of Maryland vacated by Judge Edward Skottowe Northrop. Black was confirmed by the United States Senate on April 20, 1982, and received his commission on April 21, 1982. He served as Chief Judge from 1991 to 1994, assuming senior status on October 21, 1994. He took inactive senior status on June 30, 2003, meaning he remained a Judge of the court but no longer heard cases or participated in court business, remaining in that status until his death.

== Death ==
Black died in Easton, Maryland, on September 29, 2014, from complications of Parkinson's disease.

== Sources ==
Legal offices
Preceded by Edward Skottowe Northrop	Judge of the United States District Court for the District of Maryland; 1982–1994	Succeeded by Andre M. Davis
Preceded by Alexander Harvey II	Chief Judge of the United States District Court for the District of Maryland; 1991–1994	Succeeded by J. Frederick Motz
