= James K. Bredar =

American judge (born 1957)

James Bredar
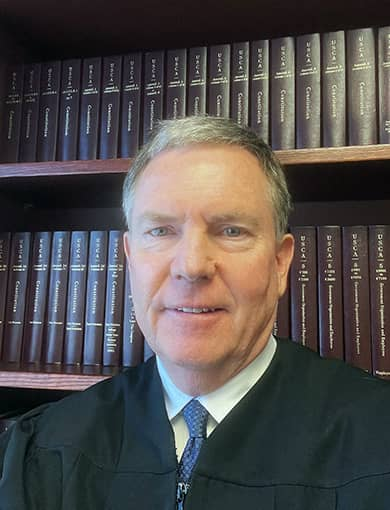

Senior Judge of the United States District Court for the District of Maryland
- Incumbent
- Assumed office April 30, 2024

Chief Judge of the United States District Court for the District of Maryland
- In office October 6, 2017 – April 30, 2024
- Preceded by: Catherine C. Blake
- Succeeded by: George L. Russell III

Judge of the United States District Court for the District of Maryland
- In office December 17, 2010 – April 30, 2024
- Appointed by: Barack Obama
- Preceded by: J. Frederick Motz
- Succeeded by: Adam B. Abelson

Magistrate Judge of the United States District Court for the District of Maryland
- In office 1998 – December 17, 2010

Personal details
- Born: February 6, 1957 (age 69) Omaha, Nebraska, U.S.
- Education: Harvard College (BA); Georgetown University (JD)

James Kelleher Bredar (born February 6, 1957) is a senior United States district judge of the United States District Court for the District of Maryland. He previously served as a United States magistrate judge of the same court.

== Early life and education ==
Bredar was born on February 6, 1957, in Omaha, Nebraska and he was raised in Denver, Colorado, where he attended parochial and public schools. He earned a Bachelor of Arts degree in 1979 from Harvard College and a Juris Doctor degree in 1982 from the Georgetown University Law Center. From 1981 until 1982 he was a Visiting Student at the Yale Law School.

== Career ==
Bredar clerked for Judge Richard P. Matsch of the United States District Court for the District of Colorado. He then served as a deputy district attorney in Moffat County, Colorado, from 1984 to 1985, and as an Assistant United States Attorney for the District of Colorado from 1985 to 1989. He later served as an assistant federal public defender in the District of Colorado from 1989 to 1991. During 1991 and 1992, Bredar served as a project director for the Vera Institute of Justice, a research organization based in New York. Bredar served in London, England. Bredar served as the federal public defender for the District of Maryland from 1992 to 1998.

=== Federal judicial service ===
Bredar served as a United States magistrate judge from January 26, 1998, to December 17, 2010.

On April 21, 2010, President Barack Obama nominated Bredar to be a United States District Judge for the United States District Court for the District of Maryland. His nomination was confirmed in the Senate by unanimous consent on December 16, 2010. He received his commission on December 17, 2010, and was sworn in on December 22, 2010. He served as chief judge from October 6, 2017, to April 30, 2024. Bredar assumed senior status on April 30, 2024.

=== Notable cases ===
In April 2017, Bredar approved a consent decree signed by the Mayor of Baltimore; the Baltimore Police Department; and the U.S. Department of Justice, Civil Rights Division. The consent decree called for major reforms within the police department. Negotiation of the decree had followed an investigation by the Department of Justice of the police department, as requested by the city in 2015. Bredar denied a request by then-recently appointed Attorney General Jeff Sessions to postpone signing for thirty days in order to give the new administration time to review the decree; Bredar said the Court was satisfied with the decree and that it was time to get the changes underway.

Bredar was one of three judges assigned to a case captioned Benisek v. Lamone, No. 1:13-cv-03233-JKB (D. Md.). The case challenged Maryland's 2011 congressional redistricting map, and specifically Maryland's 6th congressional district, as an unconstitutional partisan gerrymander. The district court entered summary judgment in Plaintiffs' favor in late 2018, and the State sought review by the Supreme Court of the United States. The case was consolidated with Rucho v. Common Cause, a case that challenged the North Carolina congressional map as a partisan gerrymander. In a 5–4 decision issued in June 2019, the Supreme Court held that partisan gerrymandering claims present nonjusticiable political questions. Justice Kagan, dissenting, observed that "[f]or the first time ever, th[e] Court refuses to remedy a constitutional violation because it thinks the task beyond judicial capabilities."

In an opinion at an earlier stage in the Benisek proceedings, Bredar had noted that "[p]artisan gerrymandering is noxious, a cancer on our democracy."

Legal offices
Preceded by J. Frederick Motz	Judge of the United States District Court for the District of Maryland; 2010–2024	Succeeded by Adam B. Abelson
Preceded by Catherine C. Blake	Chief Judge of the United States District Court for the District of Maryland; 2017–2024	Succeeded by George L. Russell III
