= Alexander Harvey II =

American judge

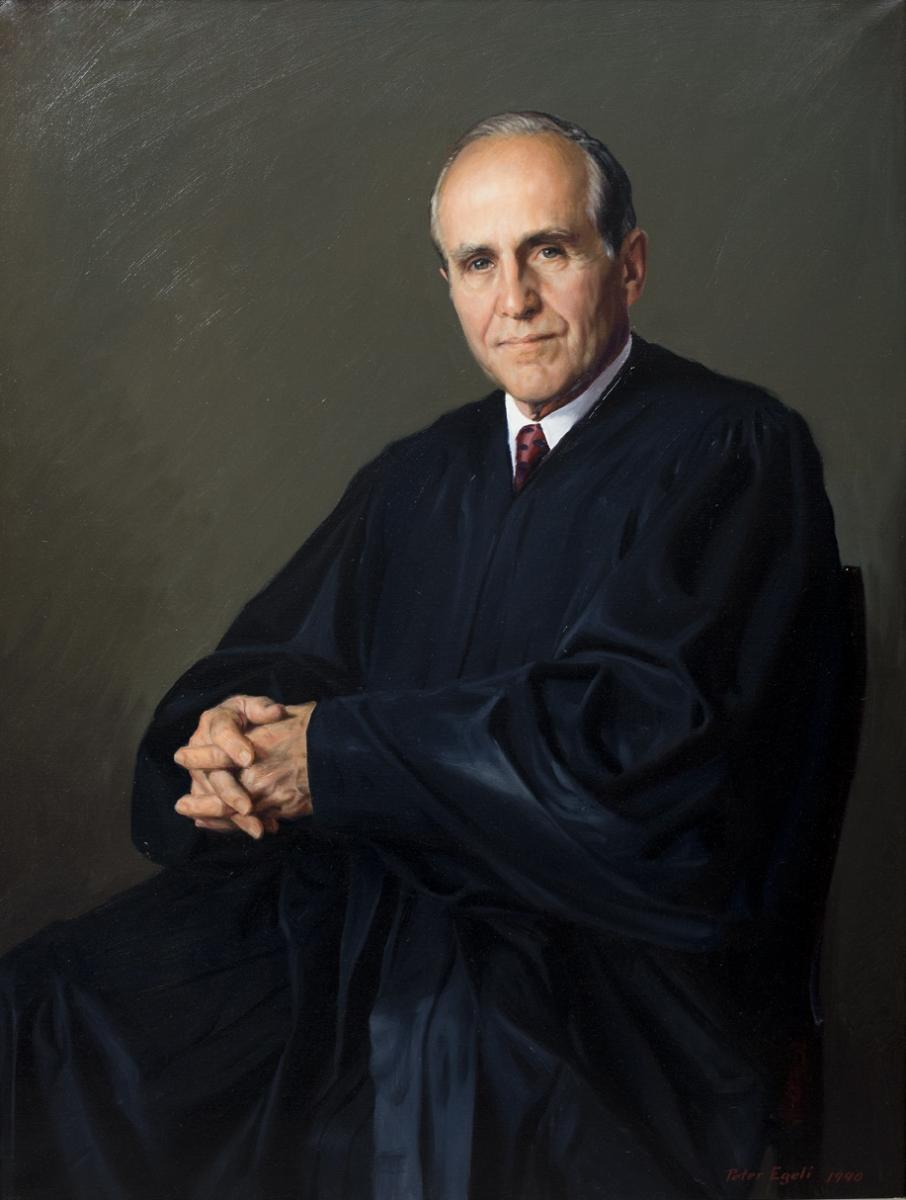

Senior Judge of the United States District Court for the District of Maryland
- In office March 8, 1991 – December 4, 2017

Chief Judge of the United States District Court for the District of Maryland
- In office 1986–1991
- Preceded by: Frank Albert Kaufman
- Succeeded by: Walter Evan Black Jr.

Judge of the United States District Court for the District of Maryland
- In office September 22, 1966 – March 8, 1991
- Appointed by: Lyndon B. Johnson
- Preceded by: Harrison Lee Winter
- Succeeded by: Deborah K. Chasanow

Personal details
- Born: Alexander Harvey II; May 3, 1923 Baltimore, Maryland, U.S.
- Died: December 4, 2017 (aged 94) Baltimore, Maryland, U.S.
- Education: Yale University (B.A.); Columbia Law School (LL.B.)

Alexander Harvey II (May 3, 1923 – December 4, 2017) was a United States district judge of the United States District Court for the District of Maryland.

== Education and career ==
Born in Baltimore, Maryland, Harvey was in the United States Army during World War II, from 1943 to 1946. He received a Bachelor of Arts degree from Yale University in 1947, and a Bachelor of Laws from Columbia Law School in 1950. He was in private practice of law in Baltimore from 1950 to 1966, and was an assistant state attorney general of Maryland from 1955 to 1957.

== Federal judicial service ==
On September 9, 1966, President Lyndon B. Johnson nominated Harvey to a seat on the United States District Court for the District of Maryland vacated by Judge Harrison Lee Winter. Harvey was confirmed by the United States Senate on September 22, 1966, and received his commission the same day. He served as Chief Judge from 1986 to 1991, and assumed senior status on March 8, 1991, and took inactive status on January 30, 2004. Harvey died on December 4, 2017, in Baltimore, at the age of 94.

== See also ==
- List of United States federal judges by longevity of service

Legal offices
Preceded by Harrison Lee Winter	Judge of the United States District Court for the District of Maryland; 1966–1991	Succeeded by Deborah K. Chasanow
Preceded by Frank Albert Kaufman	Chief Judge of the United States District Court for the District of Maryland; 1986–1991	Succeeded by Walter Evan Black Jr.
