= Catherine C. Blake =

American judge (1950–2026)

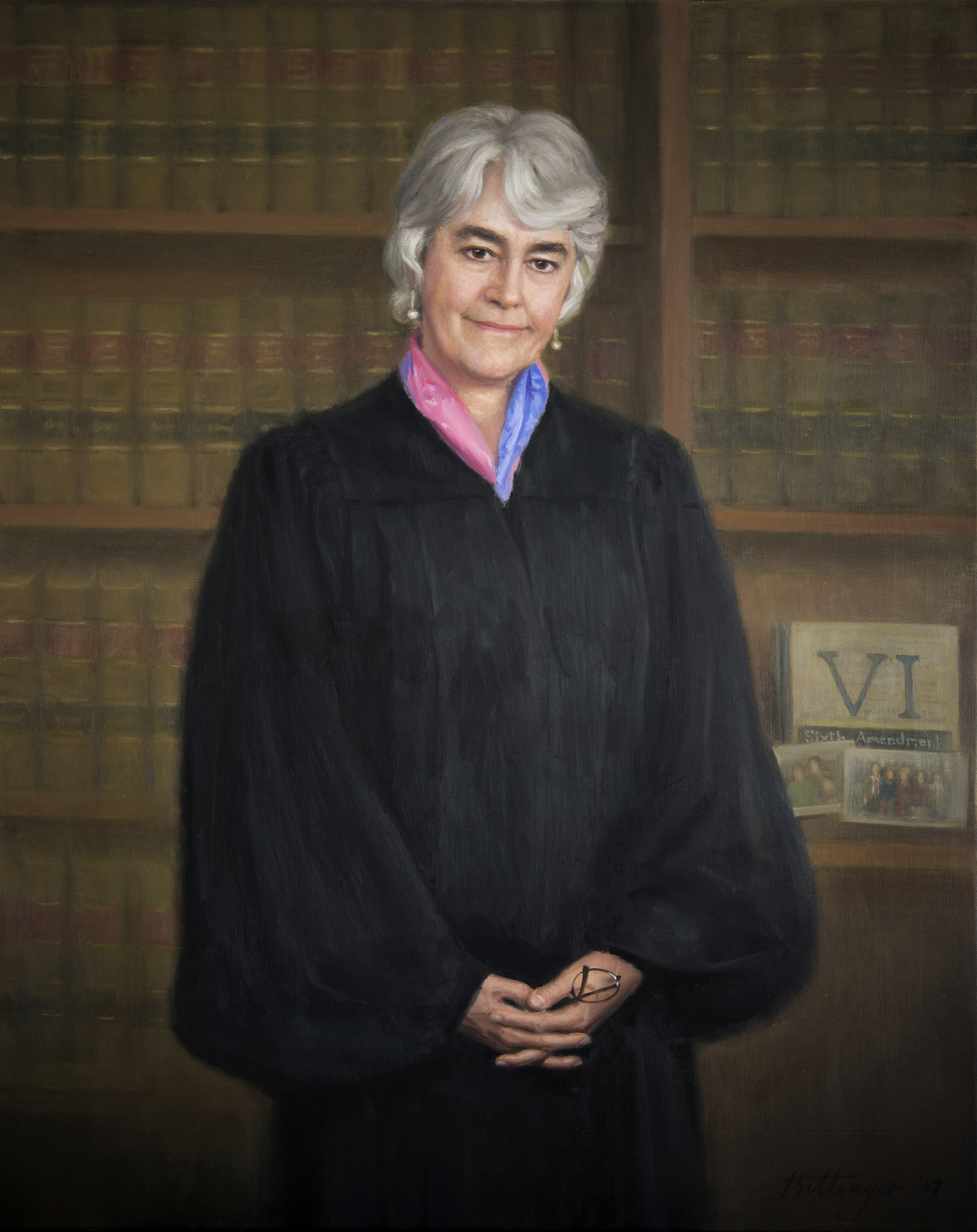

Senior Judge of the United States District Court for the District of Maryland
- In office April 2, 2021 – March 4, 2026

Chief Judge of the United States District Court for the District of Maryland
- In office October 3, 2014 – October 6, 2017
- Preceded by: Deborah K. Chasanow
- Succeeded by: James K. Bredar

Judge of the United States District Court for the District of Maryland
- In office August 14, 1995 – April 2, 2021
- Appointed by: Bill Clinton
- Preceded by: John R. Hargrove Sr.
- Succeeded by: Lydia Griggsby

Magistrate Judge of the United States District Court for the District of Maryland
- In office 1987 – August 14, 1995

Acting United States Attorney for the District of Maryland
- In office April 23, 1985 – May 14, 1986
- Preceded by: J. Frederick Motz
- Succeeded by: Breckinridge L. Willcox

Personal details
- Born: Catherine Curtis Blake; July 27, 1950 Boston, Massachusetts, U.S.
- Died: March 4, 2026 (aged 75) Towson, Maryland, U.S.
- Education: Radcliffe College (AB); Harvard Law School (JD)

Catherine Curtis Blake (July 27, 1950 – March 4, 2026) was a United States district judge of the United States District Court for the District of Maryland.

== Early life and education ==
Blake was born in Boston, Massachusetts, on July 27, 1950. After receiving an Artium Baccalaureus degree from Radcliffe College in 1972, she enrolled in Harvard Law School, where she received a Juris Doctor in 1975.

== Career ==
Blake was in private practice in Boston, from 1975 to 1977. She was with the Office of the United States Attorney for the District of Maryland from 1977 to 1987. During that period, she was an Assistant United States Attorney from 1977 to 1983, then became a first assistant from 1983 to 1985, when she was appointed by the court to serve as the United States Attorney, a position she held until 1987, when she again became the first assistant.

== Federal judicial service ==
In 1987, Blake became a United States magistrate judge of the District of Maryland. In 1995, Blake became a United States District Judge of the United States District Court for the District of Maryland. She was nominated by President Bill Clinton on May 4, 1995, to a seat vacated by John R. Hargrove Sr. She was confirmed by the United States Senate on August 11, 1995, and received her commission on August 14, 1995. She served as Chief Judge of the District of Maryland from October 3, 2014 to October 6, 2017. She assumed senior status on April 2, 2021.

Judge Blake presided over the infamous Baltimore Gun Trace Task Force case. She is portrayed in the final episode of the HBO miniseries "We Own This City" which depicts the events surrounding the case.

In October 2020, Judge Blake struck down a constitutional challenge to Governor Hogan's executive order that mandated state contractors were not allowed to engage in a political or economic boycott of Israel in their business or personal life. The case was one of several constitutional challenges to anti-BDS laws since 2017.

== Death ==
Blake died in Towson, Maryland, on March 4, 2026, after a lengthy illness. She was 75.

Legal offices
Preceded by John R. Hargrove	Judge of the United States District Court for the District of Maryland; 1995–2021	Succeeded by Lydia Griggsby
Preceded by Deborah K. Chasanow	Chief Judge of the United States District Court for the District of Maryland; 2014–2017	Succeeded by James K. Bredar
