= Frank Albert Kaufman =

American judge

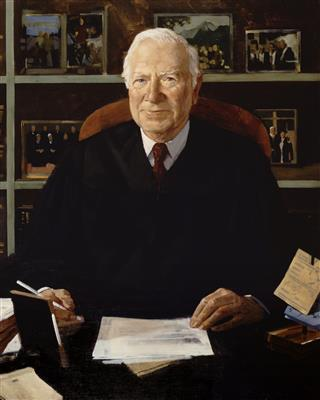

Senior Judge of the United States District Court for the District of Maryland
- In office June 16, 1986 – July 31, 1997

Chief Judge of the United States District Court for the District of Maryland
- In office 1981–1986
- Preceded by: Edward Skottowe Northrop
- Succeeded by: Alexander Harvey II

Judge of the United States District Court for the District of Maryland
- In office September 22, 1966 – June 16, 1986
- Appointed by: Lyndon B. Johnson
- Preceded by: Seat established by 80 Stat. 75
- Succeeded by: Paul V. Niemeyer

Personal details
- Born: Frank Albert Kaufman; March 4, 1916 Baltimore, Maryland
- Died: July 31, 1997 (aged 81) Baltimore, Maryland
- Education: Dartmouth College (A.B.); Harvard Law School (LL.B.)

Frank Albert Kaufman (March 4, 1916 – July 31, 1997) was a United States district judge of the United States District Court for the District of Maryland.

== Education and career ==
Born in Baltimore, Maryland, Kaufman received a Bachelor of Arts degree from Dartmouth College in 1937 and a Bachelor of Laws from Harvard Law School in 1940. He was an attorney of the Office of the General Counsel of the United States Department of the Treasury from 1940 to 1941. He was an attorney of the Office of the General Counsel of the Lend Lease Administration from 1941 to 1942. He was United States Lend Lease representative in Turkey from 1942 to 1943. He was assistant to the Chief of the Psychological Warfare Board of the Allied Force Headquarters from 1943 to 1944. He was Chief of the Leaflet Division of the Psychological Warfare Division of the Supreme Headquarters Allied Expeditionary Force from 1944 to 1945. He was assistant to the general counsel of the Foreign Economic Administration in 1945. He was in private practice in Baltimore from 1945 to 1966. He was a consultant for the Psychological Warfare Department of the United States Army in Washington, D.C., from 1951 to 1953. He was a Lecturer for the University of Baltimore School of Law from 1948 to 1962. He was a Lecturer for the University of Maryland School of Law from 1953 to 1954.

== Federal judicial service ==
Kaufman was nominated by President Lyndon B. Johnson on September 9, 1966, to the United States District Court for the District of Maryland, to a new seat created by 80 Stat. 75. He was confirmed by the United States Senate on September 22, 1966, and received his commission the same day. He served as Chief Judge from 1981 to 1986. He was a member of the Judicial Conference of the United States from 1985 to 1991. He assumed senior status on June 16, 1986. Kaufman served in that capacity until his death on July 31, 1997, in Baltimore.

== See also ==
- List of Jewish American jurists

== Sources ==
Legal offices
Preceded by Seat established by 80 Stat. 75	Judge of the United States District Court for the District of Maryland; 1966–1986	Succeeded by Paul V. Niemeyer
Preceded by Edward Skottowe Northrop	Chief Judge of the United States District Court for the District of Maryland; 1981–1986	Succeeded by Alexander Harvey II
