= Richard D. Bennett =

American judge (born 1947)

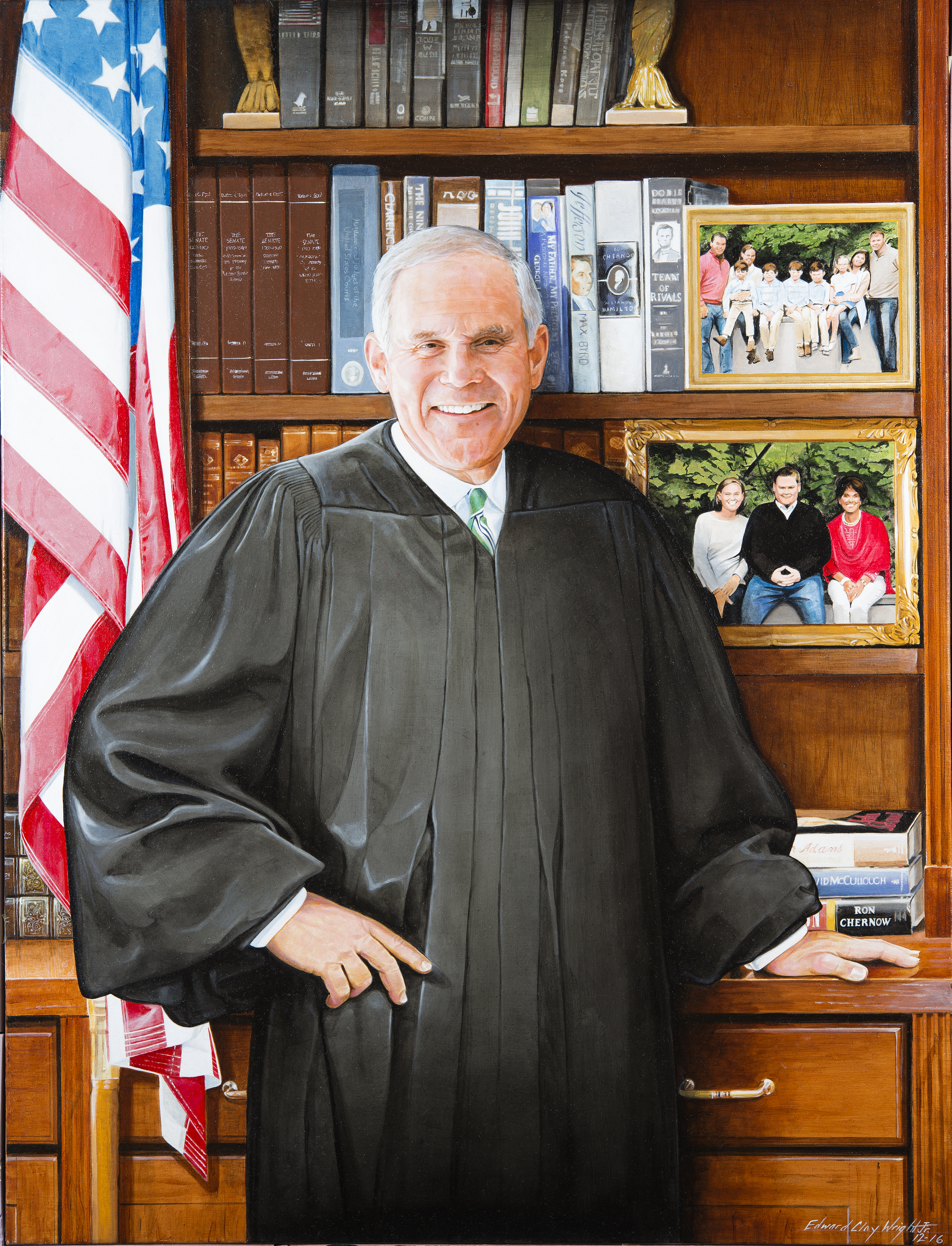
- Official portrait, 2017

Senior Judge of the United States District Court for the District of Maryland
- Incumbent
- Assumed office June 30, 2021

Judge of the United States District Court for the District of Maryland
- In office April 10, 2003 – June 30, 2021
- Appointed by: George W. Bush
- Preceded by: Frederic N. Smalkin
- Succeeded by: Deborah Boardman

United States Attorney for the District of Maryland
- In office May 09, 1991 – January 20, 1993
- Appointed by: George H. W. Bush
- Preceded by: Breckinridge L. Willcox
- Succeeded by: Gary P. Jordan (acting); Lynne A. Battaglia

Personal details
- Born: August 12, 1947 (age 79) Baltimore, Maryland
- Party: Republican
- Education: University of Pennsylvania (BA); University of Maryland School of Law (JD)

Richard D. Bennett (born August 12, 1947) is a United States Senior District Judge of the United States District Court for the District of Maryland. Born in Maryland, Bennett is a graduate of Severn School, the University of Pennsylvania, and the University of Maryland Francis King Carey School of Law. He previously served as an Assistant United States Attorney and the United States Attorney for Maryland, and was awarded multiple commendations for his service. In private practice, Bennett was a partner in a major Maryland law firm, where he specialized in white collar criminal defense. Appointed to the federal bench in 2003, he took senior status in 2021. While maintaining an active trial docket in the District of Maryland, Bennett has increasingly been sitting by designation with the United States Court of Appeals for the Ninth Circuit.

== Education and career ==
Born in Baltimore, Maryland, Bennett grew up in Severna Park near Annapolis, and attended Severn School. In 1969, he received a Bachelor of Arts degree from the University of Pennsylvania, where he majored in Political Science with a study in the Russian language. At Penn, he was selected to the Sphinx Senior Honor Society, one of the oldest societies at the University, and was elected as one of four officers for his graduating class. Following a period of military service, Bennett returned home to Maryland, and pursued the practice of law. In 1973, he received a Juris Doctor from the University of Maryland School of Law, where he served as a member of the Maryland Law Review and won academic awards.

In 1976, Bennett was appointed to serve as an Assistant United States Attorney of the District of Maryland. He remained in that position until 1981, when he returned to private practice. In 1991, Bennett was unanimously confirmed by the United States Senate as the United States Attorney for the District of Maryland. In that position he received the Outstanding Service Award from the Maryland State's Attorneys Association, and an award from the Governor of Maryland for outstanding contributions in the field of victim rights.

In 1993, Bennett returned to private practice as a partner at the Maryland law firm of Miles and Stockbridge, PC, where he spearheaded that firm's white collar criminal defense and government investigations practice. Bennett would remain at the firm until his appointment to the federal bench in 2003. During his tenure, Bennett defended several high-profile clients, including Democratic State Delegate Tony E. Fulton, who was acquitted in 2000 of federal fraud and conspiracy charges. He was also retained by the United States House of Representatives as Special Counsel to investigate foreign campaign contributions in the 1996 United States Presidential Election. He was recognized by a respected national publication as one of the "Best Lawyers in America."

In addition to his active federal trial practice, Bennett was a leading figure in the Maryland Republican Party. He was the 1994 Republican candidate for Attorney General of Maryland and the 1998 Republican candidate for Lieutenant Governor, having been selected by Ellen R. Sauerbrey as her running mate in her gubernatorial campaign. He was selected as a delegate to the Republican National Conventions in 1988, 1996, and 2000. At a Maryland state Republican Party convention in 1998, he was elected by acclamation to serve as the Chairman of the Maryland Republican Party. In that capacity, he represented Maryland on the Republican National Committee until 2000, when he resigned out of his determination to represent Democratic State Delegate Tony E. Fulton in a high-profile federal corruption case.

Outside of his legal practice, Bennett served over 20 years in the United States Army Reserve and the Maryland National Guard, and is a Major in the Retired Reserve. During his service, he received the Maryland Commendation Medal for Outstanding Service, the Maryland Distinguished Service Cross for Service Beyond the Call of Duty, and the Meritorious Service Medal. Bennett is also a Life Fellow of the American Bar Foundation and the Maryland State Bar Foundation. He has served on the board of the Kennedy-Krieger Institute for Disabled Children, and the Board of Trustees of Severn School, where he has been inducted to that school’s athletic Hall of Fame, and received the school’s Distinguished Alumnus Award. He has also served on the Board of Visitors of the University of Maryland Francis King Carey School of Law which has awarded him the prestigious Barbera Judicial Excellence Award in recognition of his exemplifying the highest standards of judicial excellence and extraordinary courage in the handling of complex and difficult cases.

== Federal Judicial Service ==
On January 29, 2003, Bennett was nominated by President George W. Bush to a seat on the United States District Court for the District of Maryland vacated by Frederic N. Smalkin. Bennett's nomination received the strong, bipartisan support of Democratic Senators Paul S. Sarbanes and Barbara A. Mikulski, and was praised by prominent members of the Maryland legal community. He was unanimously confirmed with a vote of 99-0 by the United States Senate on April 9, 2003, received his commission on April 10, 2003, and took his oath of office on April 29, 2003. After more than eighteen years on the federal bench, Bennett assumed senior status on June 30, 2021. Since taking senior status, Bennett has continued to maintain an active trial docket. Additionally, Bennett has been frequently sitting by designation with the United States Court of Appeals for the Ninth Circuit.

In October 2009, Judge Bennett was appointed by Chief Justice John G. Roberts, Jr. to serve on the International Judicial Relations Committee of the United States Judicial Conference. He has traveled extensively in Central and Eastern Europe participating in judicial exchange programs in Russia, Estonia, Bulgaria, Turkey, Ukraine and the Czech Republic.

== Notable Cases ==
In 2011 he presided in the case of National Security Agency Whistleblower Thomas Andrews Drake. He was also the trial judge in Snyder v. Phelps, in which case he was reversed by the United States Court of Appeals for the Fourth Circuit, and ultimately by the United States Supreme Court.

In National Federation of the Blind v. Lamone, 2014 WL 4388342 Bennett held that the State of Maryland's refusal to provide an online ballot marking tool to enable blind residents to vote privately and independently violated the Americans With Disabilities Act, 42 U.S.C. §1201. This ruling, called "historic" by the President of the National Federation of the Blind, was affirmed by the U.S. Court of Appeals for the Fourth Circuit in National Federation of the Blind v. Lamone, 813 F.3d 494 (4th Cir. 2016).

Henson v. Santander Consumer USA, Inc., 2014 WL 1806915, Bennett held that a company may collect debts that it purchased for its own account without therefore being classified as a debt collector within the ambit of the Fair Debt Collection Practices Act. 15 U.S.C. §1692(a)(6). His opinion was affirmed by the United States Court of Appeals for the Fourth Circuit, 817 F.3d 131 (2016), and by the United States Supreme Court in a unanimous ruling, 137 S. Ct. 1718 (2017), affirming Bennett’s initial ruling that the federal statue applies to debt collectors who regularly seek to collect debts and not a debt owner seeking to collect debts for itself.

Mayor and City of Baltimore v. Azar, 392 F. Supp 3d 602, Bennett issued preliminary and permanent injunctions halting the implementation of a U.S. Department of Health and Human Services Rule that would prohibit physicians from referring patients for an abortion, even if that is the patient’s desire ( a so-called “gag rule”). He was affirmed by the United States Court of Appeals for the Fourth Circuit in an en banc ruling, 973 F.3d 258 (2020). Bennett declined to issue a nationwide injunction, limiting his ruling to the State of Maryland.

Leaders of a Beautiful Struggle v. Baltimore Police Department, 456 F. Supp. 3d 699, a case that received nationwide attention addressing Baltimore’s six-month Aerial Investigation Research (“AIR”) program in light of United States v. Carpenter, 138 S. Ct. 2206 (2018), Bennett held that the warrantless operation of the AIR surveillance program did not violate the Fourth Amendment prohibition on unreasonable searches and seizures. His opinion was affirmed by panel of the United States Court of Appeals for the Fourth Circuit by a 2-1 vote, 979 F.3d 219 (4th Cir. 2020), and subsequently reversed in an 8-7 decision by the Fourth Circuit sitting en banc, 2 F.4th 330 (4th Cir. 2021).

== Sources ==
Legal offices
Preceded by Breckinridge L. Willcox	United States Attorney for the District of Maryland; 1991–1993	Succeeded by Lynne A. Battaglia
Preceded by Frederic N. Smalkin	Judge of the United States District Court for the District of Maryland; 2003–2021	Succeeded by Deborah Boardman
