= Edward Skottowe Northrop =

American judge

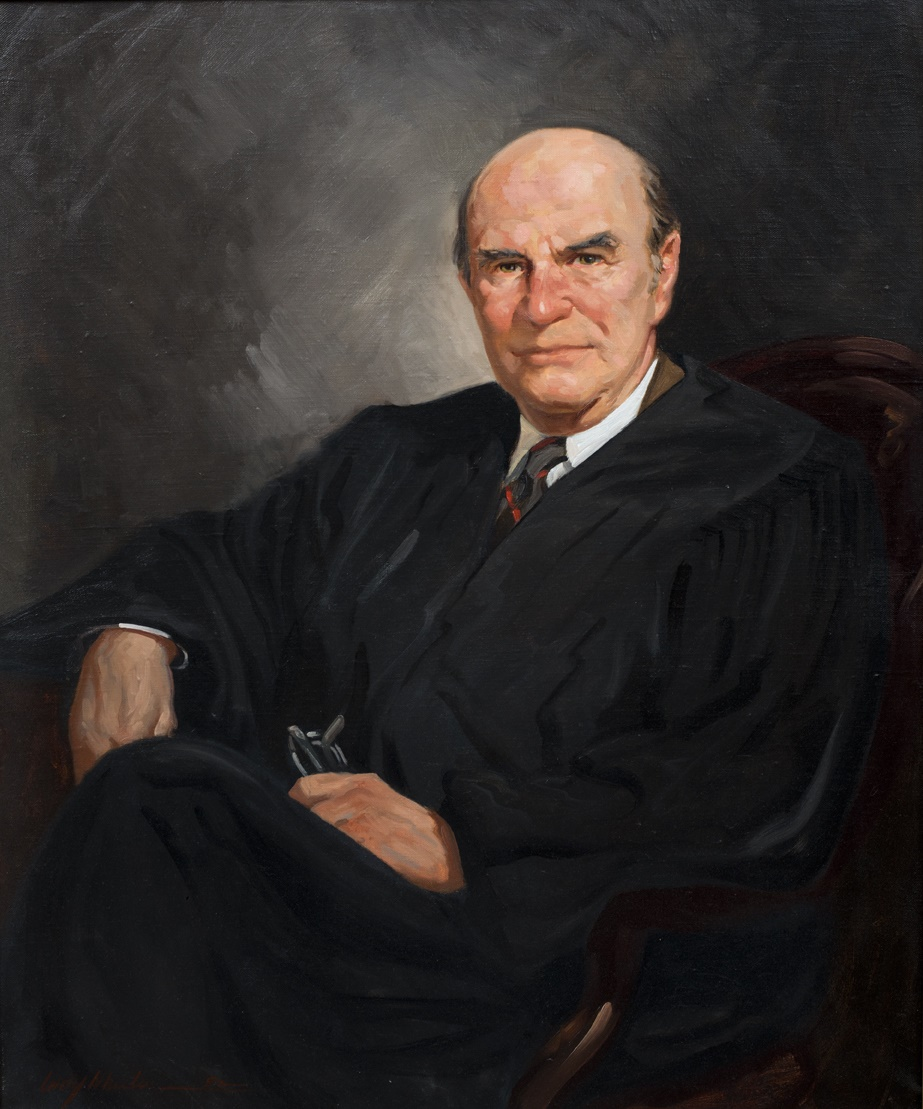

Judge of the United States Foreign Intelligence Surveillance Court of Review
- In office January 11, 1985 – January 10, 1992
- Appointed by: Warren E. Burger
- Preceded by: James E. Barrett
- Succeeded by: Bobby Baldock

Senior Judge of the United States District Court for the District of Maryland
- In office June 12, 1981 – August 12, 2003

Chief Judge of the United States District Court for the District of Maryland
- In office September 23, 1970 – June 12, 1981
- Preceded by: Robert Dorsey Watkins
- Succeeded by: Frank Albert Kaufman

Judge of the United States District Court for the District of Maryland
- In office September 5, 1961 – June 12, 1981
- Appointed by: John F. Kennedy
- Preceded by: Seat established by 75 Stat. 80
- Succeeded by: Walter Evan Black Jr.

Member of the Maryland Senate
- In office 1954-1961

Personal details
- Born: Edward Skottowe Northrop; June 21, 1911 Chevy Chase, Maryland, U.S.
- Died: August 12, 2003 (aged 92) Sandy Spring, Maryland, U.S.
- Education: George Washington University Law School (LL.B.)

Edward Skottowe Northrop (June 12, 1911 – August 12, 2003) was a United States district judge of the United States District Court for the District of Maryland.

== Education and career ==
Born in Chevy Chase, Maryland, Northrop received a Bachelor of Laws from George Washington University Law School in 1937. He was manager of the Village of Chevy Chase from 1935 to 1941. He was attorney for the Village of Chevy Chase from 1941 to 1961. He was in the United States Navy as a Commander from 1941 to 1945. He was in private practice in Rockville, Maryland and Washington, D.C. from 1945 to 1961. He was a member of the Maryland Senate from 1954 to 1961, serving as Majority Leader from 1958 to 1961.

== Federal judicial service ==
Northrop was nominated by President John F. Kennedy on August 23, 1961, to the United States District Court for the District of Maryland, to a new seat created by 75 Stat. 80. He was confirmed by the United States Senate on September 1, 1961, and received his commission on September 5, 1961. He served as Chief Judge from 1970 to 1981. He was a member of the Judicial Panel on Multidistrict Litigation from 1979 to 1983. He assumed senior status on June 12, 1981. He served as a Judge of the United States Foreign Intelligence Surveillance Court of Review from January 11, 1985 to January 10, 1982. Northrop served in senior status until his death on August 12, 2003, in Sandy Spring, Maryland.

== Sources ==
Legal offices
Preceded by Seat established by 75 Stat. 80	Judge of the United States District Court for the District of Maryland; 1961–1981	Succeeded by Walter Evan Black Jr.
Preceded by Robert Dorsey Watkins	Chief Judge of the United States District Court for the District of Maryland; 1970–1981	Succeeded by Frank Albert Kaufman
Preceded by James E. Barrett	Judge of the United States Foreign Intelligence Surveillance Court of Review; 1985–1992	Succeeded by Bobby Baldock
