= United States District Court for the District of Maryland =

United States district court

Coordinates: 39°17′13″N 76°37′2″W

- (D. Md.)

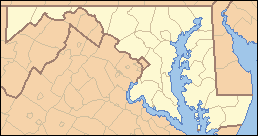
- Location: Edward A. Garmatz U.S. Courthouse (Baltimore) More locations: Greenbelt; Maude R. Toulson Federal Building (Salisbury); Cumberland; Denton
- Appeals to: Fourth Circuit
- Established: September 24, 1789
- Judges: 10
- Chief Judge: George L. Russell III

Officers of the court
- U.S. Attorney: Kelly O. Hayes
- U.S. Marshal: Johnny L. Hughes
- www.mdd.uscourts.gov

The United States District Court for the District of Maryland (in case citations, D. Md.) is the federal district court whose jurisdiction is the state of Maryland. Appeals from the District of Maryland are taken to the United States Court of Appeals for the Fourth Circuit (except for patent claims and claims against the U.S. government under the Tucker Act, which are appealed to the Federal Circuit).

Notable past judges of this district include William Paca, a signer of the United States Declaration of Independence. The United States Attorney for the District of Maryland represents the United States in civil and criminal litigation in the court. As of June 25, 2025, the U.S. attorney is Kelly O. Hayes.

== Organization of the court ==
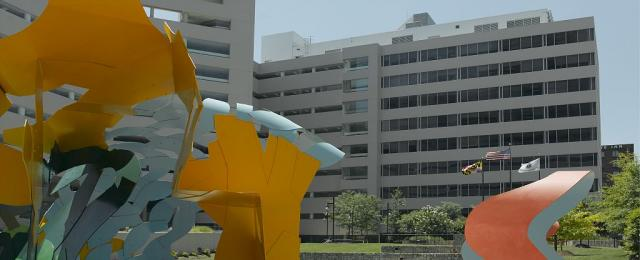
View of U.S. District Court for Maryland, Northern Division, in Baltimore, Maryland.

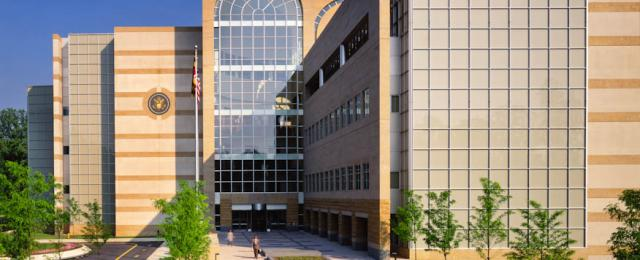
View of U.S. District Court for Maryland, Southern Division, in Greenbelt, Maryland.

Under 28 U.S.C. § 100, Maryland consists of a single federal judicial district with two statutory divisions.

=== Northern Division ===
The Northern Division includes Allegany, Anne Arundel, Baltimore, Caroline, Carroll, Cecil, Dorchester, Frederick, Garrett, Harford, Howard, Kent, Queen Anne's, Somerset, Talbot, Washington, Wicomico, Worcester counties and the City of Baltimore, is located in Baltimore, while the statute also provides for the court to sit in Cumberland and Denton. The Court also maintains a location in Salisbury, Maryland that is only staffed on days when court is in session.

=== Southern Division ===
The Southern Division includes Calvert, Charles, Montgomery, Prince George's, and St. Mary's counties and sits in Greenbelt.

== Current judges ==
As of March 4, 2026:

#	Title	Judge	Duty station	Born	Term of service			Appointed by
#	Title	Judge	Duty station	Born	Active	Chief	Senior	Appointed by
45	Chief Judge	George L. Russell III	Baltimore	1965	2012–present	2024–present	—	Obama
47	District Judge	Theodore D. Chuang	Greenbelt	1969	2014–present	—	—	Obama
49	District Judge	Paula Xinis	Greenbelt	1968	2016–present	—	—	Obama
50	District Judge	Stephanie A. Gallagher	Baltimore	1972	2019–present	—	—	Trump
51	District Judge	Deborah Boardman	Greenbelt	1974	2021–present	—	—	Biden
52	District Judge	Lydia Griggsby	Greenbelt	1968	2021–present	—	—	Biden
53	District Judge	Julie Rubin	Baltimore	1972	2022–present	—	—	Biden
54	District Judge	Brendan Hurson	Baltimore	1977	2023–present	—	—	Biden
55	District Judge	Matthew J. Maddox	Baltimore	1977	2023–present	—	—	Biden
56	District Judge	Adam B. Abelson	Baltimore	1982	2024–present	—	—	Biden
33	Senior Judge	William M. Nickerson	inactive	1933	1990–2002	—	2002–present	G.H.W. Bush
35	Senior Judge	Deborah K. Chasanow	Greenbelt	1948	1993–2014	2010–2014	2014–present	Clinton
41	Senior Judge	Richard D. Bennett	Baltimore	1947	2003–2021	—	2021–present	G.W. Bush
43	Senior Judge	James K. Bredar	Baltimore	1957	2010–2024	2017–2024	2024–present	Obama
44	Senior Judge	Ellen Lipton Hollander	Baltimore	1949	2010–2022	—	2022–present	Obama

== Former judges ==
#	Judge	Born–died	Active service	Chief Judge	Senior status	Appointed by	Reason for termination
1	William Paca	1740–1799	1789–1799 (Note: Recess appointment; formally nominated on February 8, 1790, confirmed by the United States Senate on February 10, 1790, and received commission the same day.)	—	—	Washington	death
2	James Winchester	1772–1806	1799–1806	—	—	J. Adams	death
3	James Houston	1767–1819	1806–1819	—	—	Jefferson	death
4	Theodorick Bland	1776–1846	1819–1824 (Note: Recess appointment; formally nominated on January 3, 1820, confirmed by the Senate on January 5, 1820, and received commission the same day.)	—	—	Monroe	resignation
5	Elias Glenn	1769–1846	1824–1836 (Note: Recess appointment; formally nominated on December 16, 1824, confirmed by the Senate on January 3, 1825, and received commission the same day.)	—	—	Monroe	resignation
6	Upton Scott Heath	1784–1852	1836–1852	—	—	Jackson	death
7	John Glenn	1795–1853	1852–1853	—	—	Fillmore	death
8	William Fell Giles	1807–1879	1853–1879 (Note: Recess appointment; formally nominated on December 19, 1853, confirmed by the Senate on January 11, 1854, and received commission the same day.)	—	—	Pierce	death
9	Thomas John Morris	1837–1912	1879–1912	—	—	Hayes	death
10	John Carter Rose	1861–1927	1910–1922	—	—	Taft	elevation
11	Morris Ames Soper	1873–1963	1923–1931	—	—	Harding	elevation
12	William Caldwell Coleman	1884–1968	1927–1955 (Note: Recess appointment; formally nominated on December 6, 1927, confirmed by the Senate on December 19, 1927, and received commission the same day.)	1948–1955	—	Coolidge	resignation
13	William Calvin Chesnut	1873–1962	1931–1953 (Note: Recess appointment; formally nominated on December 15, 1931, confirmed by the Senate on January 12, 1932, and received commission the same day.)	—	1953–1962	Hoover	death
14	Roszel Cathcart Thomsen	1900–1992	1954–1971	1955–1970	1971–1992	Eisenhower	death
15	Robert Dorsey Watkins	1900–1986	1955–1971 (Note: Recess appointment; formally nominated on January 12, 1956, confirmed by the Senate on March 1, 1956, and received commission on March 2, 1956.)	1970	1971–1986	Eisenhower	death
16	Edward Skottowe Northrop	1911–2003	1961–1981	1970–1981	1981–2003	Kennedy	death
17	Harrison Lee Winter	1921–1990	1961–1966 (Note: Recess appointment; formally nominated on January 15, 1962, confirmed by the Senate on February 7, 1962, and received commission on February 17, 1962.)	—	—	Kennedy	elevation
18	Frank Albert Kaufman	1916–1997	1966–1986	1981–1986	1986–1997	L. Johnson	death
19	Alexander Harvey II	1923–2017	1966–1991	1986–1991	1991–2017	L. Johnson	death
20	James Rogers Miller Jr.	1931–2014	1970–1986	—	—	Nixon	retirement
21	Charles Stanley Blair	1927–1980	1971–1980	—	—	Nixon	death
22	Herbert Frazier Murray	1923–1999	1971–1988	—	1988–1999	Nixon	death
23	Joseph H. Young	1922–2015	1971–1987	—	1987–2015	Nixon	death
24	Joseph C. Howard Sr.	1922–2000	1979–1991	—	1991–2000	Carter	death
25	Shirley Brannock Jones	1925–2019	1979–1982	—	—	Carter	resignation
26	Norman Park Ramsey	1922–1993	1980–1991	—	1991–1992	Carter	retirement
27	Walter Evan Black Jr.	1926–2014	1982–1994	1991–1994	1994–2014	Reagan	death
28	John R. Hargrove Sr.	1923–1997	1984–1994	—	1994–1997	Reagan	death
29	J. Frederick Motz	1942–2023	1985–2010	1994–2001	2010–2023	Reagan	death
30	Frederic N. Smalkin	1946–present	1986–2003	2001–2003	2003–2011	Reagan	retirement
31	Paul V. Niemeyer	1941–present	1988–1990	—	—	Reagan	elevation
32	Marvin J. Garbis	1936–present	1989–2003	—	2003–2018	G.H.W. Bush	retirement
34	Benson Everett Legg	1947–present	1991–2012	2003–2010	2012–2013	G.H.W. Bush	retirement
36	Peter J. Messitte	1941–2025	1993–2008	—	2008–2025	Clinton	death
37	Alexander Williams Jr.	1948–present	1994–2013	—	2013–2014	Clinton	retirement
38	Catherine C. Blake	1950–2026	1995–2021	2014–2017	2021–2026	Clinton	death
39	Andre M. Davis	1949–present	1995–2009	—	—	Clinton	elevation
40	William D. Quarles Jr.	1948–present	2003–2016	—	—	G.W. Bush	retirement
42	Roger W. Titus	1941–2019	2003–2014	—	2014–2019	G.W. Bush	death
46	Paul W. Grimm	1951–present	2012–2022	—	2022	Obama	retirement
48	George J. Hazel	1975–present	2014–2023	—	—	Obama	resignation

== Chief judges ==
Chief judges have administrative responsibilities with respect to their district court. Unlike the Supreme Court, where one justice is specifically nominated to be chief, the office of chief judge rotates among the district court judges. To be chief, a judge must have been in active service on the court for at least one year, be under the age of 65, and have not previously served as chief judge.

A vacancy is filled by the judge highest in seniority among the group of qualified judges. The chief judge serves for a term of seven years, or until age 70, whichever occurs first. The age restrictions are waived if no members of the court would otherwise be qualified for the position.

When the office was created in 1948, the chief judge was the longest-serving judge who had not elected to retire, on what has since 1958 been known as senior status, or declined to serve as chief judge. After August 6, 1959, judges could not become or remain chief after turning 70 years old. The current rules have been in operation since October 1, 1982.

== Succession of seats ==
Seat 1
Seat established on September 24, 1789 by 1 Stat. 73
Paca	1790–1799
Winchester	1799–1806
Houston	1806–1819
Bland	1819–1824
E. Glenn	1824–1836
Heath	1836–1852
J. Glenn	1852–1853
Giles	1853–1879
Morris	1879–1912
Seat abolished on June 6, 1912 (temporary judgeship expired)

Seat 2
Seat established on February 24, 1910 by 36 Stat. 201 (temporary)
Seat became permanent upon the abolition of Seat 1 on June 6, 1912
Rose	1910–1922
Soper	1923–1931
Chesnut	1931–1953
Thomsen	1954–1971
Murray	1971–1988
Nickerson	1990–2002
Quarles, Jr.	2003–2016
Gallagher	2019–present

Seat 3
Seat established on March 3, 1927 by 44 Stat. 1346
Coleman	1927–1955
Watkins	1956–1971
Young	1971–1987
Garbis	1989–2003
Titus	2003–2014
Chuang	2014–present

Seat 4
Seat established on May 19, 1961 by 75 Stat. 80
Northrop	1961–1981
Black, Jr.	1982–1994
Davis	1995–2009
Hollander	2010–2022
Rubin	2022–present

Seat 5
Seat established on May 19, 1961 by 75 Stat. 80
Winter	1962–1966
Harvey II	1966–1991
Chasanow	1993–2014
Xinis	2016–present

Seat 6
Seat established on March 18, 1966 by 80 Stat. 75
Kaufman	1966–1986
Niemeyer	1988–1990
Legg	1991–2012
Grimm	2012–2022
Maddox	2023–present

Seat 7
Seat established on June 2, 1970 by 84 Stat. 294
Miller, Jr.	1970–1986
Smalkin	1986–2003
Bennett	2003–2021
Boardman	2021–present

Seat 8
Seat established on June 2, 1970 by 84 Stat. 294
Blair	1971–1980
Ramsey	1980–1991
Williams, Jr.	1994–2013
Hazel	2014–2023
Hurson	2023–present

Seat 9
Seat established on October 20, 1978 by 92 Stat. 1629
Howard, Sr.	1979–1991
Messitte	1993–2008
Russell III	2012–present

Seat 10
Seat established on October 20, 1978 by 92 Stat. 1629
Jones	1979–1982
Hargrove, Sr.	1984–1994
Blake	1995–2021
Griggsby	2021–present

Seat 11
Seat established on July 10, 1984 by 98 Stat. 333
Motz	1985–2010
Bredar	2010–2024
Abelson	2024–present

== U.S. Attorneys ==
- Richard Potts 1789–92
- Zebulon Hollingsworth 1792–1806
- John Stephen 1806–10
- Thomas B. Dorsey 1810–12
- Elias Glenn 1812–24
- Nathaniel Williams 1824–41
- Z. Collins Lee 1841–45
- William L. Marshall 1845–50
- Z. Collins Lee 1850–53
- William M. Addison 1853–62
- William Price 1862
- Archibald Sterling, Jr. 1878–86
- Thomas Gordon Hayes 1886–90
- John T. Ensor 1890–94
- William L. Marbury 1894–98
- John C. Rose 1898–1910
- John Philip Hill 1910–15
- Samuel K. Dennis 1915–20
- Robert R. Carman 1920–22
- Amos W. W. Woodcock 1927–31
- Simon E. Sobeloff 1931–34
- Bernard J. Flynn 1934–53
- George C. Doub 1953–56
- Walter E. Black, Jr. 1956–57
- Leon H. A. Pierson 1957–61
- Joseph D. Tydings 1961–63
- Robert H. Kernon 1963
- Thomas J. Kenney 1963–67
- Stephen H. Sachs 1967–70
- George Beall 1970–75
- Jervis S. Finney 1975–78
- Russell T. Baker 1978–81
- Herbert Better 1981
- J. Frederick Motz 1981–85
- Catherine C. Blake 1985–86
- Breckinridge L. Willcox 1986–91
- Richard D. Bennett 1991–93
- Gary P. Jordan 1993
- Lynne Ann Battaglia 1993–2001
- Stephen M. Schenning 2001
- Thomas M. DiBiagio 2001–2005
- Allen F. Loucks 2005
- Rod Rosenstein 2005–2017
- Stephen M. Schenning 2017–2018
- Robert Hur 2018–2021
- Erek Barron 2021–2025
- Phil Selden (acting) 2025
- Kelly O. Hayes 2025–

== See also ==
- Courts of Maryland
- List of current United States district judges
- List of United States federal courthouses in Maryland
