= Harrison Lee Winter =

American judge (1921–1990)

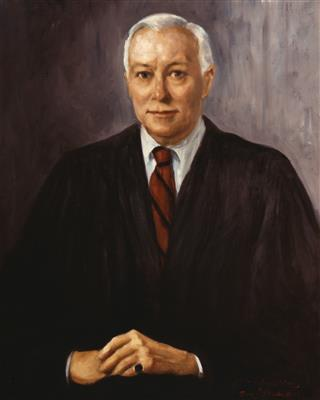

Senior Judge of the United States Court of Appeals for the Fourth Circuit
- In office January 1, 1990 – April 10, 1990

Chief Judge of the United States Court of Appeals for the Fourth Circuit
- In office 1981–1989
- Preceded by: Clement Haynsworth
- Succeeded by: Samuel James Ervin III

Judge of the United States Court of Appeals for the Fourth Circuit
- In office June 24, 1966 – January 1, 1990
- Appointed by: Lyndon B. Johnson
- Preceded by: Seat established by 80 Stat. 75
- Succeeded by: Paul V. Niemeyer

Judge of the United States District Court for the District of Maryland
- In office November 9, 1961 – June 27, 1966
- Appointed by: John F. Kennedy
- Preceded by: Seat established by 75 Stat. 80
- Succeeded by: Alexander Harvey II

Personal details
- Born: Harrison Lee Winter; April 18, 1921 Baltimore, Maryland, U.S.
- Died: April 10, 1990 (aged 68) Baltimore, Maryland, U.S.
- Education: Johns Hopkins University (AB); University of Maryland School of Law (LLB)

Harrison Lee Winter (April 18, 1921 – April 10, 1990) was a United States circuit judge of the United States Court of Appeals for the Fourth Circuit and previously was a United States district judge of the United States District Court for the District of Maryland.

== Education and career ==
Born in Baltimore, Maryland, Winter received an Artium Baccalaureus degree from Johns Hopkins University in 1942 and a Bachelor of Laws from the University of Maryland School of Law in 1944. He was in private practice in Baltimore from 1945 to 1959. During this time, he was an assistant attorney general of the State of Maryland from 1948 to 1951, and a deputy attorney general from 1954 to 1955. He was a city solicitor for Baltimore from 1959 to 1961.

== Federal judicial service ==
On November 9, 1961, Winter received a recess appointment from President John F. Kennedy to a new seat on the United States District Court for the District of Maryland created by 75 Stat. 80. Formally nominated on January 15, 1962, he was confirmed by the United States Senate on February 7, 1962, and received his commission on February 17, 1962. His service terminated on June 27, 1966, due to elevation to the Fourth Circuit.

On June 13, 1966, Winter was nominated by President Lyndon B. Johnson to a new seat on the United States Court of Appeals for the Fourth Circuit created by 80 Stat. 75. Winter was confirmed by the Senate on June 24, 1966, and received his commission the same day. He served both as Chief Judge and as a member of the Judicial Conference of the United States from 1981 to 1989, assuming senior status on January 1, 1990. Winter served in that capacity until his death on April 10, 1990, in Baltimore.

== Sources ==
Legal offices
Preceded by Seat established by 75 Stat. 80	Judge of the United States District Court for the District of Maryland; 1962–1966	Succeeded by Alexander Harvey II
Preceded by Seat established by 80 Stat. 75	Judge of the United States Court of Appeals for the Fourth Circuit; 1966–1990	Succeeded by Paul V. Niemeyer
Preceded by Clement Haynsworth	Chief Judge of the United States Court of Appeals for the Fourth Circuit; 1981–1989	Succeeded by Samuel James Ervin III
