= Peace Cross =

War memorial in Bladensburg, Maryland, United States

- U.S. National Register of Historic Places
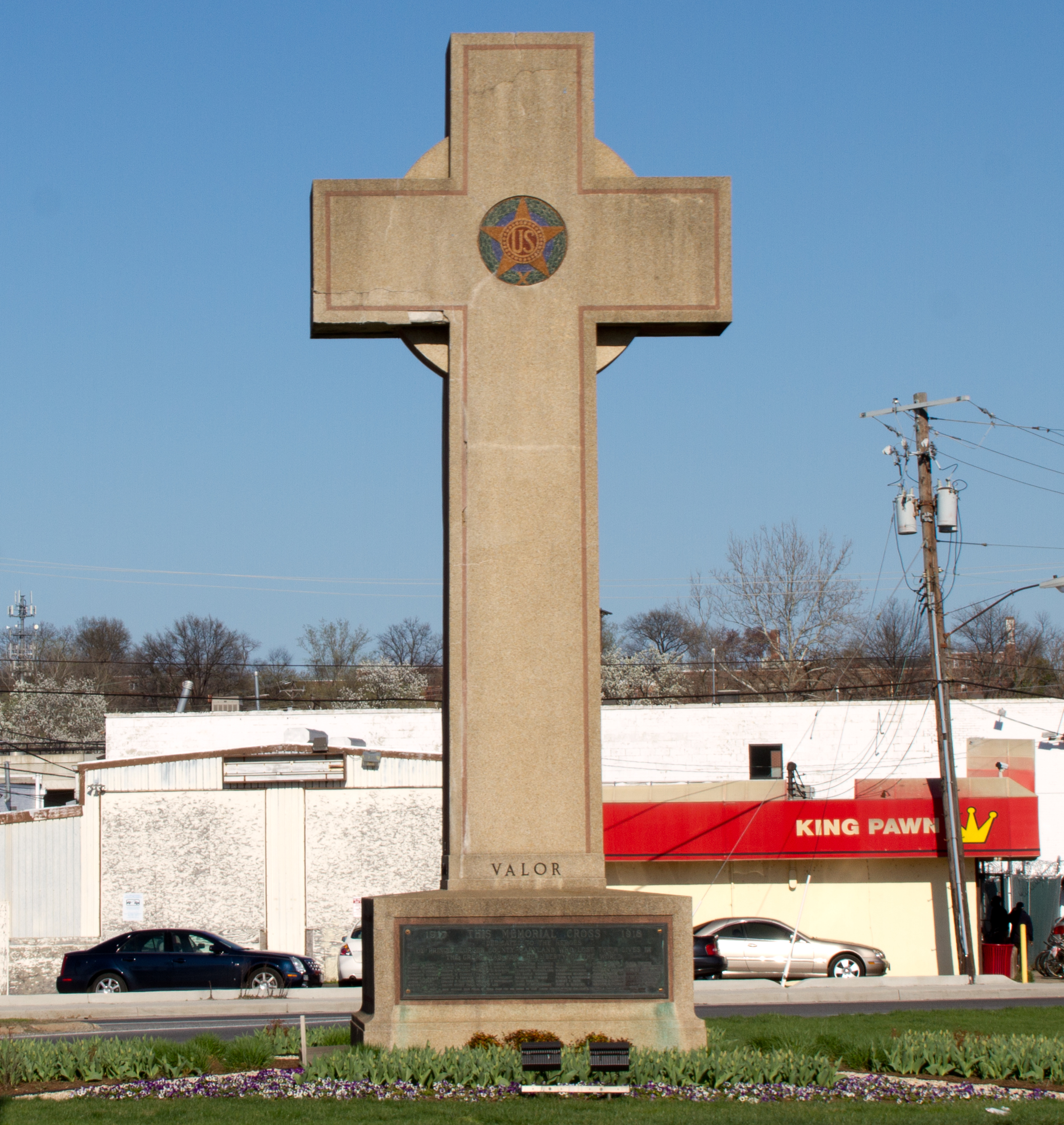

- Location within Maryland Location within the United States
- Location: Annapolis Rd. & Baltimore Ave., Bladensburg, Maryland
- Coordinates: 38°56′22″N 76°56′27″W
- Area: less than one acre
- Built: 1919–1925
- Architect: Earley, John J.
- NRHP reference No.: 15000572
- Added to NRHP: September 8, 2015

The Peace Cross is a World War I memorial located in Bladensburg, Maryland. Standing 40 feet (12 m) in height, the large cross is made of tan concrete with exposed pink granite aggregate; the arms of the cross are supported by unadorned concrete arches. Erected by 1925 in the memory of 49 local servicemen from Prince George's County who died during World War I, the base of the cross displays the words "valor," "endurance," "courage," and "devotion" as well as a bronze tablet listing the names of those lost in combat.

The memorial was originally commissioned by the American Legion, but since turned over to be maintained by a commission within Maryland. This created an apparent conflict with the separation of church and state, and led to the Supreme Court case American Legion v. American Humanist Association in 2019 which decided the monument was built for secular purposes and had historical importance beyond the Christian symbolism, so there was no conflict for the state to maintain the monument.

== History ==
The American Legion commissioned the cross to commemorate the 49 servicemen that died overseas in World War I. The monument was designed by Washington, D.C. architect and artist John Joseph Earley, and was erected between 1919 and 1925. The Latin cross design was selected as it mirrored the Christian cross structures used on the gravesites of soldiers buried after the war in Europe and other locations. United States Secretary of the Navy Josephus Daniels spoke at the monument's groundbreaking ceremony in September 1919, with a formal dedication ceremony in July 1925.

The "Peace Cross" moniker was previously used in the Washington, D.C., area in 1898 for a twenty-foot-tall cross erected on the grounds of Washington National Cathedral to mark the end of the Spanish–American War.

In addition to the names of 49 servicemen, the bronze plaque on the cross features a quote from Woodrow Wilson: "The right is more precious than peace. We shall fight for the things we have always carried nearest our hearts. To such a task we dedicate our lives."

The cross was originally built on private lands, but the lands were turned over to the state's Maryland-National Capital Park and Planning Commission in 1961. The Commission has since overseen maintenance of the memorial. The land has been heavily developed over the years, with a divided highway passing by it and the memorial on its median. The Commission installed nighttime illumination to avoid this becoming a safety hazard. Additional war memorial structures have been erected in a grassy area across Bladensburg Road from the memorial, creating the Bladensburg Memorial Grove Park.

The memorial was listed on the National Register of Historic Places in 2015.

Work began in 2021 to restore the cross and the renovated memorial was rededicated in a ceremony on Veterans Day 2022. The restoration was estimated to cost about $1 million with the Park and Planning Commission seeking private donations to help cover the costs.

== Legal challenge ==
In October 2017, the Fourth Circuit Court of Appeals ruled that publicly funded maintenance of the cross was unconstitutional because it "excessively entangles the government in religion because the cross is the core symbol of Christianity and breaches the wall separating church and state."

On June 20, 2019, in the case of American Legion v. American Humanist Association, the Supreme Court of the United States ruled in favor of keeping the Peace Cross on public land, by the reason that it does not violate the Establishment Clause of the U.S. Constitution.

== See also ==
- National Register of Historic Places listings in Prince George's County, Maryland
