= 46th G7 summit =

Canceled summit by heads of state

- Host country: United States (canceled)
- Date: 10–12 June 2020 (canceled)
- Cities: Thurmont (canceled)
- Venues: Camp David (canceled)
- Participants: Canada; France; Germany; Italy; Japan; United Kingdom; United States; European Union
- Follows: 45th G7 summit
- Precedes: 47th G7 summit

The 46th G7 summit of the leaders of the Group of Seven was originally scheduled for June 10–12, 2020, at Camp David, United States. However, the summit was cancelled due to the COVID-19 pandemic.

== Planned venue ==
=== Attempt to hold summit at Trump resort ===
The choice of the summit's location was controversial. The Secret Service initially vetted ten sites for the summit and reduced that list to four (in Hawaii, Utah, California, and North Carolina). They then eliminated the California and North Carolina sites, and added, at President Donald Trump's direction, the option of hosting at Trump National Doral in Miami.

On October 17, 2019, Trump's acting White House Chief of Staff Mick Mulvaney announced the summit would be held at the Trump National Doral, dismissing concerns about potential conflict of interests and the prospect of a president personally profiting from an official event. Trump initially touted the benefits of using his resort for the conference and called the selection "something very good for our Country" but, two days later, after bipartisan criticism, announced that the G7 summit would no longer be held at Doral, blaming "Media & Democrat Crazed and Irrational Hostility" on his Twitter account.

At the time of the announcement, Trump was the target of two lawsuits—D.C. and Maryland v. Trump and CREW v. Trump—alleging that he was violating the US Constitution's foreign and domestic emoluments clauses because of payments received from the Saudi government and other foreign governments for stays at his Trump International Hotel in Washington, D.C. Legal experts debated whether hosting the G7 at a Trump-owned property would violate the Constitution's emoluments clauses.

=== Selection of Camp David ===
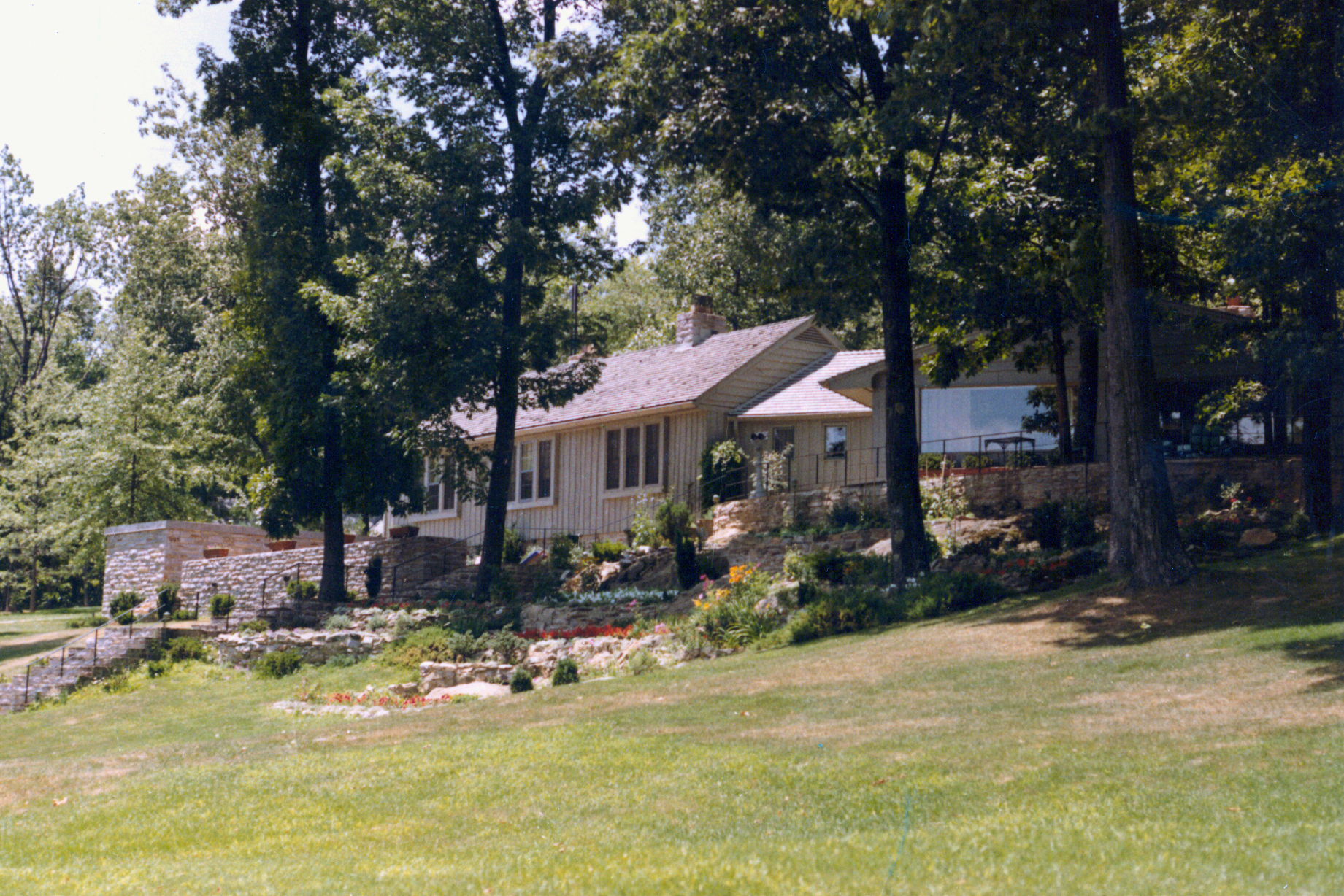
A Lodge at Camp David photographed in 1959

On December 3, 2019, it was announced that the summit would be held at Camp David, the country retreat of the President of the United States. The same venue hosted the group's 38th summit in 2012.

== Postponements and cancellation ==
In response to the coronavirus pandemic, Trump canceled the G7 at Camp David and said that the meeting would be conducted by video conference, as in the case of a G7 session held on 16 April 2020. Later, however, Trump suggested that the G7 could be held in person at the White House or Camp David. In late May 2020, German Chancellor Angela Merkel declined Trump's invitation to attend a G7 summit in late June, citing the ongoing pandemic. French President Emmanuel Macron, who is closely aligned with Merkel, made a phone call to Trump stating that the entire G7 should be present in person at a summit. British Prime Minister Boris Johnson also suggested that he favored an in-person gathering. On May 30, 2020, Trump delayed the summit until at least September 2020.

In August 2020, Trump said that he wanted to delay the summit until after the November 2020 election. No summit took place subsequently.

== Invitees ==
Trump named India, Australia, Brazil, South Korea, and Russia as potential invitees to the summit, and said "I don't feel that as a G7 it properly represents what's going on in the world. It's a very outdated group of countries." Trump's aides said that China would be a subject of G7+ discussions, but not a part of it, and said that Trump intended to use the summit to build an anti-China bloc.

In calls with Trump in early June 2020, invitations to join the summit were accepted by Australian Prime Minister Scott Morrison, Brazilian President Jair Bolsonaro, South Korean President Moon Jae-in, and Indian Prime Minister Narendra Modi.

=== Trump's proposed invitation to Russian President Vladimir Putin ===
On June 2, 2020, Trump initiated a call with Russian President Vladimir Putin offering to invite him to the G7 meeting. However, Trump's proposal to invite Putin was staunchly opposed by the UK and Canada. Canadian Prime Minister Justin Trudeau said that Russia's "continued disrespect and flaunting of international rules and norms is why it remains outside of the G7 and why it will continue to remain out" and a spokesman for the British government said that Russia should not be readmitted to the group "unless it ceases aggressive and destabilizing activity that threatens the safety of UK citizens and the collective security of our allies."

The European Union agreed that Russia should not be readmitted to the G7, with EU chief diplomat Josep Borrell, the High Representative of the EU for Foreign Affairs and Security Policy, explaining that Trump did not have the unilateral power to change the permanent membership of the G7 or its scope: "The prerogative of the G7 chair, in this case the United States, is to issue guest invitations -- guest invitations reflect the host's priorities. But changing membership, changing the format on a permanent basis, is not a prerogative of the G7 chair."

On August 10, 2020, Trump said that he had not decided whether to invite Putin, but this eventually became a moot point as the summit did not proceed.

== Participants ==
The planned 46th G7 summit would have been the final summit for Japanese Prime Minister Shinzō Abe and Italian Prime Minister Giuseppe Conte. However, it was ultimately cancelled due to the COVID-19 pandemic. Abe handed over power to Yoshihide Suga on September 16, 2020 and Conte handed over power to Mario Draghi on February 13, 2021.

Participants would have included the leaders of the G7 member states as well as representatives of the European Union. The President of the European Commission had been a permanently welcome participant, not a nation member per se, at all meetings and decision-making since 1981.

**Core G7 members** Hosting member shown in bold text.
Member		Represented by	Title
(Canada)	Canada	Justin Trudeau	Prime Minister
(France)	France	Emmanuel Macron	President
(Germany)	Germany	Angela Merkel	Chancellor
(Italy)	Italy	Giuseppe Conte	Prime Minister
(Japan)	Japan	Shinzo Abe	Prime Minister
(United Kingdom)	United Kingdom	Boris Johnson	Prime Minister
(United States)	**United States**	**Donald Trump**	**President**
(European Union)	European Union	Ursula von der Leyen	Commission President
(European Union)	European Union	Charles Michel	Council President
**Invitees**
Guest		Represented by	Title
(Australia)	Australia	Scott Morrison	Prime Minister
(Brazil)	Brazil	Jair Bolsonaro	President
(India)	India	Narendra Modi	Prime Minister
(South Korea)	South Korea	Moon Jae-in	President

== Agenda ==
=== Climate change ===
Trump did not take part in the climate change mitigation discussions during the 44th meetings held in Canada or the 45th meetings held in France. When the administration announced that the 46th meetings were to be held at the Trump property in Florida, Trump's acting White House Chief of Staff Mulvaney said, "climate change will not be on the agenda."
