= CREW and National Security Archive v. Trump and EOP =

Responsibility and Ethics in Washington (CREW)

- Court: United States District Court for the District of Columbia
- Full case name: Citizens for Responsibility and Ethics in Washington and National Security Archive v. Donald J. Trump, in his official capacity as President of the United States of America and the Executive Office of the President
- Decided: Pending (filed June 22, 2017)
- Defendants: Donald Trump in his capacity as President; Executive Office of the President
- Counsel for plaintiffs: George M. Clarke III; Mireille R. Oldak; Anne L. Weismann; Angela C. Vigil; Conor M. Shaw
- Plaintiffs: Citizens for Responsibility and Ethics in Washington; National Security Archive
- Citation: No. 1:17-cv-01228

Court membership
- Judge sitting: Christopher R. Cooper

Citizens for Responsibility and Ethics in Washington and National Security Archive v. Trump and EOP, No. 1:17-cv-01228 (D.D.C. 2017), is a case pending before the United States District Court for the District of Columbia. The plaintiffs, the watchdog group Citizens for Responsibility and Ethics in Washington (CREW) and the archivist National Security Archive, allege that the defendants, President Donald Trump and elements of the Executive Office of the President, are in violation of the Presidential Records Act by deleting electronic messages on Twitter and using other electronic messaging applications without required archival records.

== Background ==
Citizens for Responsibility and Ethics in Washington (CREW) had previously filed an emoluments case against the president, CREW v. Trump, where they alleged the President had been in violation of the constitution since the inauguration. The National Security Archive at George Washington University is a repository of declassified U.S. documents outside of the federal government. CREW and the National Security Archive are represented in this suit by both CREW staff lawyers and external counsel from the multinational law firm Baker McKenzie. The United States Department of Justice represents Trump.

President Trump had used Twitter as a communication medium during his campaign and during his tenure as president, including tweets on inauguration day. CREW contends that deletion of tweets is the destruction of presidential records in violation of the Presidential Records Act of 1981.

According to the text of the complaint:

This is a civil action for declaratory, injunctive, and mandamus relief brought under the Presidential Records Act, 44 U.S.C. §§ 2201–2209 (“PRA”); the Declaratory Judgment Act, 28 U.S.C. §§ 2201 and 2202; and Article II, Section 3 of the Constitution, which imposes on the President a duty to “take care that the laws be faithfully executed,” challenging actions of the President, his staff, and the Executive Office of the President (“EOP”) (collectively, the “Defendants”) that seek to evade transparency and government accountability.

== Specific allegations ==
- Trump deleted tweets in violation of the Presidential Records Act of 1981.
- The White House used encrypted and auto-deleting messaging applications which CREW alleges interferes with other federal agencies from fulfilling their obligations.

== Opinion ==
The District Court ruled in favor of the Trump Administration, stating that the plaintiffs had failed to a clear and indisputable harm that merited the requested writ of mandamus. Thus, the case was dismissed and the administration was not required to restore the deleted communications. The plaintiffs appealed this decision, but the Court of Appeals for the D.C. Circuit affirmed the district court's ruling.

== See also ==
- CREW v. Trump
- D.C. and Maryland v. Trump
- Blumenthal v. Trump
- List of lawsuits involving Donald Trump
- Presidential Records Act
- Freedom of Information Act
