= Peter J. Messitte =

American judge (1941–2025)

Peter Jo Messitte
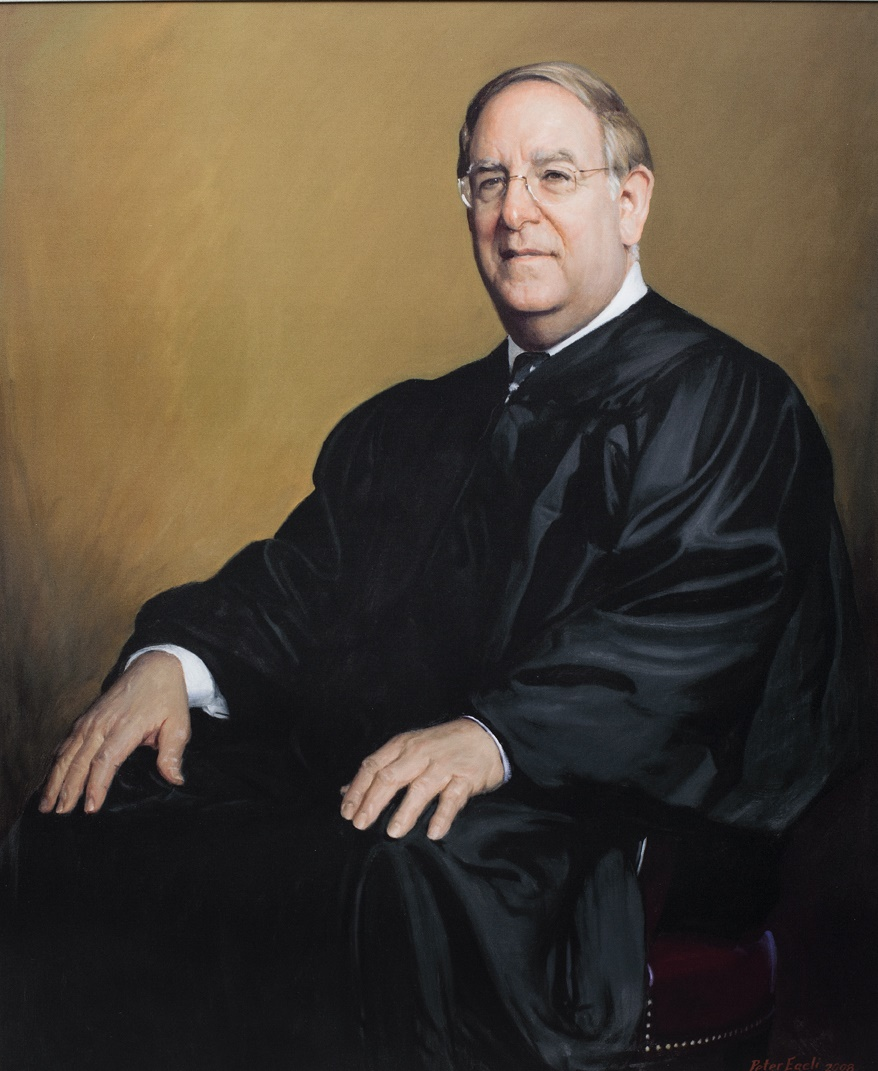

Senior Judge of the United States District Court for the District of Maryland
- In office September 1, 2008 – January 11, 2025

Judge of the United States District Court for the District of Maryland
- In office October 20, 1993 – September 1, 2008
- Appointed by: Bill Clinton
- Preceded by: Joseph C. Howard Sr.
- Succeeded by: George L. Russell III

Personal details
- Pronunciation: Mess-et-ti
- Born: Peter Jo Messitte; July 17, 1941 Washington, D.C., U.S.
- Died: January 11, 2025 (aged 83) Chevy Chase, Maryland, U.S.
- Education: Amherst College (BA); University of Chicago (JD)

Peter Jo Messitte (July 17, 1941 – January 11, 2025) was an American lawyer and jurist who served as a United States district judge of the United States District Court for the District of Maryland from October 1993 until his death in January 2025.

== Background ==
Messitte was born on July 17, 1941, in Washington, D.C. He graduated in 1959 from Bethesda-Chevy Chase High School and was greatly influenced by John F. Kennedy's speech to his graduating class. Messitte received a Bachelor of Arts degree from Amherst College in 1963 and a J.D. degree from the University of Chicago Law School in 1966.

Messitte died on January 11, 2025, at the age of 83.

== Peace Corps service and legal career ==
Messitte was a Peace Corps volunteer in São Paulo, Brazil, from 1966 to 1968. He was in private practice in Washington, D.C., from 1969 to 1971. He was in private practice in Chevy Chase, Maryland, from 1971 to 1985.

== Judicial career ==
=== State judicial service ===
In 1982, after sixteen years in private law practice, Messitte ran for a seat on the Maryland Circuit Court for Montgomery County; he lost the race, but Governor Harry R. Hughes appointed him to the court in 1985. He served on the bench until he was appointed to the federal bench in 1993. On the state court, Messitte issued an order in 1989 that temporarily halted a shopping mall proposal in Silver Spring. He also presided over the bench trial of Montgomery County police officer Christopher J. Albrecht, who was convicted of involuntary manslaughter. Messitte also wrote many articles on the impact of AIDS on the criminal justice system, and participated in a reform of Maryland's adoption laws.

=== Federal judicial service ===
On August 6, 1993, Messitte was nominated by President Bill Clinton to a seat on the United States District Court for the District of Maryland vacated by Joseph C. Howard, Sr. Messitte was confirmed by the United States Senate on October 18, 1993, and received his commission two days later. He assumed senior status on September 1, 2008. His service was terminated after he died from a short illness on January 11, 2025.

=== Notable rulings ===
In 2001, Messitte sentenced Dustin John Higgs to die, making him the first person sentenced to death in federal court in Maryland. Higgs ordered the 1996 murders of three women on an isolated road in Beltsville, on federal land. Higgs was executed in 2020, by which time capital punishment had been abolished in Maryland state law.

In 2014, in a trademark case brought by Barrett Green against the Washington Redskins (Green v. Pro Football, Inc. d/b/a The Washington Redskins), Messitte banned the use of the controversial slur "Redskins") in his courtroom and in court documents, "unless reference is made to a direct quote where the name appears."

In 2018, in the case D.C. and Maryland v. Trump, Messitte denied Donald Trump's motion to dismiss a lawsuit brought by Maryland and the District of Columbia against Trump alleging violation of the Domestic Emoluments Clause and Foreign Emoluments Clause of the U.S. Constitution. A three-judge panel of the U.S. Court of Appeals for the Fourth Circuit dismissed the case in July 2019, with the panel ruling that the Maryland and D.C. attorneys general lacked legal standing to sue. All three judges were appointed by Republican presidents. However, the full court vacated the panel decision, and voted to rehear the appeal en banc. In a May 2020 decision, the full Fourth Circuit rejected Trump's attempt to have the case dismissed on the grounds of "presidential immunity" by a 9-to-6 majority, reviving the lawsuit.

Messitte was assigned to preside over a challenge to the Purple Line (a light rail line to be built in Maryland), but he recused himself in 2020 because his home is near a future Purple Line station.

In HIAS Inc. v. Trump (2020), Messitte issued a nationwide preliminary injunction blocking Trump's executive order that required refugee-resettlement organizations to obtain letters of consent from states and local jurisdictions before settling refugees. Ruling in favor of Church World Service, Lutheran Immigration and Refugee Service, and HIAS, Messitte found that giving governors and other state and local officials "the power to veto where refugees may be resettled" contravened the Refugee Act of 1980's text, structure, purpose, and congressional intent, and also was a likely violation of the Administrative Procedure Act. Messitte also ruled that the executive order "does not appear to serve the overall public interest" but "granting the preliminary injunctive relief Plaintiffs seek does." The Fourth Circuit affirmed Messitte's order.

=== Other activities ===
Messitte spent decades working on judicial reform activities internationally, principally in Brazil, but also in other Latin American countries and in Turkey, Thailand, and Yemen. He spoke Spanish and Portuguese. He served as a special advisor (and former member) of the ABA Rule of Law Initiative's Latin America and Caribbean Division. He was the director of the Brazil-U.S. Legal & Judicial Studies Program at the American University Washington College of Law.

Messitte's work in Brazil emphasized the need for independence of the judiciary and other factors, such as strong judicial recruitment and training, fairly applying the law, and granting sufficient funding and other resources to the judiciary. During Brazil's transition to democracy, Messitte helped Brazil as it established discretionary review and binding precedent for its courts. Brazil has honored Messitte for his work with the nation's judiciary: he was made an honorary citizen of São Paulo and in June 2017 was awarded the Order of the Southern Cross (the nation's highest award open for foreigners) by Brazilian President Michel Temer at a ceremony in the Presidential Palace of Brasília.

== Sources ==
Legal offices
Preceded by Joseph C. Howard Sr.	Judge of the United States District Court for the District of Maryland; 1993–2008	Succeeded by George L. Russell III
