= Joseph C. Howard Sr. =

American judge (1922–2000)

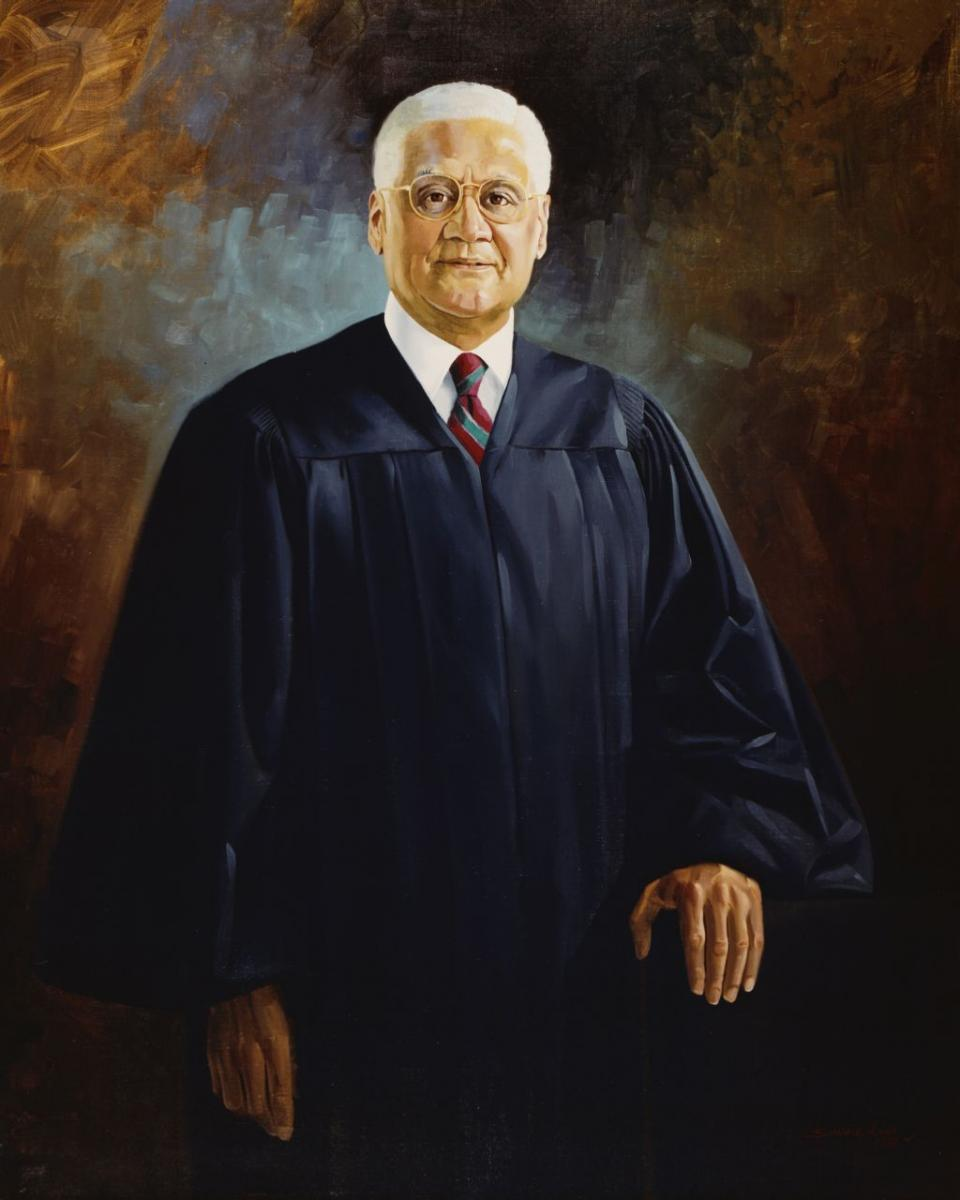

Senior Judge of the United States District Court for the District of Maryland
- In office November 15, 1991 – September 16, 2000

Judge of the United States District Court for the District of Maryland
- In office October 5, 1979 – November 15, 1991
- Appointed by: Jimmy Carter
- Preceded by: Seat established by 92 Stat. 1629
- Succeeded by: Peter J. Messitte

Associate Judge of the Supreme Bench of Baltimore City
- In office 1968–1979

Personal details
- Born: Joseph Clemens Howard; December 9, 1922 Des Moines, Iowa, U.S.
- Died: September 16, 2000 (aged 77) Pikesville, Maryland, U.S.
- Party: Democratic
- Education: University of Iowa (BA); Morgan State University; Drake University (MA, LLB, JD)

Joseph Clemens Howard Sr. (December 9, 1922 – September 16, 2000) was the first African American to win an election as judge for the Baltimore City Supreme Bench and was later appointed by President Jimmy Carter to be a United States district judge of the United States District Court for the District of Maryland, becoming the first African American to serve on that bench as well.

== Early life ==
Howard was born to Charles Preston Howard and Maude L. (Lewis) Howard in Des Moines, Iowa. His parents were African-American. His father, a friend of civil rights leader Dr. Ralph Bunche, was a native of South Carolina, his mother has been described as Native American (Sioux). but was actually a daughter of Thomas D. Lewis (1846–1909) and Mary Adeline Tann (1855–1939) of Fayette, Iowa, both members of a farming colony of free people of color that settled in Northeast Iowa in 1853. Joseph's grandfather Lewis had the distinction of being a private in the 38th Regiment USCT, one of four USCT units that were the first US troops to march into Richmond, Virginia when it fell in April 1865. Joseph's great-uncle Theodore Wright Lewis (1853–1922), an AME pastor who served churches in Iowa, Illinois and Kansas was one of the founding members of the NAACP in the Davenport, Iowa and Rock Island, Illinois area. His father was a lawyer and one of the original founders of the National Bar Association, an association of African-American attorneys.

Howard served in the U.S. Army from 1944 to 1946. During World War II, he commanded Filipino troops and ran a Japanese prisoner-of-war camp. He was honorably discharged with the rank of Captain.

Howard was a probation officer with the Supreme Bench of Baltimore, Maryland from 1958 to 1960.

== Education ==
After his discharge, Howard resumed his education at the University of Iowa and graduated in 1950 with a Bachelor of Arts degree. Prior to the war, Howard had tried out for and made the football team; he was the only black player on the team. During a 1944 game against the Indiana University, his coach yelled out to the Iowa defense: "We gotta stop that nigger", referring to the opposing team's running back. Howard immediately walked up to his coach and asked him to apologize; he didn't, and Howard quit the team. Later at the Drake University Law School, he became the first African-American student admitted to the Phi Alpha Delta legal fraternity. He earned his Bachelor of Laws in 1955 and was married to Gwendolyn Mae London that same year. Howard received a Master of Arts from Drake University in 1957 and a Juris Doctor from Drake University Law School in 1968.

== Law practice ==
In 1959, after they moved to Baltimore, Maryland, Howard passed the Maryland bar exam and then started a law firm (Howard & Hargrove) with his brother, Charles P. Howard, and John R. Hargrove Sr. (who also went on to become a U.S. district judge). In 1964, Howard became assistant state's attorney in Baltimore and later became the first African-American chief of the trial section of the state's attorney's office. Two years into the job, Howard criticized his superiors and Baltimore police for pursuing harsher penalties against alleged black rapists when the victims were white than the penalties they sought when the victims were black. Howard was ordered to issue a report to back up his allegations. In the report he cited that 30 black men had been executed for raping white woman, but no one, black or white, had been executed for raping a black woman. In 1967, he became assistant city solicitor.

== State judicial service ==
Prior to 1968, vacancies on the Supreme Bench of Baltimore City were filled by the Governor of Maryland with white males and usually confirmed by the voters of Baltimore. In 1968, 81 of the 82 judges on Maryland's appellate and circuit courts where white males. Maryland governors had been slow to appoint blacks to the bench, even though the city was majority African American. Howard challenged the system and ran for judge without the blessings of the governor. He won by 8,000 votes over his nearest competitor, and became the first African-American to run for and win a seat on that bench. As a judge, he challenged the racial hiring practices of the supreme bench and helped racially diversify the offices and employ minorities at the circuit court as well.

== Federal judicial service ==
Howard was nominated by President Jimmy Carter on May 22, 1979, to the United States District Court for the District of Maryland, to a new seat created by 92 Stat. 1629. He was confirmed by the United States Senate on October 4, 1979, and received his commission on October 5, 1979, becoming the first African-American judge of the District of Maryland. He assumed senior status on November 15, 1991. His service was terminated on September 16, 2000, due to his death.

== Death ==
In 1992, after Howard was diagnosed with Shy–Drager syndrome, a progressive failure of the autonomic nervous system, he took a reduced case load. Howard died on September 16, 2000, in Pikesville, Maryland at the age of 77. His funeral was held the following Friday at the Union Baptist Church in Baltimore.

== Written works ==
- "Administration of Rape Cases in the City of Baltimore and the State of Maryland" (1968)
- "Why We Organize," Journal of Public Law (1971)
- "Employment Practices in the Administration of Justice Under the Supreme Bench of Baltimore City," (1975)
- "Racial Discrimination in Sentencing," Judicature (1975)

== See also ==
- List of African-American federal judges
- List of African-American jurists
- List of first minority male lawyers and judges in Georgia

Legal offices
Preceded by Seat established by 92 Stat. 1629	Judge of the United States District Court for the District of Maryland; 1979–1991	Succeeded by Peter J. Messitte
