= 45th G7 summit =

2019 international leader meeting in France

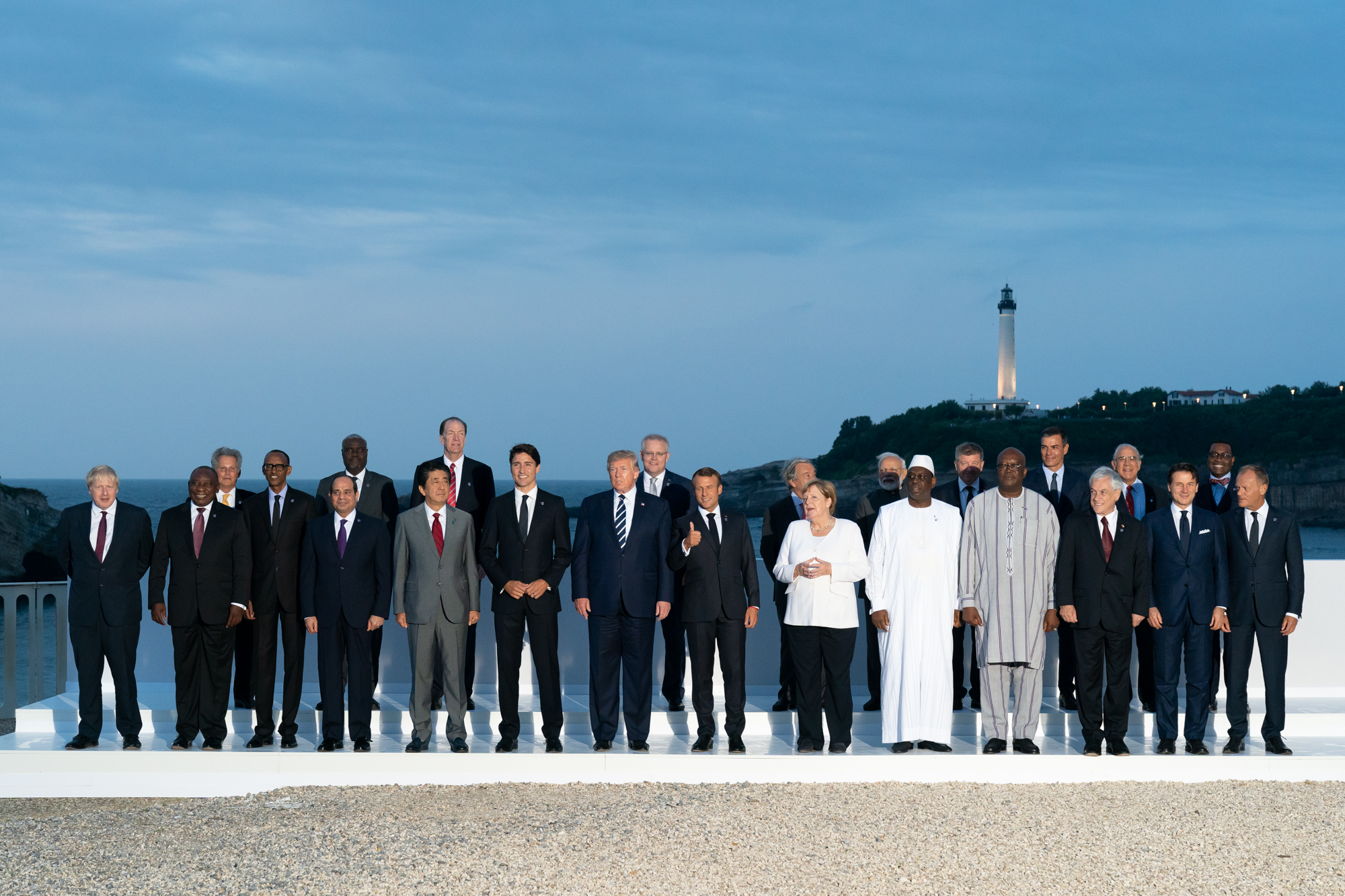
- Host country: France
- Date: 24–26 August 2019
- Cities: Biarritz
- Venues: Hôtel du Palais
- Participants: Canada; France; Germany; Italy; Japan; United Kingdom; United States; European Union Invited guests: Australia; Burkina Faso; Chile; Egypt; India; Rwanda; Senegal; South Africa; Spain
- Follows: 44th G7 summit
- Precedes: ~~46th G7 summit~~ (cancelled); 47th G7 summit
- Website: www.elysee.fr/en/g7

The 45th G7 summit was held on 24–26 August 2019, in Biarritz, France. In March 2014, the G7 declared that a meaningful discussion was currently not possible with Russia in the context of the G8. Since then, meetings have continued within the G7 process. However, according to a senior Trump administration official, US president Donald Trump and French president Emmanuel Macron had agreed that Russia should be invited to the next G7 Summit to be held in 2020.

== Concluding communique ==
Five points were agreed at the issue of the summit, about:

- the World Trade Organization, "with regard to intellectual property protection, to settle disputes more swiftly and to eliminate unfair trade practices"
- the "G7 commits to reaching an agreement in 2020 to simplify regulatory barriers and modernize international taxation within the framework of the OECD"
- the G7 shares objectives on Iran: "to ensure that Iran never acquires nuclear weapons and to foster peace and stability in the region."
- on Libya: "We support a truce in Libya that will lead to a long-term ceasefire. We believe that only a political solution can ensure Libya’s stability. We call for a well-prepared international conference to bring together all the stakeholders and regional actors relevant to this conflict. We support in this regard the work of the United Nations and the African Union to set up an inter-Libyan conference."
- in an opaque reference to the Russian invasion of Ukraine, "France and Germany will organize a Normandy format summit in the coming weeks to achieve tangible results."
- in light of the 2019–20 Hong Kong protests, "The G7 reaffirms the existence and the importance of the 1984 Sino-British agreement on Hong Kong and calls for avoiding violence."

== Final press conference ==
In the final press conference, British prime minister Boris Johnson said "Iran should never be allowed to get a nuclear weapon", and Trump spoke about Iran in a joint news conference with Macron. Whereas the European powers sought to appease Iran, Trump said in apparent reference to combative rhetoric by the Iranian government about its ability to attack US interests:

They can't do what they were saying they were going to do because if they do that, they will be met with really very violent force.

== Host ==
France, as the host of the 2019 G7 summit, held it at the Hôtel du Palais in Biarritz.

== Leaders at the summit ==
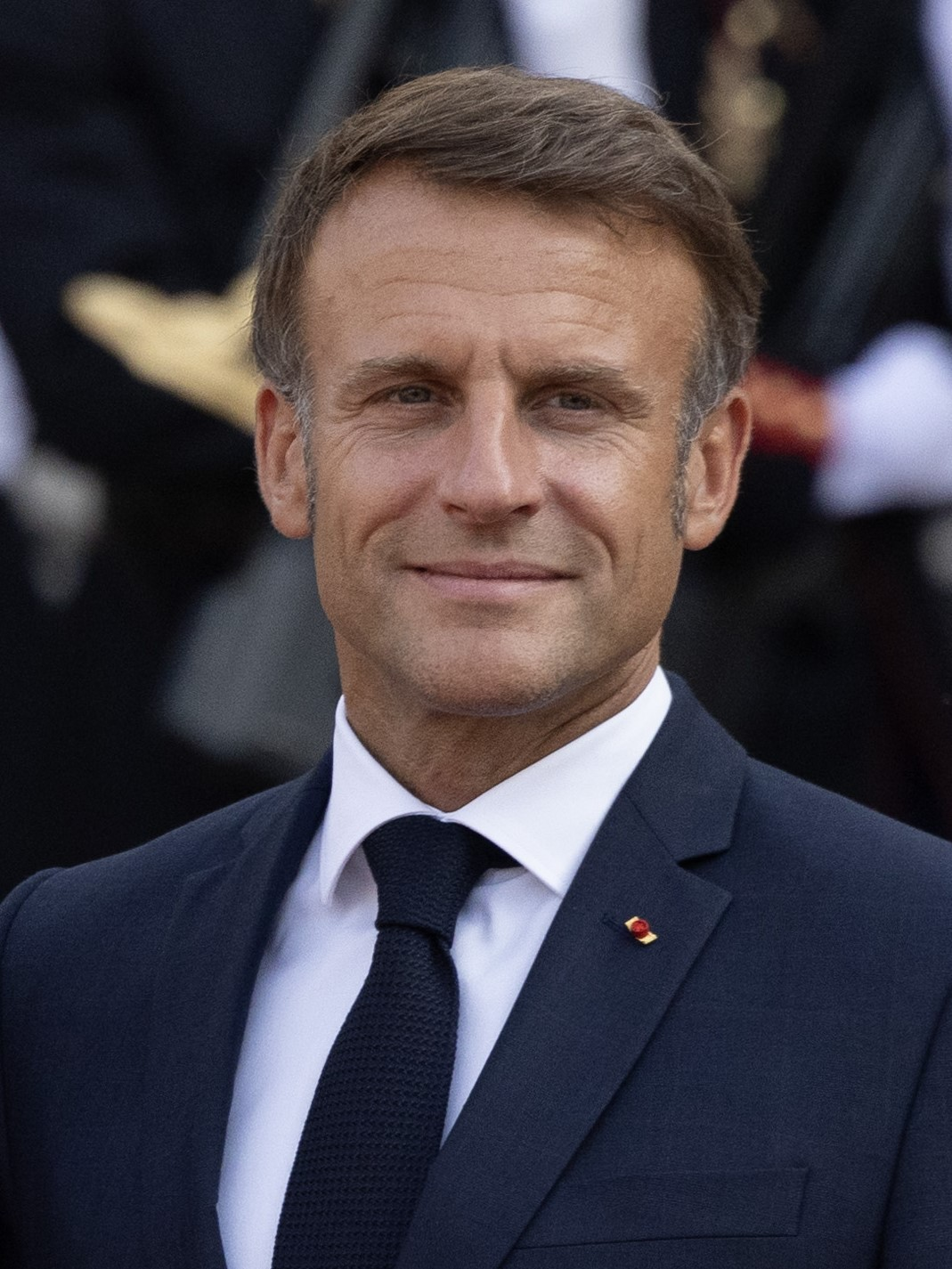
Emmanuel Macron chaired the 45th G7 summit.

Attendees included leaders of the G7 member states plus representatives of the European Union. The President of the European Commission has been a permanent participant at all meetings since 1981, but current President Jean-Claude Juncker did not attend due to medical problems. The President of the European Council has been the EU's co-representative since the 36th G8 summit hosted by Canada in 2010.

The 45th G7 summit was the first summit for British Prime Minister Boris Johnson and the last summit for European Council President Donald Tusk. It was also the final summit for Japanese Prime Minister Shinzō Abe and Italian Prime Minister Giuseppe Conte. (Note: The planned 46th G7 summit in 2020 was cancelled due to the COVID-19 pandemic.) Abe handed over power to Yoshihide Suga on 16 September 2020 and Conte handed over power to Mario Draghi on 13 February 2021

For this summit, Abe had prepared to discuss about the situation in Hong Kong, where China is imposing a new security law.

Macron invited the Prime Minister of Australia Scott Morrison, the Prime Minister of Spain Pedro Sánchez, and the Prime Minister of India Narendra Modi to attend the outreach session of the summit as special invitees.

=== Participants ===
**Core G7 members** Host state and leader are shown in bold text.
Member		Represented by	Title
(Canada)	Canada	Justin Trudeau	Prime Minister
(France)	**France**	**Emmanuel Macron**	**President**
(Germany)	Germany	Angela Merkel	Chancellor
(Italy)	Italy	Giuseppe Conte	Prime Minister
(Japan)	Japan	Shinzō Abe	Prime Minister
(United Kingdom)	United Kingdom	Boris Johnson	Prime Minister
(United States)	United States	Donald Trump	President
(European Union)	European Union	Donald Tusk	Council President
**Invitees**
Guest		Represented by	Title
(Australia)	Australia	Scott Morrison	Prime Minister
(Burkina Faso)	Burkina Faso	Roch Marc Christian Kaboré	President
(Chile)	Chile	Sebastián Piñera	President
(Egypt)	Egypt	Abdel Fattah el-Sisi	President
(India)	India	Narendra Modi	Prime Minister
(Rwanda)	Rwanda	Paul Kagame	President
(Senegal)	Senegal	Macky Sall	President
(South Africa)	South Africa	Cyril Ramaphosa	President
(Spain)	Spain	Pedro Sánchez	Acting President of the Government

== Gallery of participating leaders ==
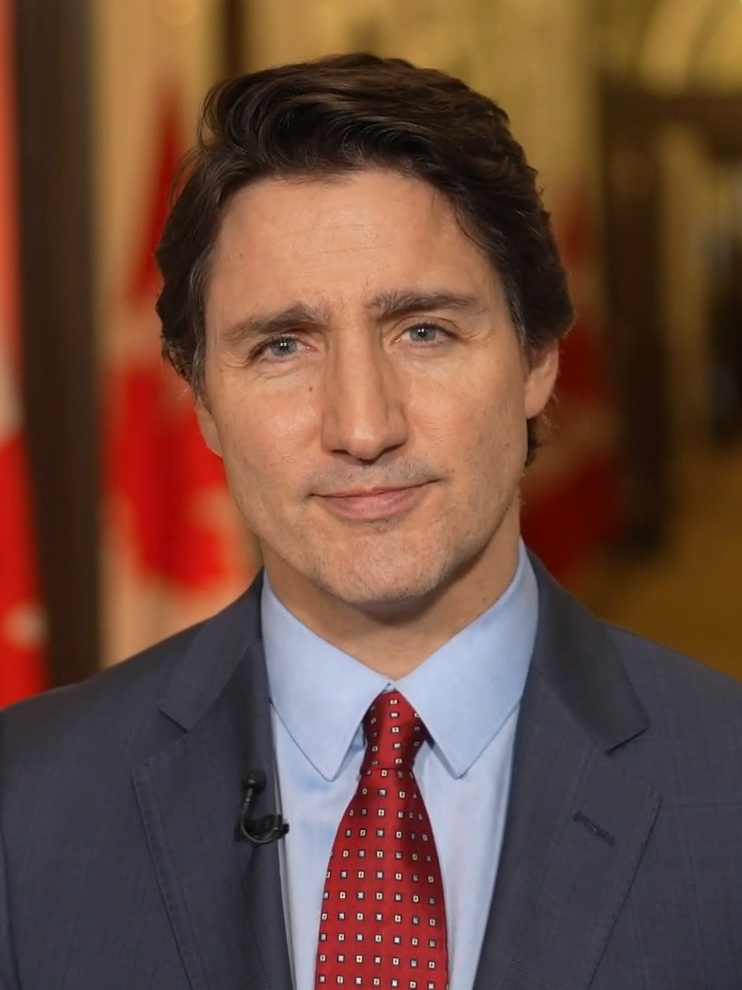
(Canada) Canada
Justin Trudeau,
Prime Minister

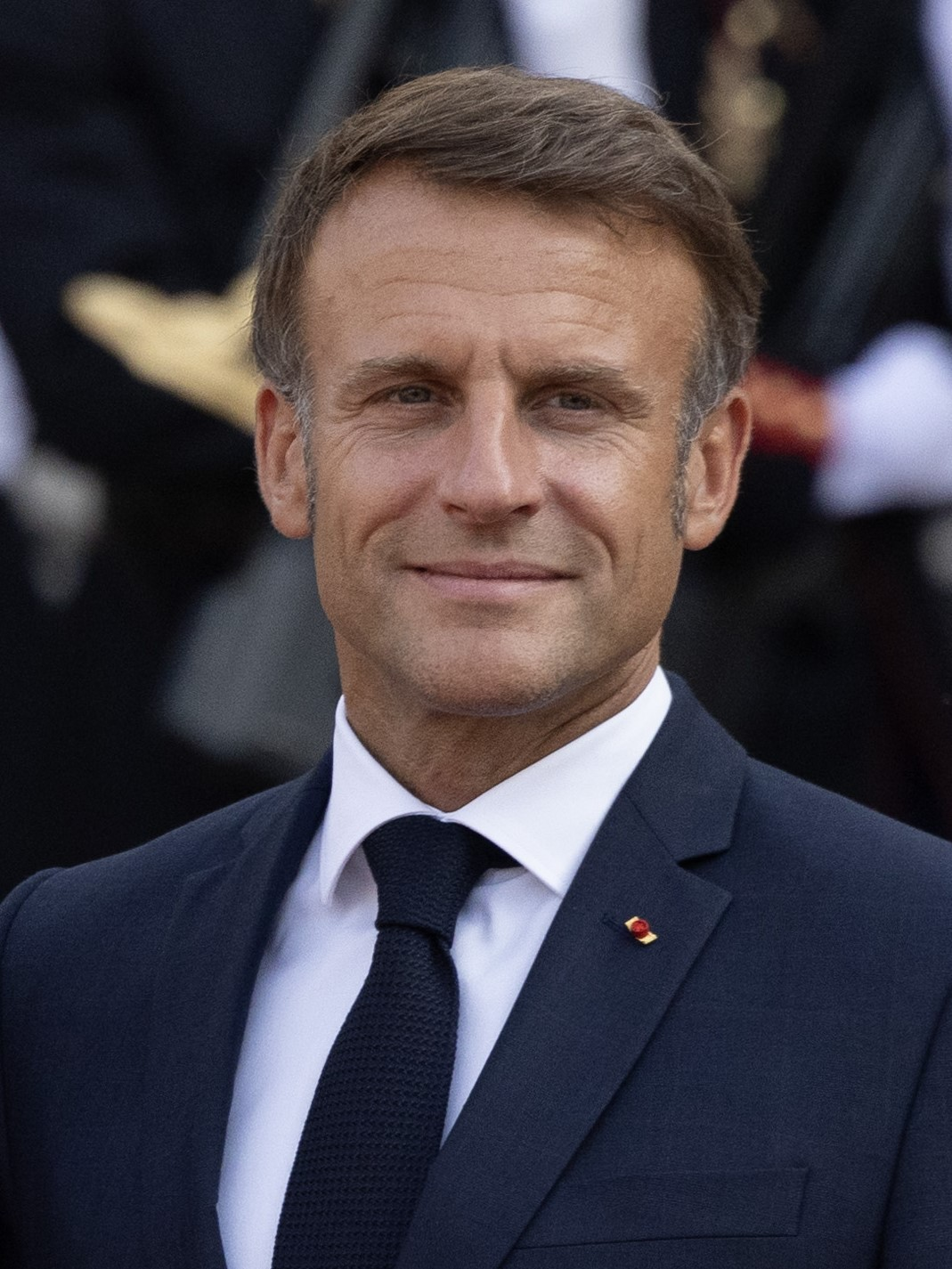
(France) France
Emmanuel Macron,
President (Host)

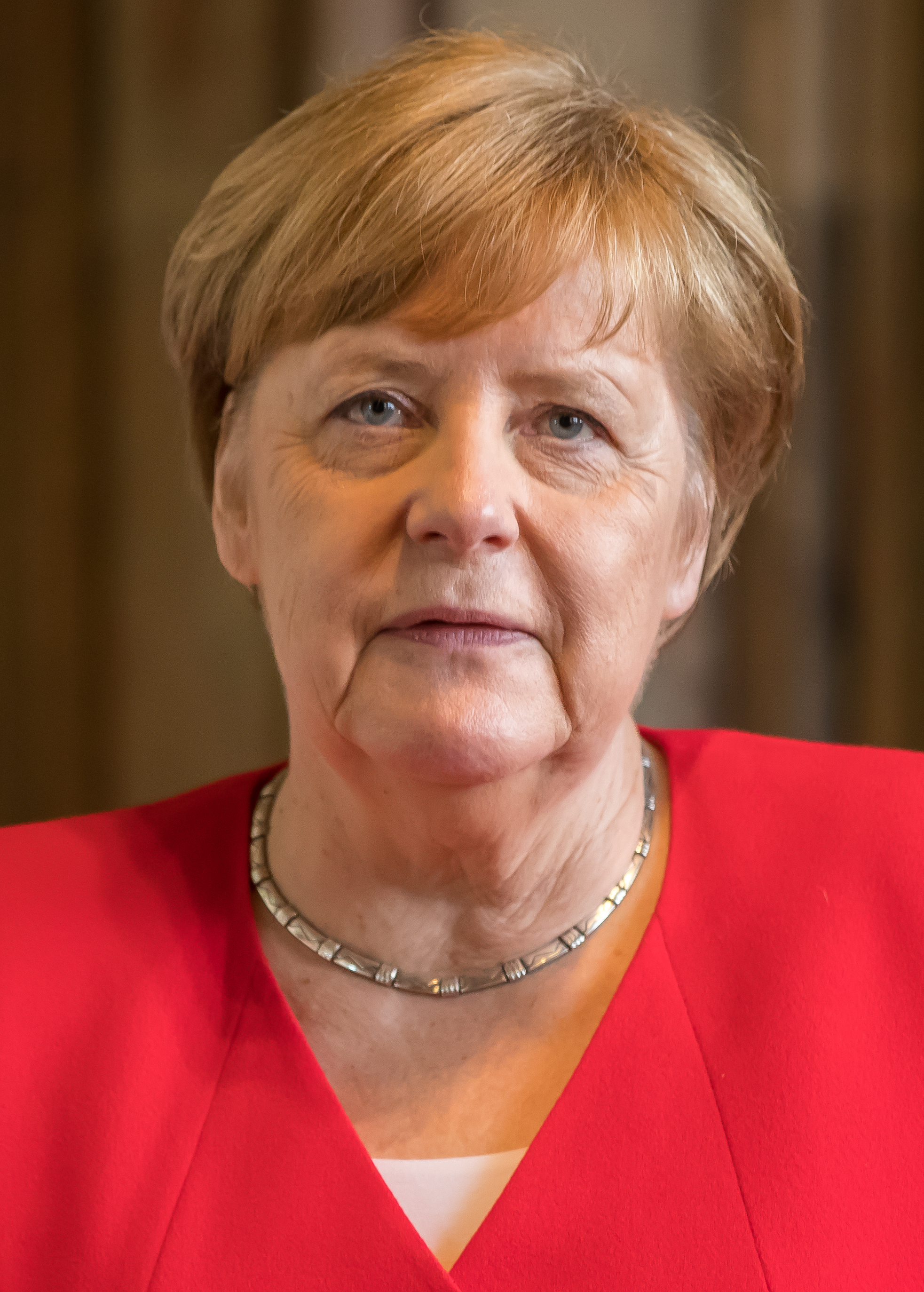
(Germany) Germany
Angela Merkel,
Chancellor

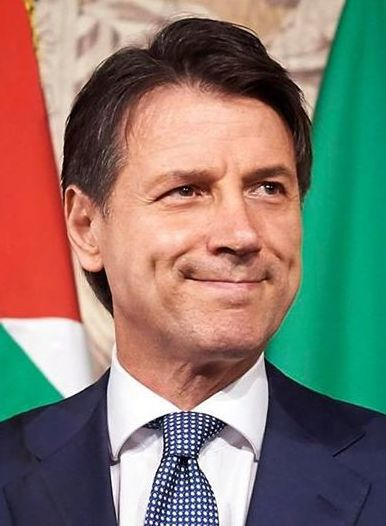
Italy
Giuseppe Conte,
Prime Minister

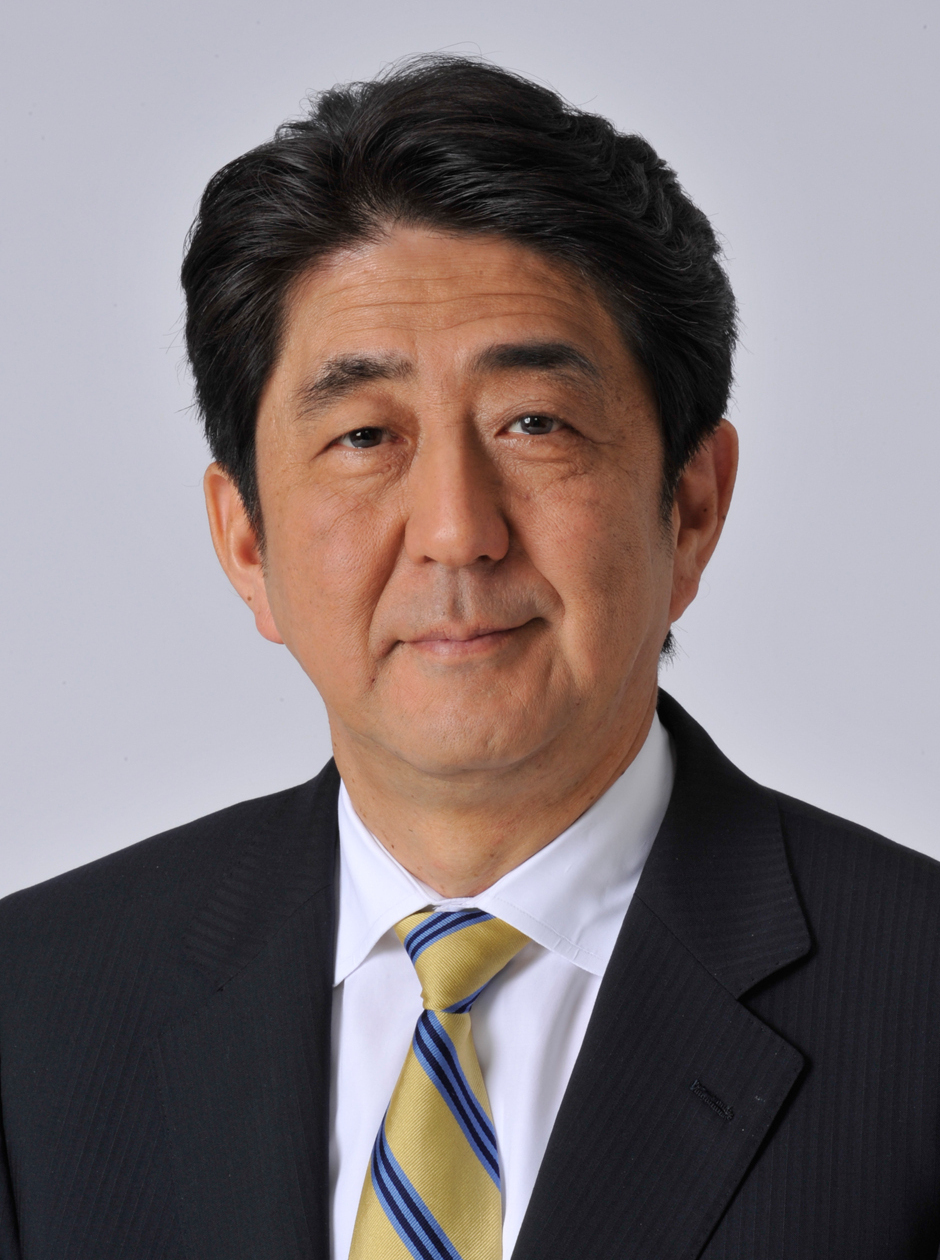
(Japan) Japan
Shinzō Abe,
Prime Minister

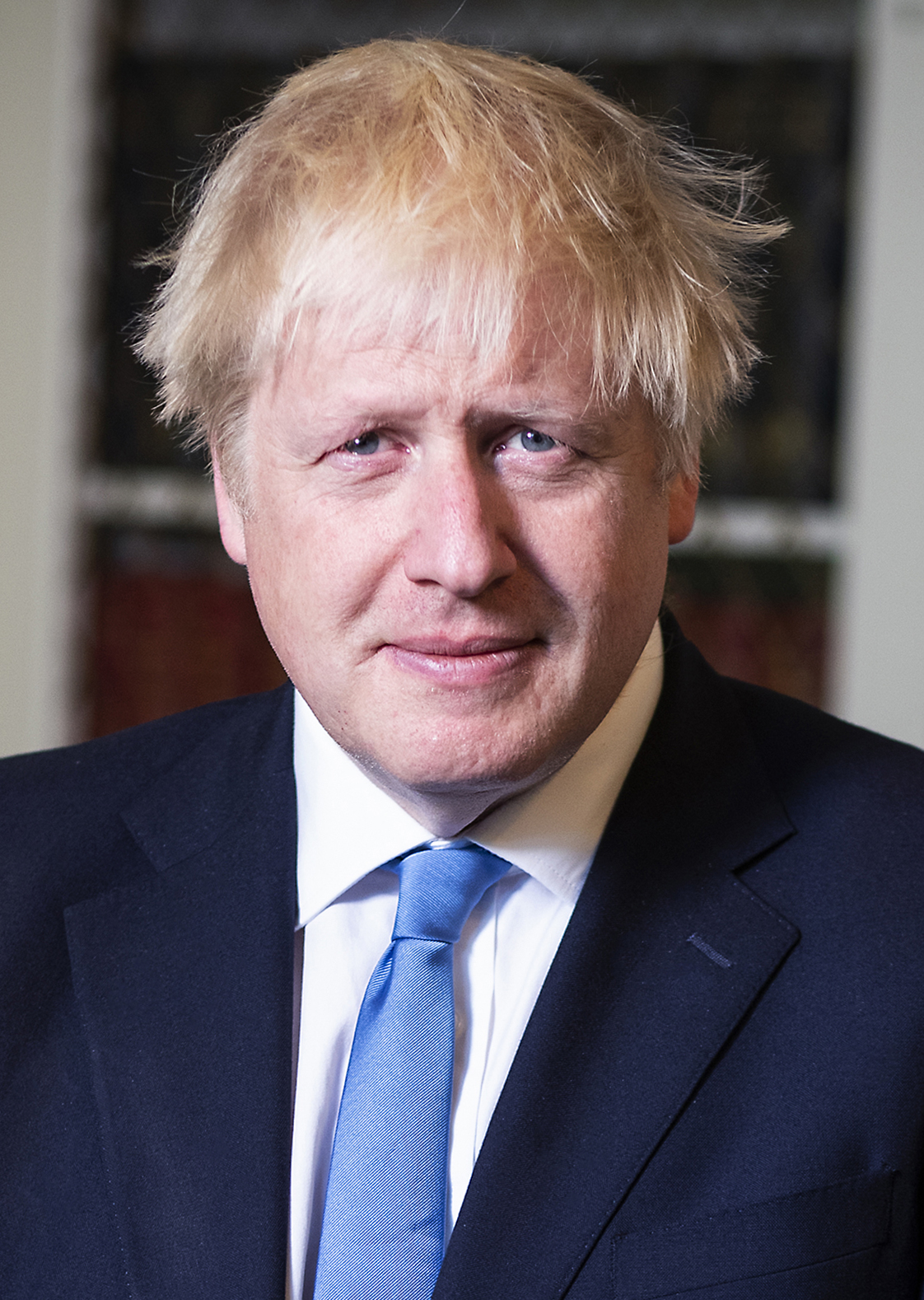
(United Kingdom) United Kingdom
Boris Johnson,
Prime Minister

(United States) United States
Donald Trump,
President
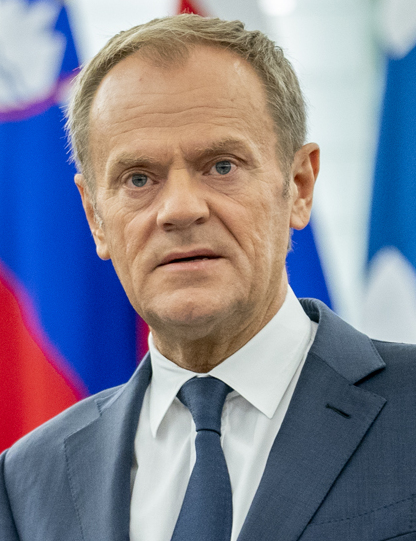
(European Union) European Union
Donald Tusk,
Council President

=== Invited guests ===
==== Presidents and Heads of government ====
The following leaders were invited to the Outreach Session of the G7 Summit.

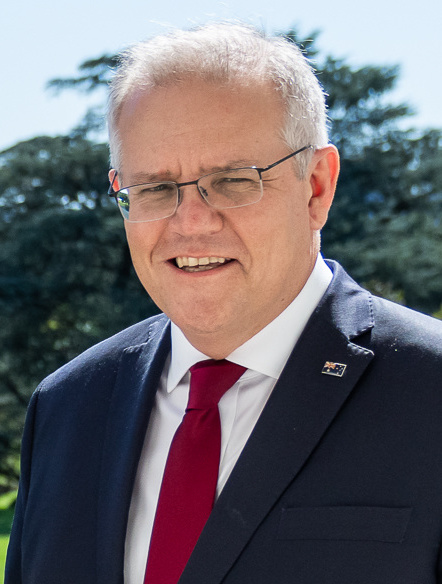
Australia
Scott Morrison, Prime Minister

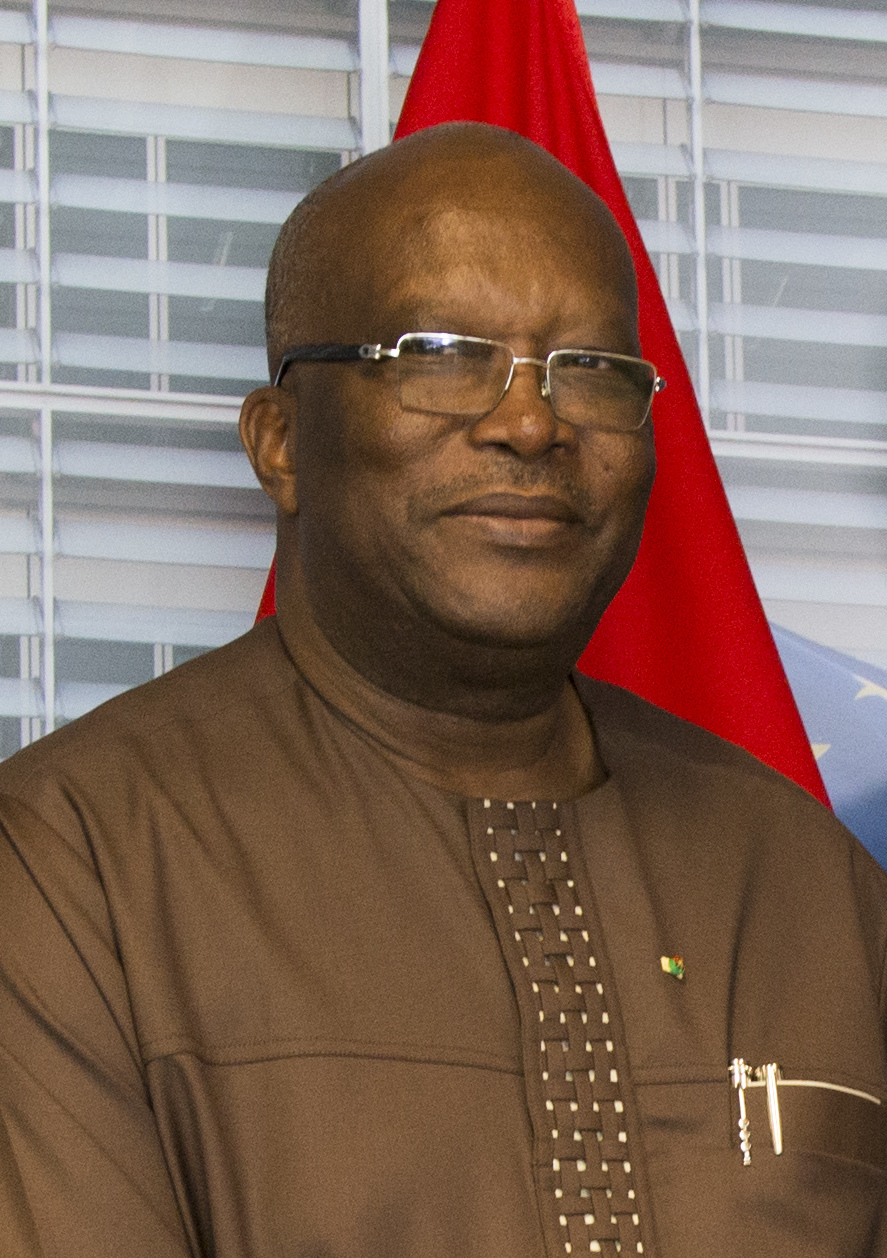
Burkina Faso
Roch Marc Christian Kaboré, President

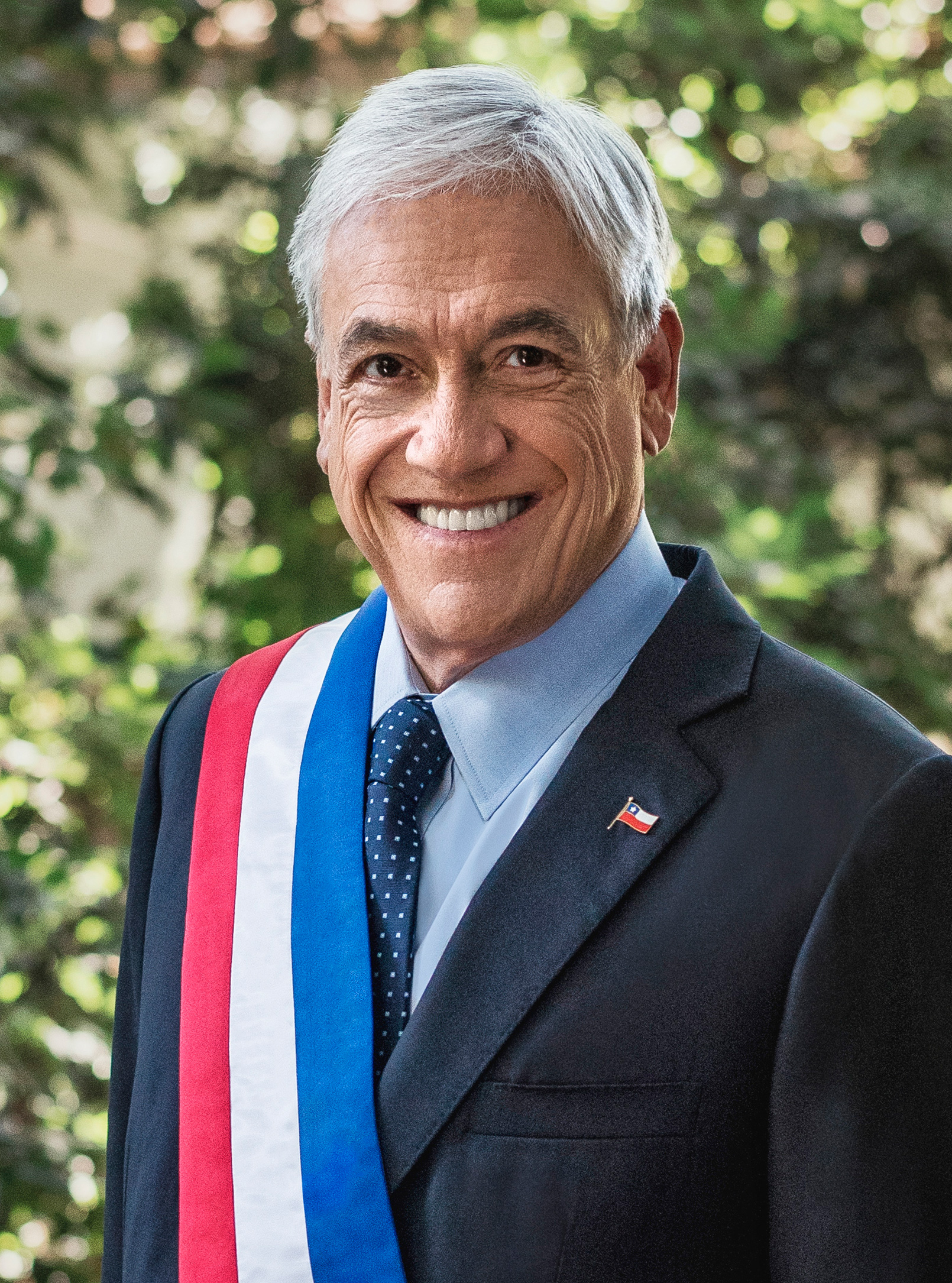
Chile
Sebastián Piñera, President

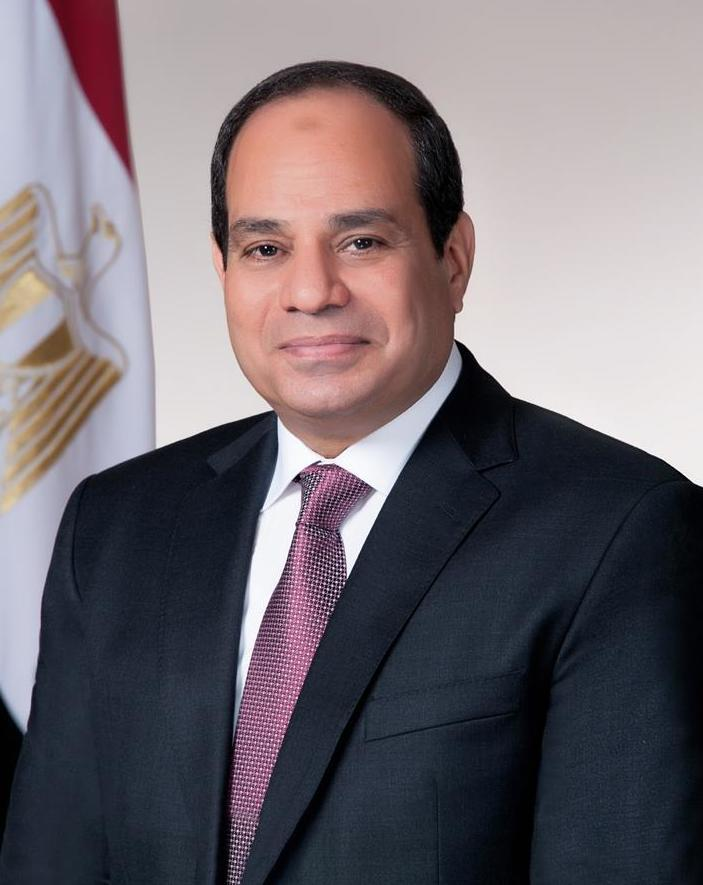
Egypt
Abdel Fattah el-Sisi, President

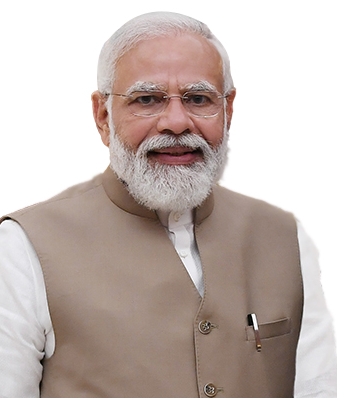
India
Narendra Modi, Prime Minister

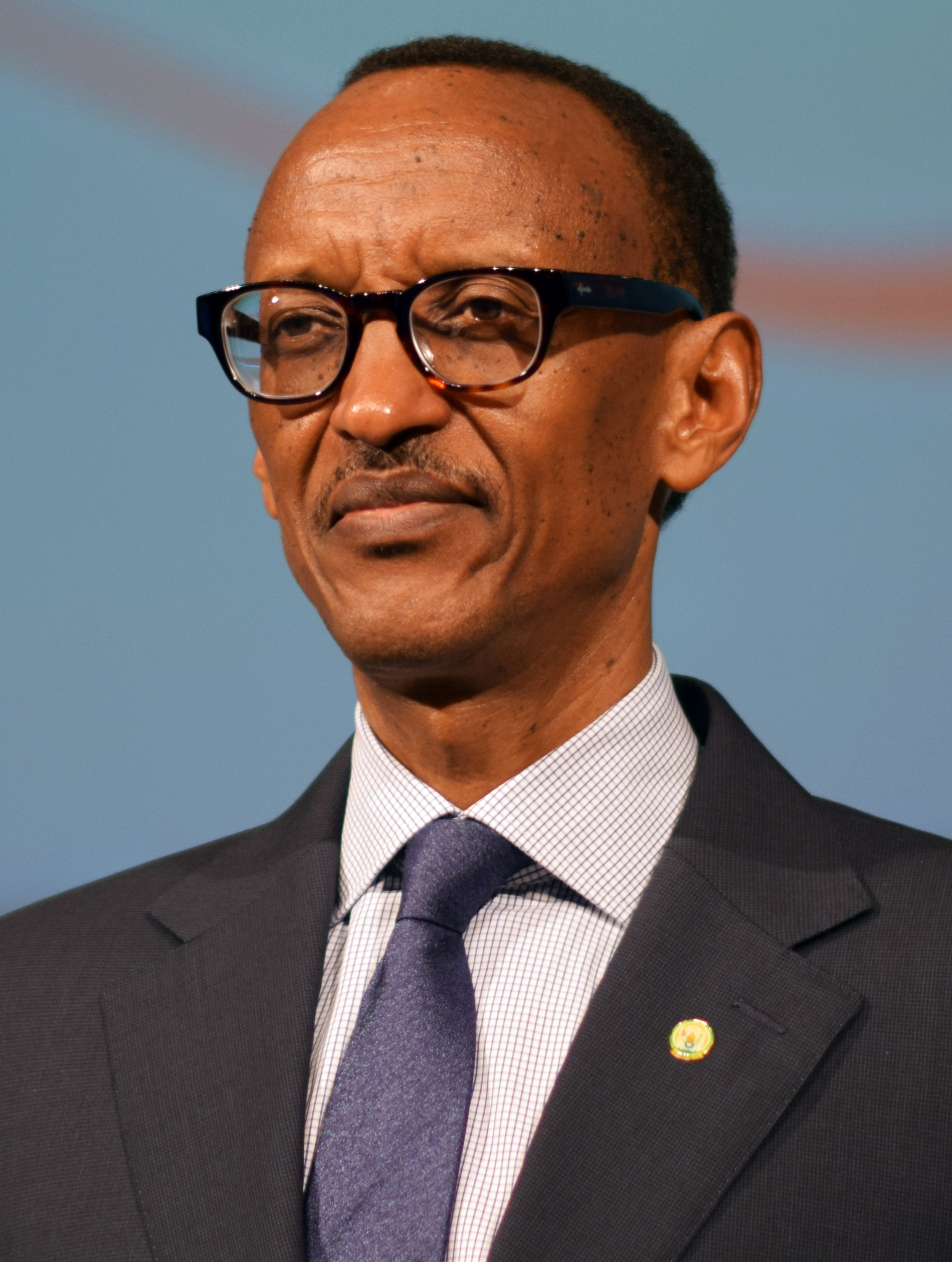
Rwanda
Paul Kagame,
President

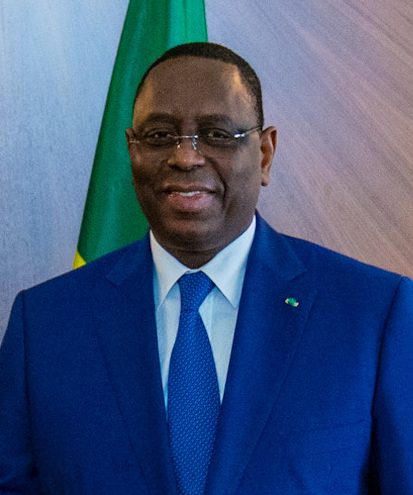
Senegal
Macky Sall,
President

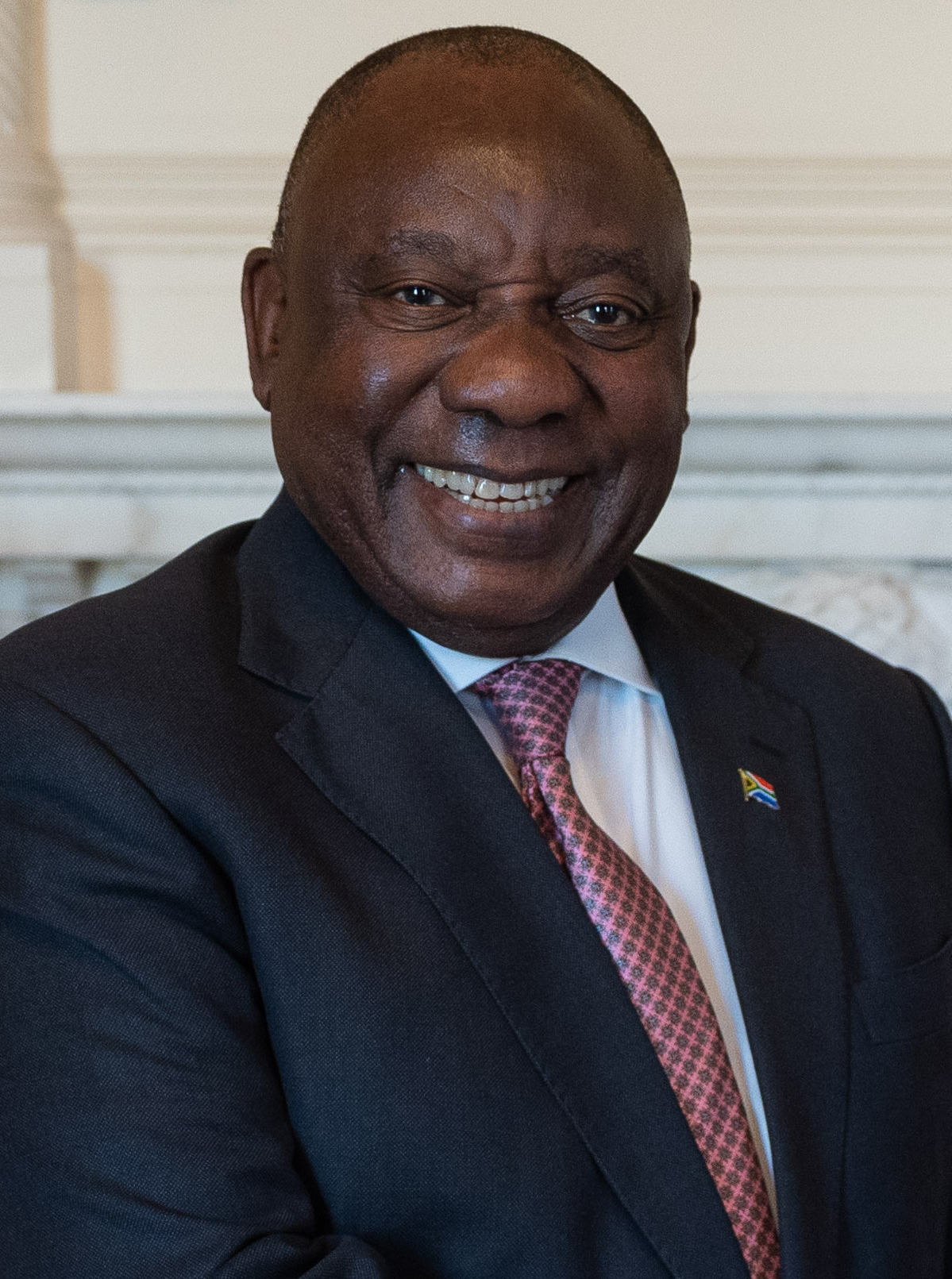
South Africa
Cyril Ramaphosa, President

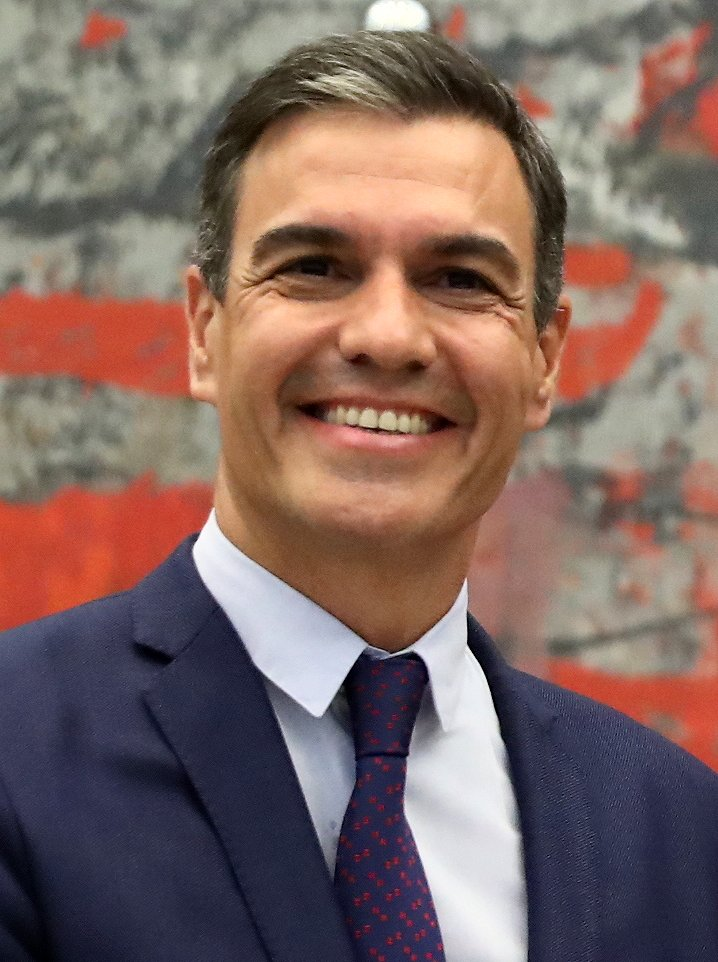
Spain
Pedro Sánchez, President of the Government

==== Heads of international organisations ====
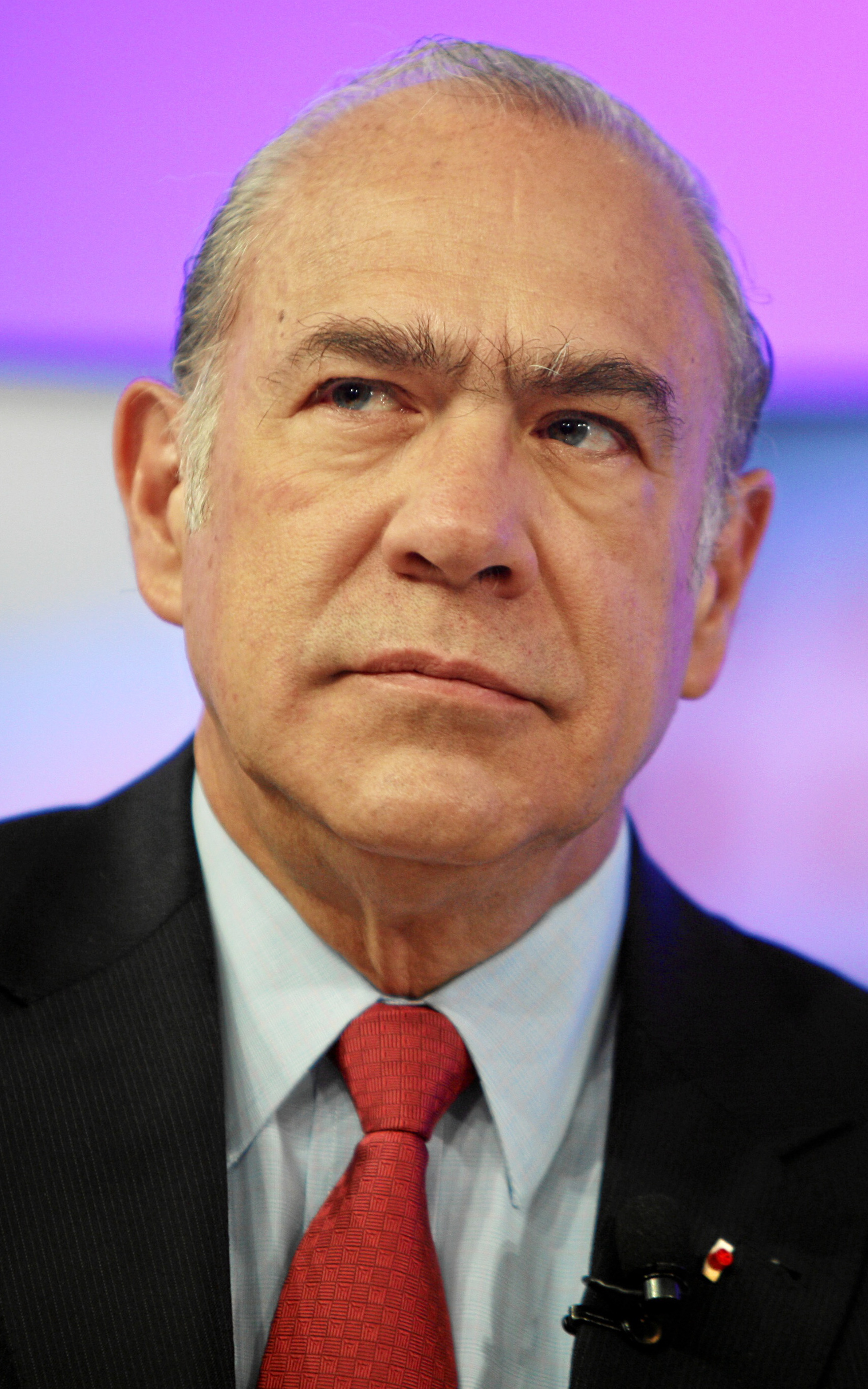
OECD
José Ángel Gurría, Secretary-General

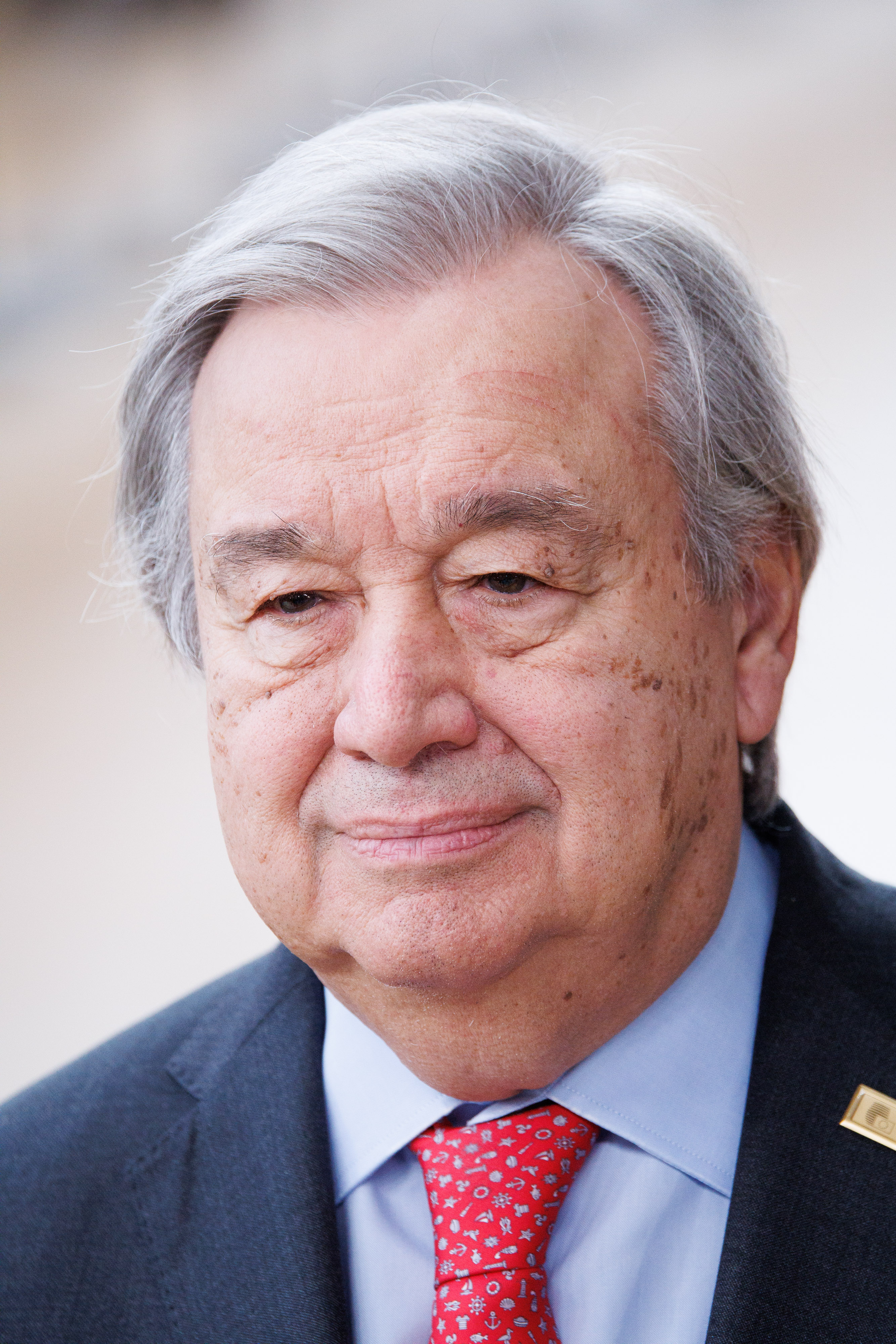
United Nations
António Guterres, Secretary-General

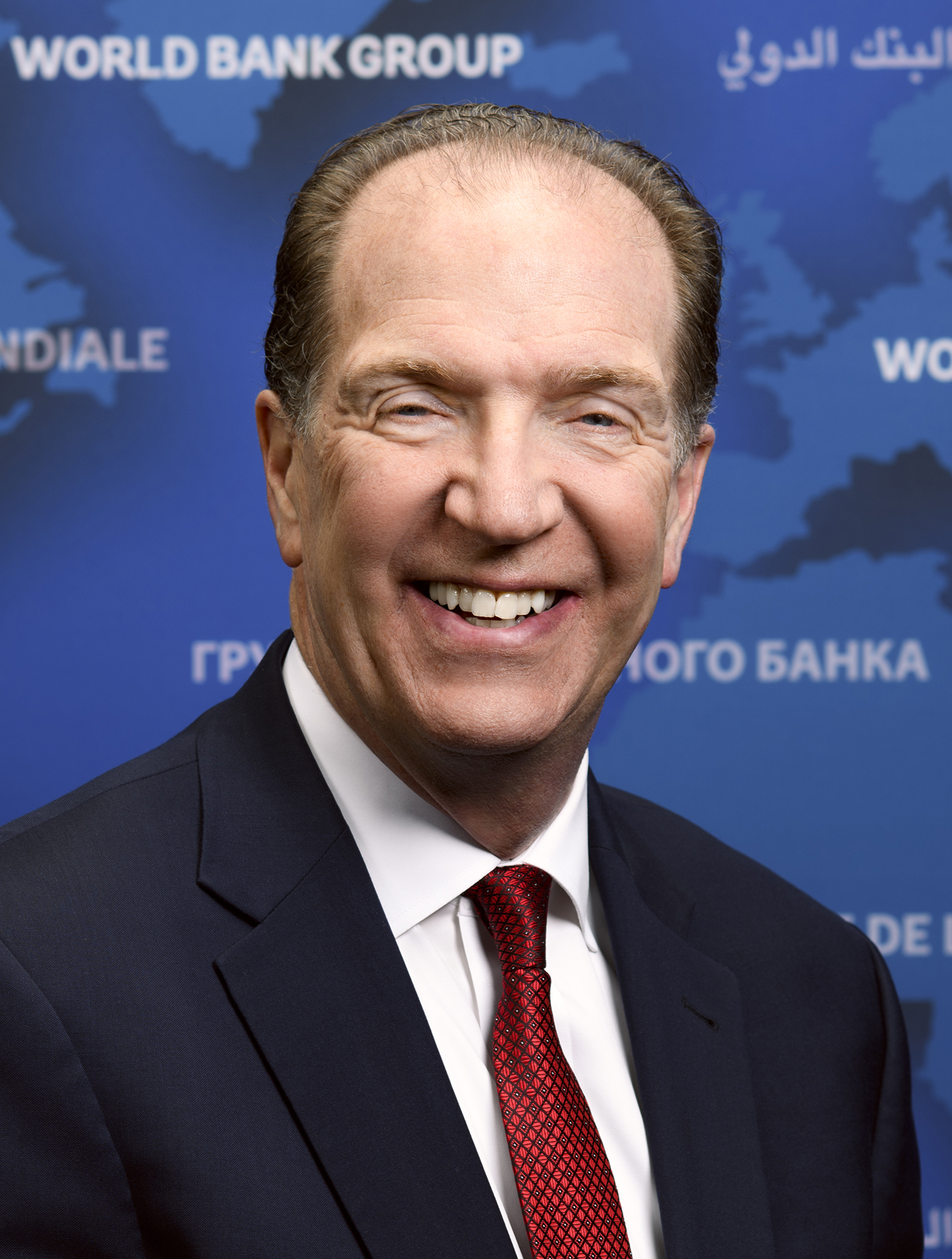
World Bank Group
David Malpass, President

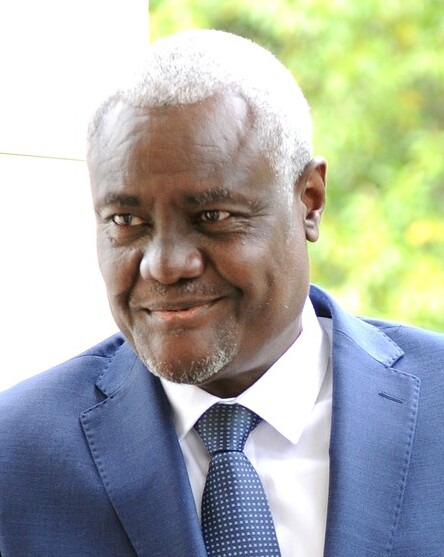
African Union Commission
Moussa Faki, Chair

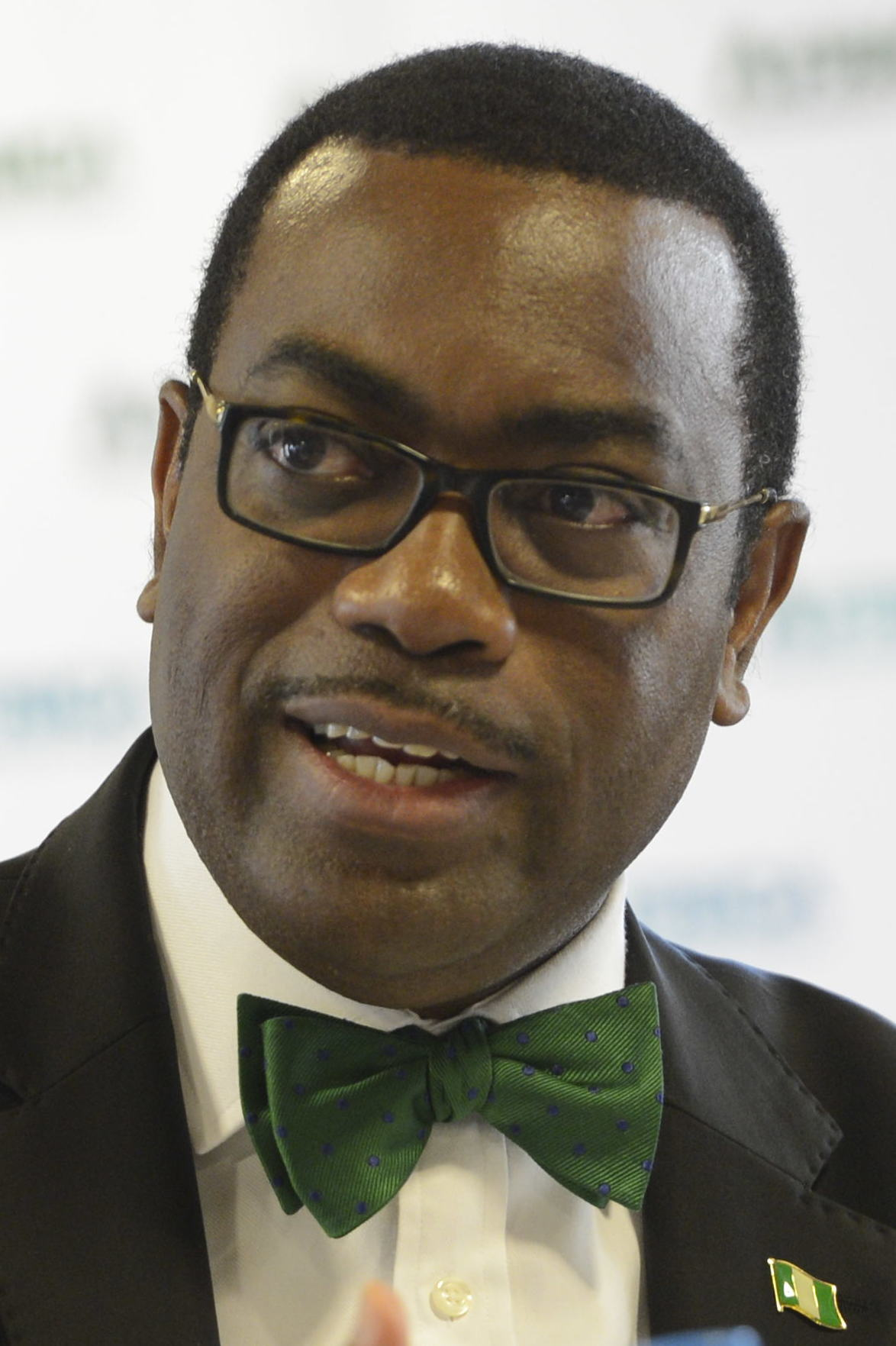
African Development Bank
Akinwumi Adesina, President

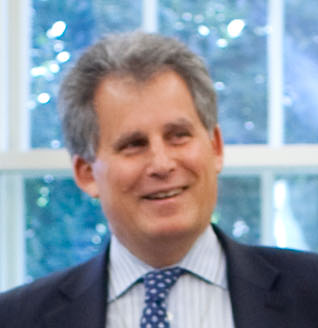
International Monetary Fund
David Lipton,
Acting managing director

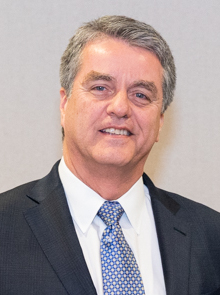
World Trade Organization
Roberto Azevêdo,
Director-General

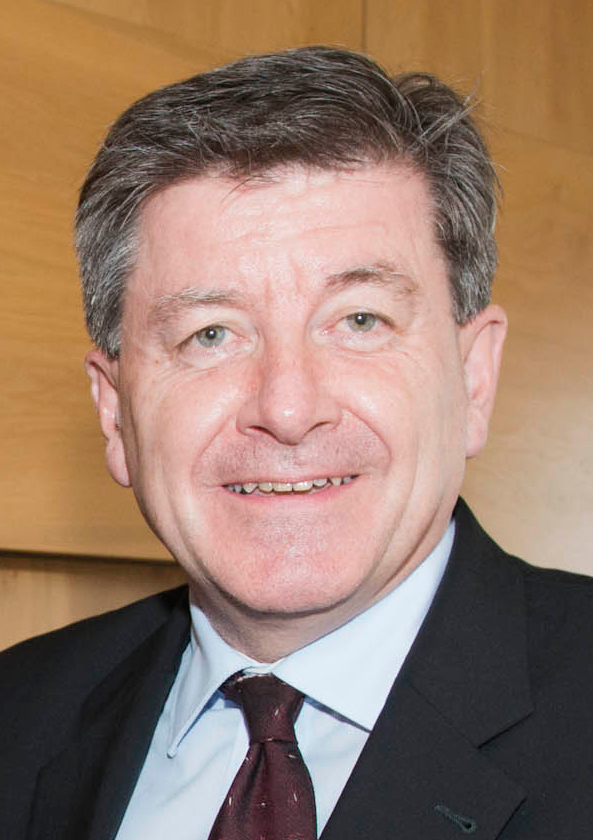
International Labour Organization
Guy Ryder, Director-General

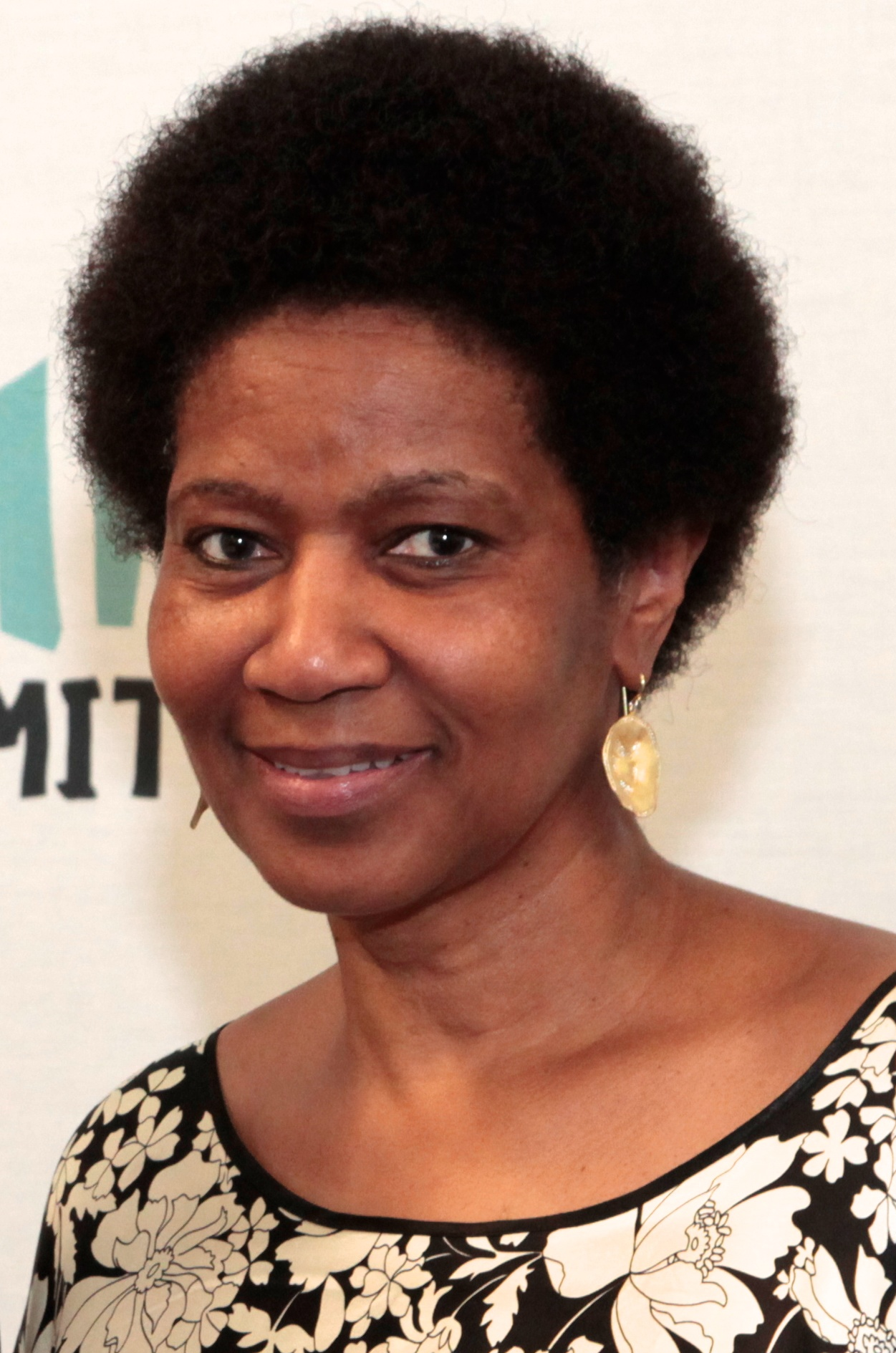
United Nations
Phumzile Mlambo-Ngcuka

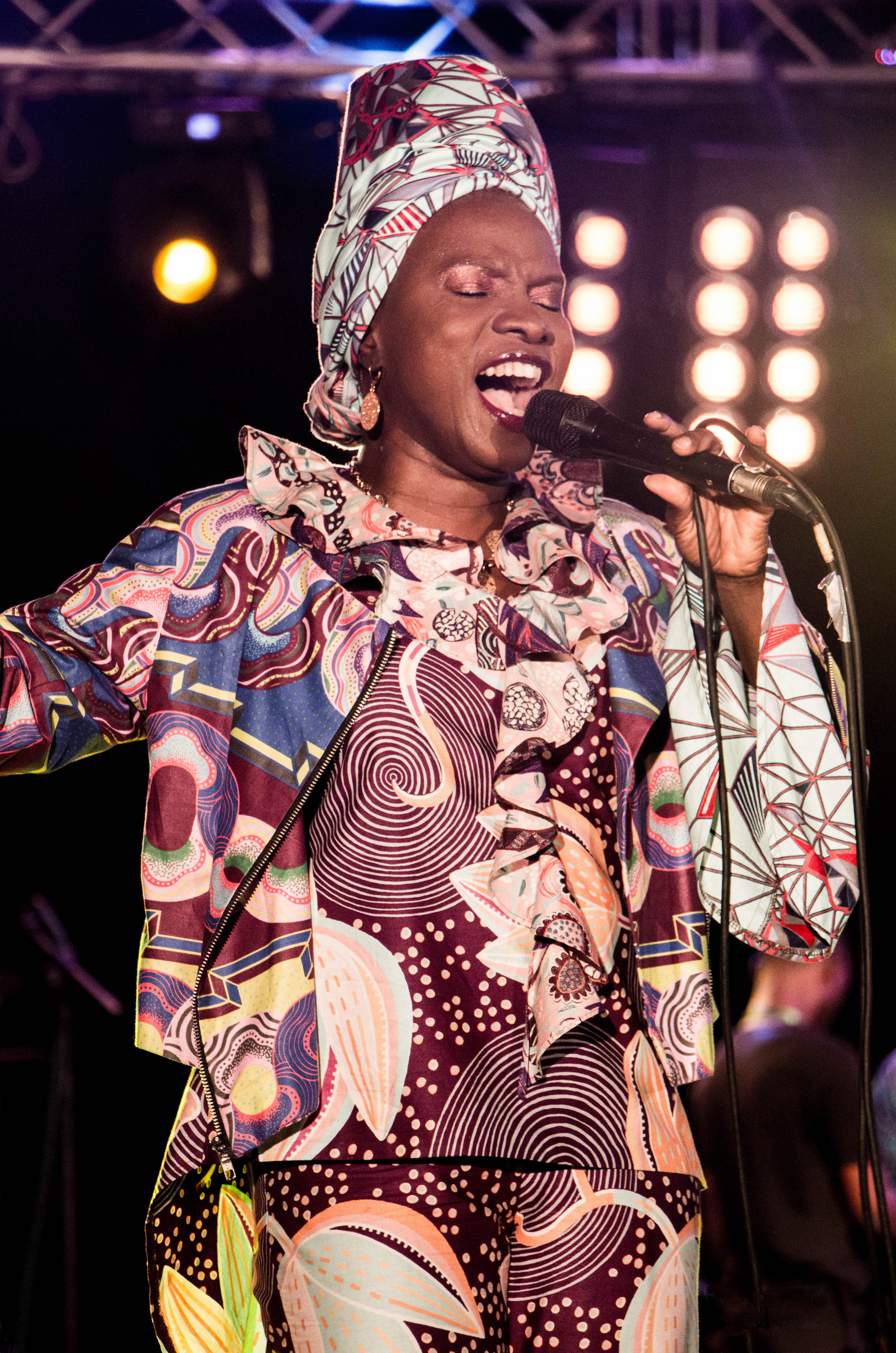
Angélique Kidjo, Beninese-American singer-songwriter

=== Participation ===
The Prime Ministers of Italy and Spain, Conte and Sanchez, took part in the summit as caretaker Prime Ministers. Juncker of the European Commission did not attend due to bad health.

In a surprise move, Macron invited to attend on the margins Javad Zarif, who flew in on an Iranian government plane. Macron, who "attempted a high-risk diplomatic gambit", thought that the Foreign Minister of Iran might be able to defuse the tense situation over the Iranian nuclear programme in spite of the recent uptick in tensions between the Islamic Republic and the United States and Britain. A highly placed French political source said that

It doesn't mean that Mr Trump is actively supporting the talks, only that he is allowing them to happen. If there are advances, he can welcome them and perhaps share the credit. If nothing comes of it, he won't have to disown it because it was a French initiative. If it does succeed in reducing tension, it will be a huge diplomatic coup for Mr Macron.

== Topics ==
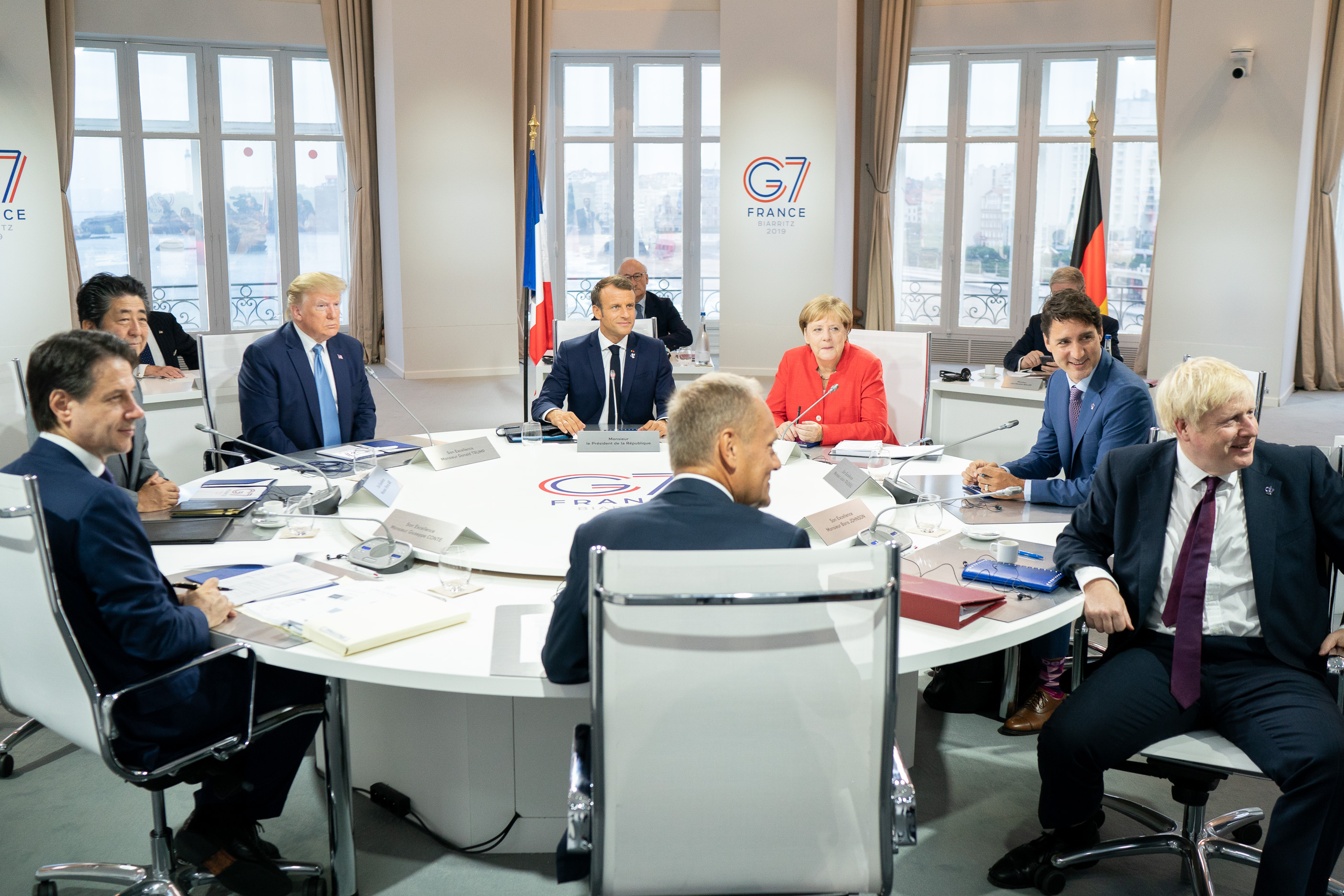
Working session on 25 August 2019

Topics discussed included global trade, global warming, and taxing technology companies. Tusk said leaders at the summit should discuss the Iran nuclear deal, which was at risk due to the U.S. government's decision to pull out.

On 23 August, Macron urged the G7 to lead the summit discussions with the 2019 Amazon wildfires, which he described as an "international crisis". He said, "Our house is burning. Literally", adding that the Amazon rainforest produces 20% of the world's oxygen. Trump offered to take the position of the Brazilian government to the meeting, and said that the US government did not agree to discuss the issue without Brazil's presence. The United Kingdom, Italy, Japan, Spain, and Chile also support Brazil. During the meeting, it was reported that there were "sharp differences" among the participants.

On a request from the Macron, François-Henri Pinault, Chairman and CEO of the luxury group Kering, presented the Fashion Pact during the summit, an initiative signed by 32 fashion firms committing to concrete measures to reduce their environmental impact. By 2020, 60 firms had joined the Fashion Pact.

== Protests and counter-summit ==
More than 13,000 police were required for security. The French government wished to avoid anti-globalization movements. The protesters of the summit had several motivations, such as anti extractivism and anti-globalization. Protesters included human rights groups and climate change activists.

A number of small French and Basque organizations joined to organize a "Contre G7" summit, over the same days as the G7, in the south of the French Basque country.
