= George L. Russell III =

American judge (born 1965)

George Russell
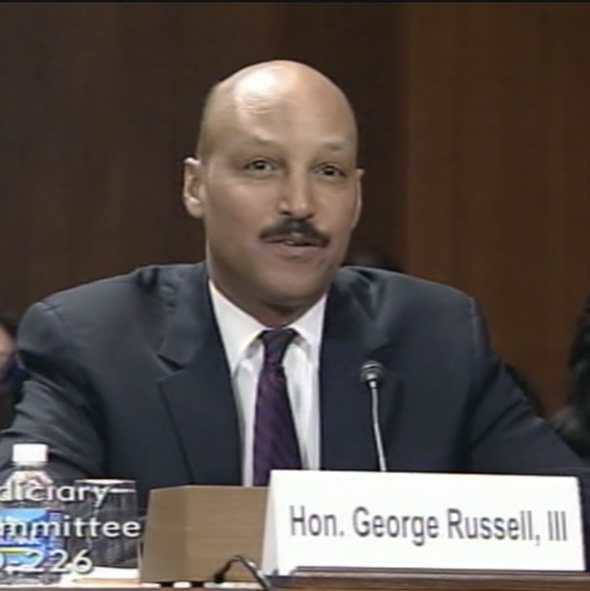

Chief District Judge of the United States District Court for the District of Maryland
- Incumbent
- Assumed office May 1, 2024
- Preceded by: James K. Bredar

Judge of the United States District Court for the District of Maryland
- Incumbent
- Assumed office May 22, 2012
- Appointed by: Barack Obama
- Preceded by: Peter J. Messitte

Personal details
- Born: George Levi Russell III; 1965 (age 60–61) Baltimore, Maryland, U.S.
- Education: Morehouse College (BA); University of Maryland, Baltimore (JD)

George Levi Russell III (born 1965) is the Chief District Judge of the United States District Court for the District of Maryland.

== Biography ==
George Levi Russell III was born in 1965 in Baltimore, Maryland. His father, George Levi Russell Jr. (1929–2025), was the first African American to sit on the circuit court in Maryland. Russell received his Bachelor of Arts degree from Morehouse College in 1988. He received his Juris Doctor from the University of Maryland School of Law in 1991. He served as a law clerk for Judge Robert M. Bell of the Maryland Court of Appeals from 1991 to 1992. He worked at Hazel & Thomas PC from 1992 to 1994. He served as an Assistant United States Attorney from 1994 to 1999 handling civil matters. He worked at the law firm of Peter G. Angelos, PC from 2000 to 2002. He again served as an Assistant United States Attorney from 2002 to 2007 handling criminal cases. He was appointed as an associate judge of the Circuit Court of Maryland in Baltimore where he served from 2007 until 2012.

=== Federal judicial service ===
On November 10, 2011, President Barack Obama nominated Russell to be a district judge on the United States District Court for the District of Maryland. He would replace Judge Peter J. Messitte, who assumed senior status in 2008. He received his Senate Judiciary Committee hearing on January 26, 2012 and his nomination was reported to the floor on February 16, 2012 by voice vote, with Senator Mike Lee recording the only no vote. On May 14, 2012, the Senate confirmed his nomination by voice vote. He received his commission on May 22, 2012. Russell became the chief judge on May 1, 2024, after James K. Bredar assumed senior status.

== See also ==
- List of African-American federal judges
- List of African-American jurists

Legal offices
Preceded by Peter J. Messitte	Judge of the United States District Court for the District of Maryland; 2012–present	Incumbent
Preceded by James K. Bredar	Chief Judge of the United States District Court for the District of Maryland; 2024–present	Incumbent
