= Blumenthal v. Trump =

Lawsuit between members of Congress and Donald Trump concerning emoluments

- Court: United States Court of Appeals for the District of Columbia Circuit
- Full case name: Richard Blumenthal, et al., Appellees v. Donald J. Trump, in His Official Capacity as President of the United States of America, Appellant
- Argued: December 9, 2019
- Decided: February 7, 2020
- Counsel for plaintiff: Elizabeth Bonnie Wydra, Brian Rene Frazelle, Brianne Jenna Gorod
- Citation: 949 F.3d 14 (D.C. Cir. 2020)

Case history
- Prior history: No. 1:17-cv-01154, 335 F. Supp. 3d 45 (D.D.C. 2018); 373 F. Supp. 3d 191 (D.D.C. 2019)

Holding
- The Court of Appeals held that members of Congress lacked standing to bring an emoluments clause action against the President under U.S. Const. art. I, § 9, cl. 8 because individual members of the Congress lack standing to assert the institutional interests of the legislature. The district court erred in holding that the members suffered an injury based on the President depriving them of the opportunity to give or withhold their consent to foreign emoluments.

Court membership
- Judges sitting: Karen L. Henderson, David S. Tatel, Thomas B. Griffith

Case opinions
- Per curiam

Blumenthal v. Trump, 949 F.3d 14 (D.C. Cir. 2020), was a U.S. constitutional law and federal civil procedure lawsuit heard by Circuit Judges Henderson, Tatel, and Griffith, of the United States Court of Appeals for the District of Columbia Circuit. The case was on appeal from the United States District Court for the District of Columbia, where District Judge Emmet G. Sullivan granted in part and denied in part the President's motion to dismiss for lack of standing, denied the President's motion to dismiss for failure to state claim, and certified interlocutory appeal.

On February 7, 2020, in a per curiam decision, the court of appeals held that individual members of Congress lacked standing to bring action against the President where they sought declaratory and injunctive relief for alleged violations of the Foreign Emoluments Clause. The court, finding in favor of President Trump, reversed and remanded the lower court's holding that the members had standing to sue, with instructions to the district court to dismiss the complaint. The dismissal subsequently rendered the other issue on appeal, the holding that the members had a cause of action and stated a claim, vacated as moot.

== Background and initiation of suit ==
Alexander Hamilton, one of the framers of the Constitution, was concerned about foreign corruption of the new United States. Towards that end, the Foreign Emoluments Clause can be seen as a measure to prevent corruption, but one that has yet to be interpreted by the courts.

The plaintiffs, 29 Senators and 186 Representatives, led by the Ranking Member of the Constitution Subcommittee of the Senate Judiciary Committee, Richard Blumenthal and the similarly situated Ranking Member of the House Judiciary Committee, John Conyers Jr., alleged that the defendant, Donald Trump, was in violation of the Foreign Emoluments Clause, a constitutional provision that bars the president or any other federal official from taking gifts or payments from foreign governments without the approval of Congress. They alleged that this behavior impeded their constitutional right to be advised of such foreign payments and their duty to weigh in on potentially unauthorized emoluments.

With lawyers from the Constitutional Accountability Center, the plaintiffs filed their complaint on June 14, 2017, shortly after similar lawsuits from watchdog groups, economic competitors, and state and local governments made the news. The court rejected several of Trump's arguments, and Trump's request for a writ of mandamus in the case was rejected by a higher court, but the case was stayed until December 2019 while a permitted immediate appeal of the case-to-date was decided.

== Timeline ==
The initial case was filed on June 14, 2017. The defendant was served immediately, but because President Trump was being sued in his official capacity, no official action was required before August 14, 2017. On September 15, 2017, the government filed a motion to dismiss the case. Various supplemental briefs were filed between September and April 2018. Oral arguments were heard in June 2018, mostly debating whether lawmakers have standing to sue the president. U.S. District Judge Emmet Sullivan ruled on September 28, 2018, that the plaintiff members of Congress have standing to sue in the case, but left for another day any ruling on other arguments raised by the Department of Justice's motion to dismiss. On April 30, 2019, Judge Sullivan denied Trump's motion to dismiss and further ruled that the plaintiff members of Congress had standing to sue, that there was grounds for injunctive relief against the President, and that the relief sought was constitutional. On August 21, 2019, Judge Sullivan, responding to the July 19, 2019 opinion of the D.C. Circuit court denying Trump petition for a writ of mandamus, stayed the case pending a newly allowed interlocutory appeal of previous rulings to the D.C. Circuit. That appeal was argued before a three judge panel on December 9, 2019, and the panel issued its decision, per curiam, ruling that the members of Congress lacked standing to sue, remanding the case to the district court with orders to dismiss.

== See also ==
- List of lawsuits involving Donald Trump
- Foreign Emoluments Clause
- CREW v. Trump
- D.C. and Maryland v. Trump
