= CREW v. Trump =

Lawsuit against Donald Trump concerning emoluments

Citizens for Responsibility and Ethics in Washington v. Trump
- Court: United States Court of Appeals for the Second Circuit
- Full case name: Citizens for Responsibility and Ethics in Washington, Restaurant Opportunities Centers United, Inc., Jill Phaneuf, and Eric Goode, Plaintiffs-Appellants, v. Donald J. Trump, in his official capacity as President of the United States of America, Defendant-Appellee.
- Argued: October 30, 2018
- Decided: September 13, 2019

Case history
- Prior history: 276 F. Supp. 3d 174 (S.D.N.Y. 2018)

Holding
- Plaintiffs have standing to bring an Emoluments Clause suit against President Donald Trump.

Court membership
- Judges sitting: Pierre N. Leval, Christopher F. Droney, John M. Walker, Jr.

Case opinions
- Majority: Leval, joined by Droney
- Dissent: Walker

Citizens for Responsibility and Ethics in Washington v. Trump was a case brought before the United States District Court for the Southern District of New York. The plaintiffs, watchdog group Citizens for Responsibility and Ethics in Washington (CREW), hotel and restaurant owner Eric Goode, an association of restaurants known as ROC United, and an Embassy Row hotel event booker named Jill Phaneuf alleged that the defendant, President Donald Trump, was in violation of the Foreign Emoluments Clause, a constitutional provision that bars the president or any other federal official from taking gifts or payments from foreign governments. CREW filed its complaint on January 23, 2017, shortly after Trump was inaugurated as president. An amended complaint, adding the hotel and restaurant industry plaintiffs, was filed on April 18, 2017. A second amended complaint was filed on May 10, 2017. CREW was represented by several prominent lawyers and legal scholars in the case.

U.S. District Judge George B. Daniels dismissed the case on December 21, 2017, holding that plaintiffs lacked standing. On appeal, the U.S. Court of Appeals for the Second Circuit reversed the dismissal, reinstated the suit, and remanded the case to the district court for further proceedings. In January 2021, the U.S. Supreme Court instructed the lower courts to dismiss the case (and a similar case brought by Maryland and the District of Columbia) as moot, because Trump was no longer president.

== Background ==
Citizens for Responsibility and Ethics in Washington stated that because Trump-owned buildings take in rent, room rentals and other payments from foreign governments, the president has breached the Foreign Emoluments Clause. The Constitution says that "no Person holding any Office of Profit or Trust under the United States, shall, without the Consent of the Congress, accept of any present, Emolument, Office, or Title, of any kind whatever, from any King, Prince, or foreign State." The case also includes a claim under the Domestic Emoluments Clause.

An Emoluments Clause lawsuit directed at a sitting president has never been tested in court, and there is little judicial precedent in this area of constitutional law. The Clause is, however, the subject of a considerable body of precedent from the Justice Department's Office of Legal Counsel and the Office of the Comptroller General. The plaintiffs are asking for an injunction and declaratory judgment directed at President Trump requiring that he cease violations of the Emoluments Clauses. On January 23, 2017, after the action was filed in U.S. District Court, Trump rejected the arguments underlying the lawsuit as "Without merit," and "Totally without merit" during his morning press conference at the White House.

CREW is represented in the suit by "a group comprised of former White House ethics lawyers, constitutional scholars, and Supreme Court litigators," including constitutional law professor Laurence H. Tribe of Harvard Law School; Supreme Court litigator Deepak Gupta of Gupta Wessler PLLC; Erwin Chemerinsky, the dean of the University of California, Berkeley School of Law; Richard Painter, law professor at the University of Minnesota and chief ethics lawyer in the George W. Bush administration; and Zephyr Teachout of Fordham Law School. The United States Department of Justice represents Trump.

== Quotes from second amended complaint ==
Defendant has violated the Constitution since the opening moments of his presidency and is poised to do so continually for the duration of his administration. Specifically, Defendant has committed and will commit violations of both the Foreign Emoluments Clause and the Domestic Emoluments Clause, involving at least: (a) leases held by foreign-government-owned entities in New York's Trump Tower; (b) room reservations, restaurant purchases, the use of facilities, and the purchase of other services and goods by foreign governments and diplomats, state governments, and federal agencies, at Defendant's Washington, D.C. hotel and restaurant; (c) hotel stays, property leases, restaurant purchases, and other business transactions tied to foreign governments, state governments, and federal agencies at other domestic and international establishments owned, operated, or licensed by Defendant; (d) property interests or other business dealings tied to foreign governments in numerous other countries; (e) payments from foreign-government-owned broadcasters related to rebroadcasts and foreign versions of the television program "The Apprentice" and its spinoffs; and (f) continuation of the General Services Administration lease for Defendant's Washington, D.C. hotel despite Defendant's breach, and potential provision of federal tax credits in connection with the same property.

== District court proceedings ==
President Trump filed a motion to dismiss on June 9, 2017. on the grounds that the plaintiffs had no right to sue and that the described conduct was not illegal. A response to the motion to dismiss was filed on August 4, 2017, with a DOJ reply due by September 22, 2017. A full answer from DOJ lawyers to the facts alleged in the complaint was due on August 11, 2017. Oral arguments were expected October 18, 2017.

On December 21, 2017, the motion to dismiss was granted; Judge George B. Daniels held that plaintiffs lacked standing.

== Second Circuit proceedings ==
On February 16, 2018, the dismissal of the suit was appealed by CREW, primarily on an economically informed theory of emolument-related injury to competitors, with all briefs filed by both parties by June 27. Deepak Gupta of Gupta Wessler presented oral argument for the plaintiffs before a three-judge panel of the Second Circuit on October 30, 2018. On September 13, 2019, the U.S. Court of Appeals for the Second Circuit in New York (in a 2 to 1 decision) reinstated the lawsuit and sent it back to the lower court so that the case can move forward. The appellate decision was critical of the July 2019 appellate decision in D.C. and Maryland v. Trump.

In January 2021, the U.S. Supreme Court instructed the lower courts to dismiss the case (and a similar case brought by Maryland and the District of Columbia) as moot, because Trump was no longer president.

On April 23, 2021, the Second Circuit Court of Appeals issued a mandate which dismissed the case.

== See also ==
- D.C. and Maryland v. Trump
- CREW and National Security Archive v. Trump and EOP
- Blumenthal v. Trump
- List of lawsuits involving Donald Trump
- Foreign Emoluments Clause, Article I, Section 9, Clause 8 of United States Constitution
- Domestic Emoluments Clause, Article II, Section 1, Clause 7 of United States Constitution
