= Foreign Emoluments Clause =

Provision of the US Constitution

The Foreign Emoluments Clause is a provision in Article I, Section 9, Clause 8 of the United States Constitution that prohibits the federal government from granting titles of nobility, and restricts federal officials from receiving gifts, emoluments, offices or titles from foreign states and monarchies without the consent of the United States Congress.

Also known as the Titles of Nobility Clause, it was designed to shield the U.S. federal officeholders against so-called "corrupting foreign influences." The clause is reinforced by the corresponding prohibition on state titles of nobility in Article I, Section 10, and more generally by the Republican Guarantee Clause in Article IV, Section 4.

As the Foreign Emoluments Clause has rarely been subject to substantive judicial analysis or interpretation, its exact meaning and scope remain debated; the consensus among legal scholars is that the prohibition applies broadly to all federal officeholders—whether appointed or elected, up to and including the president—and encompasses any kind of profit, benefit, advantage, or services.

== Text ==
No Title of Nobility shall be granted by the United States: And no Person holding any Office of Profit or Trust under them, shall, without the Consent of the Congress, accept of any present, Emolument, Office, or Title, of any kind whatever, from any King, Prince, or foreign State.

== Background ==
It was routine diplomatic practice in Europe for foreign emissaries or diplomats to receive gifts from their host government at the end of their service. In 1651, the Dutch Republic became the first state to forbid foreign ministers from taking "any presents, directly or indirectly, in any manner or way whatever", owing to concerns that such gifts would foster corruption. Dutch diplomat Abraham de Wicquefort criticized the prohibition as being contrary to international legal norms and potentially damaging to foreign relations: "The custom of making a present . . . is so well established that it is of as great an extent as the law of nations itself" and added that the refusal to accept such gifts "condemn[s] the sentiments of all the other kings and potentates of the universe."

The founders of the United States likewise debated how to balance concerns about the corrupting influence of foreign gifts with the desire to conform to established diplomatic protocol, as refusing such gifts could be construed as offensive to host countries. The first governing framework of the U.S., the Articles of Confederation, ratified in 1781, largely adopted the Dutch rule by providing that "any person holding any office of profit or trust under the United States, or any of them" shall not "accept of any present, emolument, office, or title of any kind whatever, from any king, prince, or foreign state." Pursuant to the Articles, Benjamin Franklin, who had received an opulent snuff box from the King of France, sought approval from the Congress of the Confederation to keep the gift, which was granted.

== History ==
The Framers' intentions for this clause were twofold: to prevent a society of nobility from being established in the United States, and to protect the republican forms of government from being influenced by other governments. In Federalist No. 22, Alexander Hamilton stated, "One of the weak sides of republics, among their numerous advantages, is that they afford too easy an inlet to foreign corruption." Therefore, to counter this "foreign corruption" the delegates at the Constitutional Convention worded the clause in such a way as to act as a catch-all for any attempts by foreign governments to influence state or municipal policies through gifts or titles.

The Foreign Emoluments Clause is constitutionally unique in other respects. First, it is a "negative" clause—a restriction prohibiting the passage of legislation for a particular purpose. Such restrictions are unusual in that the Constitution has been historically interpreted to reflect specific (i.e., "positive") sources of power, relinquished by the states in their otherwise sovereign capacities. Moreover, it is a negative clause without a positive converse. A common example of this is how the Commerce Clause represents the positive converse to the restrictions imposed by the Dormant (or "Negative") Commerce Clause. However, neither an express nor implied positive grant of authority exists as a balance against the restrictions imposed by the clause. For this reason, the clause was cited by Anti-Federalists who supported the adoption of a Bill of Rights. Richard Henry Lee warned that such distinctions were inherently dangerous under accepted principles of statutory construction, which would inevitably "give many general undefined powers to congress" if left unchecked.

Why then by a negative clause, restrain congress from doing what it would have no power to do? This clause, then, must have no meaning, or imply, that were it omitted, congress would have the power in question, either upon the principle that some general words in the constitution may be so construed as to give it, or on the principle that congress possesses the powers not expressly reserved. But this clause was in the confederation, and is said to be introduced into the constitution from very great caution. Even a cautionary provision implies a doubt, at least, that it is necessary; and if so in this case, clearly it is also alike necessary in all similar ones.

Lee argued that the true purpose of the clause was merely to protect popular tradition: "The fact appears to be, that the people in forming the confederation, and the convention ... acted naturally; they did not leave the point to be settled by general principles and logical inferences; but they settle the point in a few words, and all who read them at once understand them." Subsequently, the Bill of Rights was promulgated to allay the fears of Anti-Federalists by safeguarding against the expansion of federal power beyond such limited purpose(s).

== Foreign emoluments ==
The prohibition against officers receiving a present or emolument is essentially an antibribery rule to prevent influence by a foreign power. At the Virginia Ratifying Convention, Edmund Randolph, a delegate to the Constitutional Convention, identified the Clause as a key "provision against the danger ... of the president receiving emoluments from foreign powers."

The Department of Justice Office of Legal Counsel has opined that

[t]he language of the Emoluments Clause is both sweeping and unqualified. See 49 Comp. Gen. 819, 821 (1970) (the "drafters [of the Clause] intended the prohibition to have the broadest possible scope and applicability"). It prohibits those holding offices of profit or trust under the United States from accepting "any present, Emolument, Office, or Title, of any kind whatever" from "any ... foreign State" unless Congress consents. U.S. Const, art. I, § 9, cl. 8 (emphasis added). ... The decision whether to permit exceptions that qualify the Clause's absolute prohibition or that temper any harshness it may cause is textually committed to Congress, which may give consent to the acceptance of offices or emoluments otherwise barred by the Clause.

The word "emolument" has a broad meaning. At the time of the Founding, it meant "profit", "benefit", or "advantage" of any kind. Because of the "sweeping and unqualified" nature of the constitutional prohibition, and in light of the more sophisticated understanding of conflicts of interest that developed after the Richard Nixon presidency, most modern presidents have chosen to eliminate any risk of conflict of interest that may arise by choosing to vest their assets into a blind trust.

As the Office of Legal Counsel has advised, the Constitution is violated when the holder of an "Office of Profit or Trust", like the President, receives money from a partnership or similar entity in which he has a stake, and the amount he receives is "a function of the amount paid to the [entity] by the foreign government." This is because such a setup would allow the entity to "in effect be a conduit for that government", and so the government official would be exposed to possible "undue influence and corruption by [the] foreign government." The Department of Defense has expressly held that "this same rationale applies to distributions from limited liability corporations."

=== Presidential ===
==== Traditional treatment ====
Foreign states often present the President of the United States with gifts. While President, George Washington received a painting of, and key to, the Bastille from the Marquis de Lafayette, as "a tribute Which I owe as A Son to My Adoptive father." After leaving office, Washington also took home to Mount Vernon a painting of Louis XIV that he had received as a gift from a French diplomat who had been his aide during the American war of independence. However, nothing is known about Washington's motivations, or whether he considered the emoluments clause to apply to either gift.

Post-Washington Presidents have traditionally sought permission from Congress to keep gifts. Absent permission, the President will deposit the object with the Department of State. For example, Andrew Jackson sought permission from Congress to keep a gold medal presented by Simón Bolívar; Congress refused to grant consent, and so Jackson deposited the medal with the Department of State. Martin Van Buren and John Tyler received gifts from the Imam of Muscat, for which they received congressional authorization either to transfer them to the United States Government or to auction them with proceeds vesting to the United States Treasury. In 1861, Abraham Lincoln accepted an honorary offer of citizenship from the Republic of San Marino without seeking congressional approval.

==== Trump administration ====
The January 2024 report released by the Democratic members of the House Oversight Committee detailing over $7.8 million in payments made by foreign governments to Donald Trump during his presidency

American politician and associate professor of law at Fordham University Zephyr Teachout has argued that the extensive business and real estate dealings of President Donald Trump, especially with respect to government agencies in other countries, may fall within the clause's scope, but Irish law lecturer Seth Barrett Tillman, of Maynooth University in Ireland, has written that the restriction may not apply to the president, based upon his reading of possible exceptions made during George Washington's administration. Tillman also wrote that "In order to ensure against ethical conflicts, both real and perceived, Trump should place his interests in those holdings beyond his personal control, i.e., into an independently managed blind trust. Such a move would be wise and consistent with America's best political traditions and practices."

After China provisionally granted 38 "Trump" trademarks in March 2017, Democratic senators protested Trump's acceptance of the trademarks without congressional approval. In December 2018, there were reports of Saudi Arabia indirectly funneling funds to Donald Trump through Trump businesses, such as his hotels, that may be in breach of the Emoluments Clause.

The group Citizens for Responsibility and Ethics in Washington, including former White House lawyers Norm Eisen and Richard Painter, filed a lawsuit against Trump alleging violations of the clause, including the acceptance of the Chinese trademarks. One of these lawsuits, Blumenthal v. Trump, was dismissed on standing grounds by the United States Court of Appeals for the District of Columbia Circuit. Two other lawsuits, CREW v. Trump and D.C. and Maryland v. Trump, were dismissed as moot on January 25, 2021, by the Supreme Court vacating lower court decisions that went against Trump, because he was no longer in office. The court's decision effectively ended all litigation against Trump on the emoluments issue.

In January 2024, Democratic members of the U.S. House Committee on Oversight and Accountability released their White House for Sale: How Princes, Prime Ministers, and Premiers Paid Off President Trump report detailing over $7.8 million in payments from foreign governments to Trump-owned businesses. After Republicans took control of the House in the 2022 midterm elections, the committee stopped requesting financial records from Trump's accounting firm, Mazars, leading the report to assume that additional payments had occurred.

In May 2025, the Trump administration expressed its intention to accept P4-HBJ, a Boeing 747-8 jumbo jet requested from the royal family of Qatar for use as the new Air Force One. With an estimated value of US$400 million, this would be the most valuable gift ever extended to the United States from a foreign government. Although the gift will first be transferred to the Department of Defense and subsequently to the Trump presidential library foundation, it still could be in violation of the Emoluments Clause. On May 12, an extensive media report about controversy arising over the gift made note that conservative political blogger and radio host Erick Erickson criticized the plan by Trump to accept the Qatar airplane and that he provided "widely held criticisms of the gift" by other conservatives to his followers. On May 28 the Washington Post reported that no deal had been agreed because Qatar required a memorandum of understanding confirming that any transfer make it clear that the request had been initiated by the United States in order to ensure that Qatar had no legal liability. On July 7, 2025, Pete Hegseth signed the memorandum of understanding.

=== Retired military ===
Under interpretations of the Emoluments Clause elaborated by the Comptroller General of the United States and the U.S. Department of Justice Office of Legal Counsel (but which have never been tested in court) retired military personnel are forbidden from receiving employment, consulting fees, gifts, travel expenses, honoraria, or salary from foreign governments without prior consent from Congress. Per section 908 of title 37 of the United States Code, this requires advance approval from the Secretary of State and the Secretary of the relevant branch of the Armed Services. Retired military officers have voiced concerns through the Retired Officers Association that applying the clause to themselves but not to retired civil service members is not an equal application of the clause, and therefore unconstitutional.

In 1942, Congress authorized members of the armed forces to accept any "decorations, orders, medals and emblems" offered by allied nations during the course of World War II or up to one year following its conclusion. Notably, Gen. Dwight D. Eisenhower accepted a number of titles and awards pursuant to this authorization after the fall of Nazi Germany, including a knighthood in Denmark's highest order of chivalry, the Order of the Elephant.

Congress has also consented in advance to the receipt from foreign governments by officials of the United States government (including military personnel) of a variety of gifts, subject to a variety of conditions, in the Foreign Gifts and Decorations Act and section 108A of the Mutual Educational and Cultural Exchange Act, otherwise known as the Fulbright–Hays Act of 1961. Under these rules numerous foreign decorations have been awarded to American military and civilian personnel, such as for diplomatic service or during the Vietnam and Gulf Wars. Presidents Obama and Trump both received the Collar of the Order of Abdulaziz Al Saud from Saudi Arabia, a decoration frequently given to heads of state.

The New York Times has reported that, according to two defense officials, the Army is investigating whether Michael T. Flynn "received money from the Russian government during a trip he took to Moscow in 2015" while he was a government official. According to the officials, there was no record that Flynn has "filed the required paperwork for the trip", as required by the Emoluments Clause.

== Titles of nobility ==
The issue of titles was of serious importance to the American Revolutionaries and the Framers of the Constitution. Some felt that titles of nobility had no place in an equal and just society because they clouded people's judgment. Thomas Paine, in a criticism on nobility in general, wrote:

Dignities and high sounding names have different effects on different beholders. The lustre of the Star and the title of My Lord, over-awe the superstitious vulgar, and forbid them to inquire into the character of the possessor: Nay more, they are, as it were, bewitched to admire in the great, the vices they would honestly condemn in themselves. This sacrifice of common sense is the certain badge which distinguishes slavery from freedom; for when men yield up the privilege of thinking, the last shadow of liberty quits the horizon.

Paine felt that titles blinded people from seeing the true character of a person by providing titled individuals a lustre. Many Americans connected titles with the corruption that they had experienced from Great Britain, while others, like Benjamin Franklin, did not have as negative a view of titles. He felt that if a title is ascending, that is, it is achieved through hard work during a person's lifetime, it is good because it encourages the title holder's posterity to aspire to achieve the same or greater title; however, Franklin commented, that if a title is descending, that is, it is passed down from the title holder to his posterity, then it is:

groundless and absurd, but often hurtful to that Posterity, since it is apt to make them proud, disdaining to be employ'd in useful Arts, and thence falling into Poverty, and all the Meannesses, Servility, and Wretchedness attending it; which is the present case with much of what is called the Noblesse in Europe.

=== President's title ===
One of the first issues that the United States Senate dealt with was the title of president. Vice President John Adams called the senators' attention to this pressing procedural matter. Most senators were averse to calling the president anything that resembled the titles of European monarchs, yet John Adams proceeded to recommend the title "His Highness, the President of the United States, and Protector of their Liberties," an attempt to imitate the titles of the British monarch ("By the Grace of God, of Great Britain, France and Ireland, King, Defender of the Faith, Prince-Elector of Hannover, Duke of Brunswick") and the French monarch ("By the Grace of God, Most Christian King of France and Navarre."

Some senators favored "His Elective Majesty" or "His Excellency" (the latter of which would become the standard form of address for elected presidents of later republics). James Madison, a member of the House of Representatives, declared that the European titles were ill-suited for the "genius of the people" and "the nature of our Government". Washington became completely embarrassed with the topic and so the senators dropped it; subsequently, the president would simply be called the "President of the United States" or "Mr. President", drawing a sharp distinction between American and European customs.

Under the rules of etiquette, the President, Vice President, members of both houses of Congress, governors of states, members of state legislatures, and mayors are accorded the title "The Honorable".

Internationally, the President is referred to as His Excellency.

=== Titles of Nobility Amendment ===
In 1810, Democratic–Republican Senator Philip Reed of Maryland introduced a Constitutional amendment expanding upon this clause's ban on titles of nobility. Under the terms of this amendment, any United States citizen who accepted, claimed, received or retained any title of nobility from a foreign government would be stripped of their U.S. citizenship. After being approved by the Senate on April 27, 1810, by a vote of 19–5. and the House of Representatives on May 1, 1810, by a vote of 87–3, the amendment, titled "Article Thirteen", was sent to the state legislatures for ratification. On two occasions between 1812 and 1816 it was within two states of the number needed to become a valid part of the Constitution. As Congress did not set a time limit for its ratification, the amendment is still technically pending before the states. Currently, ratification by an additional 26 states would be necessary for this amendment to be adopted.
