= D.C. and Maryland v. Trump =

Lawsuit concerning emoluments

- Court: United States District Court for the District of Maryland
- Decided: Dismissed as moot (January 25, 2021) 592 U.S. 20-331
- Defendant: Donald Trump
- Counsel for plaintiffs: Natalie O Ludaway; Steven M Sullivan; Patrick Hughes
- Plaintiffs: The District of Columbia; The State of Maryland
- Citation: No. 8:17-cv-01596

Court membership
- Judge sitting: Peter Jo Messitte

D.C. and Maryland v. Trump was a lawsuit filed on June 12, 2017, in the United States District Court for the District of Maryland. The plaintiffs, the U.S. state of Maryland and the District of Columbia, alleged that the defendant, President Donald Trump, had violated the Foreign Emoluments Clause of the United States Constitution by accepting gifts from foreign governments. The lawsuit was filed by D.C. Attorney General Karl Racine and Maryland Attorney General Brian Frosh.

The suit alleged that Trump had committed "unprecedented constitutional violations" by not disentangling his business interests from his presidential responsibilities. The attorneys general cited the Trump International Hotel's effect on business in the Washington D.C. area as one reason for filing the lawsuit. The suit sought an injunction to stop Trump from violating the emoluments clause of the Constitution. The attorneys general stated they would seek Trump's tax returns as part of their case.

A three-judge panel of the Fourth Circuit Court of Appeals dismissed the case in July 2019, ruling that the attorneys general lacked legal standing to sue. All three of the judges were appointed by Republican presidents. New arguments in an en banc rehearing of the appeal were heard on December 12, 2019.

On May 14, 2020, the full Fourth Circuit Court of Appeals rejected the defense's attempt to have the case dismissed on the grounds of presidential immunity by a 9-to-6 majority, reviving the lawsuit. On January 25, 2021, five days after Trump left office, the Supreme Court of the United States issued a summary disposition ordering the Fourth Circuit to dismiss the case as moot.

== Context ==
The Maryland filing follows a lawsuit filed in January 2017 by Citizens for Responsibility and Ethics in Washington in the United States District Court for the Southern District of New York, CREW v. Trump, which also alleged that Trump has violated the emoluments clause. The D.C. and Maryland lawsuit is the first time a government entity has sued a president for violating the clause.

In response to the lawsuit on the day of the filing, White House Press Secretary Sean Spicer stated that the president was not in violation of the emoluments cause, and would "move to dismiss this case", which Spicer characterized as "partisan politics". Spicer noted that both attorneys general filing the suit are Democrats. Republican National Committee spokesperson Lindsay Jancek also stated that President Trump was in compliance with the law, and called the lawsuit "absurd".

President Trump was served on June 27, 2017. On November 28, 2017, the plaintiffs won the right to subpoena documents from the Trump Organization, forcing it to retain any documents relevant to the suit.

On July 25, 2018, Federal District Judge Peter Messitte allowed the case to proceed; denying DOJ's motion to dismiss. The Justice Department argued that the clause was not relevant to Trump's businesses. On November 2, Judge Messitte ordered discovery to begin. On December 3, Maryland and the District of Columbia issued subpoenas for Trump's financial records related to his D.C. hotel. Days later the Fourth Circuit Court of Appeals granted the DOJ's request for a stay, halting the subpoena of documents, pending the outcome of a hearing scheduled for March 2019.

In December 2018, Maryland prosecutors subpoenaed financial documents of the Trump Organization's golf resorts in Scotland.

At a hearing on March 18, 2019, a three-judge panel of the Fourth Circuit Court of Appeals was sharply skeptical of the legal basis of the suit, and dismissed the case on July 10, 2019. The plaintiffs' motion for rehearing en banc (before the entire Court) were granted, with oral arguments held on December 12. On May 14, 2020, the full Fourth Circuit Court of Appeals vacated the panel decision and revived the lawsuit, rejecting (by 9-to-6 vote) the defense's attempt to have the case dismissed on the grounds of "presidential immunity". The parallel CREW v. Trump case, which was brought in New York federal court, was also reinstated in September 2019.

On January 25, 2021, the U.S. Supreme Court ruled that both cases were now moot, on the grounds that Trump was no longer president, ordering the lower courts to dismiss them.

On May 11, 2021, the Second Circuit Court of Appeals dismissed the case.

== See also ==
- CREW v. Trump
- Blumenthal v. Trump
- List of lawsuits involving Donald Trump
- Timeline of investigations into Trump and Russia (2019)
