= Brendan Hurson =

American judge (born 1977)

Brendan A. Hurson
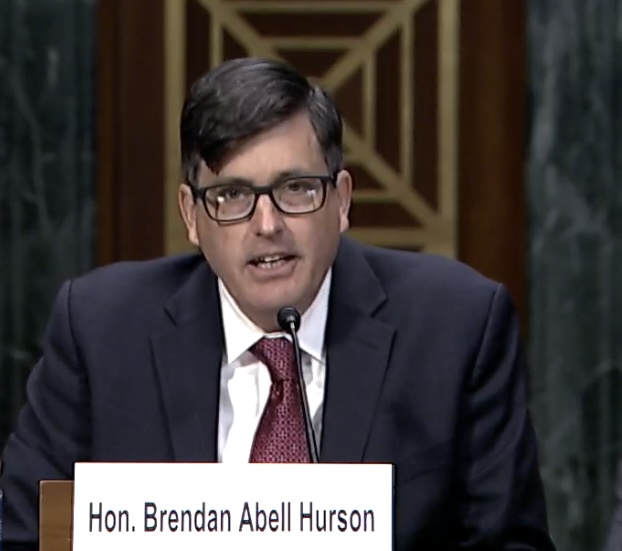

Judge of the United States District Court for the District of Maryland
- Incumbent
- Assumed office October 6, 2023
- Appointed by: Joe Biden
- Preceded by: George J. Hazel

Magistrate Judge of the United States District Court for the District of Maryland
- In office February 7, 2022 – October 6, 2023
- Preceded by: Deborah Boardman
- Succeeded by: Charles D. Austin

Personal details
- Born: Brendan Abell Hurson; 1977 (age 48–49) Washington, D.C., U.S.
- Education: Providence College (BA); University of Maryland (JD)

Brendan Abell Hurson (born 1977) is an American lawyer from Maryland who is serving as a United States district judge of the United States District Court for the District of Maryland. He previously served as a United States magistrate judge of the same court from 2022 to 2023.

== Education ==
Hurson received a Bachelor of Arts from Providence College, cum laude, in 2000 and a Juris Doctor with honors, from University of Maryland School of Law in 2005. Hurson served in the Jesuit Volunteer Corps in California and then taught middle school at St. Thomas More School in Washington, D.C.

== Career ==
From 2005 to 2006, Hurson served as a law clerk for Judge Margaret B. Seymour of the United States District Court for the District of South Carolina. From 2006 to 2007, he was an associate at Schulman, Hershfield, and Gilden, P.A. in Baltimore. He served as an assistant federal public defender and senior litigation counsel in the Office of the Federal Public Defender for the District of Maryland from 2007 to 2017 and again from 2018 to 2022. He also served as an Assistant Federal Public Defender in the Office of the Federal Public Defender for the Virgin Islands from 2017 to 2018. He was appointed as a United States magistrate judge on February 7, 2022.

=== Notable cases ===
In 2014, Hurson represented Master Giddins, who was charged with bank robbery and conspiracy. Giddins was accused of robbing a Baltimore M&T Bank dressed as a woman when he walked into the bank, handed the teller a note saying he had a bomb and demanded money. He was sentenced to 17 years in prison.

In 2021, Hurson represented Dequan Forde, who was charged with smuggling marijuana into the Virgin Islands. He was arrested after arriving at Henry E. Rohlsen Airport on a flight from Miami and an inspection found approximately 20 pounds of marijuana in his luggage. Forde plead guilty under an agreement with prosecutors. He was sentenced to eight months in federal prison.

=== Federal judicial service ===
On March 20, 2023, President Joe Biden announced his intent to nominate Hurson to serve as a United States district judge of the United States District Court for the District of Maryland. On March 21, 2023, his nomination was sent to the Senate. President Biden nominated Hurson to the seat vacated by Judge George J. Hazel, who resigned on February 24, 2023. On April 18, 2023, a hearing on his nomination was held before the Senate Judiciary Committee. On May 11, 2023, his nomination was reported out of committee by a 12–9 vote. On October 4, 2023, the United States Senate invoked cloture on his nomination by a 54–44 vote. Later that day, his nomination was confirmed by a 53–44 vote. He received his judicial commission on October 6, 2023. He was sworn in on October 11, 2023.

Legal offices
| Preceded by George J. Hazel | Judge of the United States District Court for the District of Maryland; 2023–present | Incumbent |
