= Angela Alsobrooks =

American politician and lawyer (born 1971)

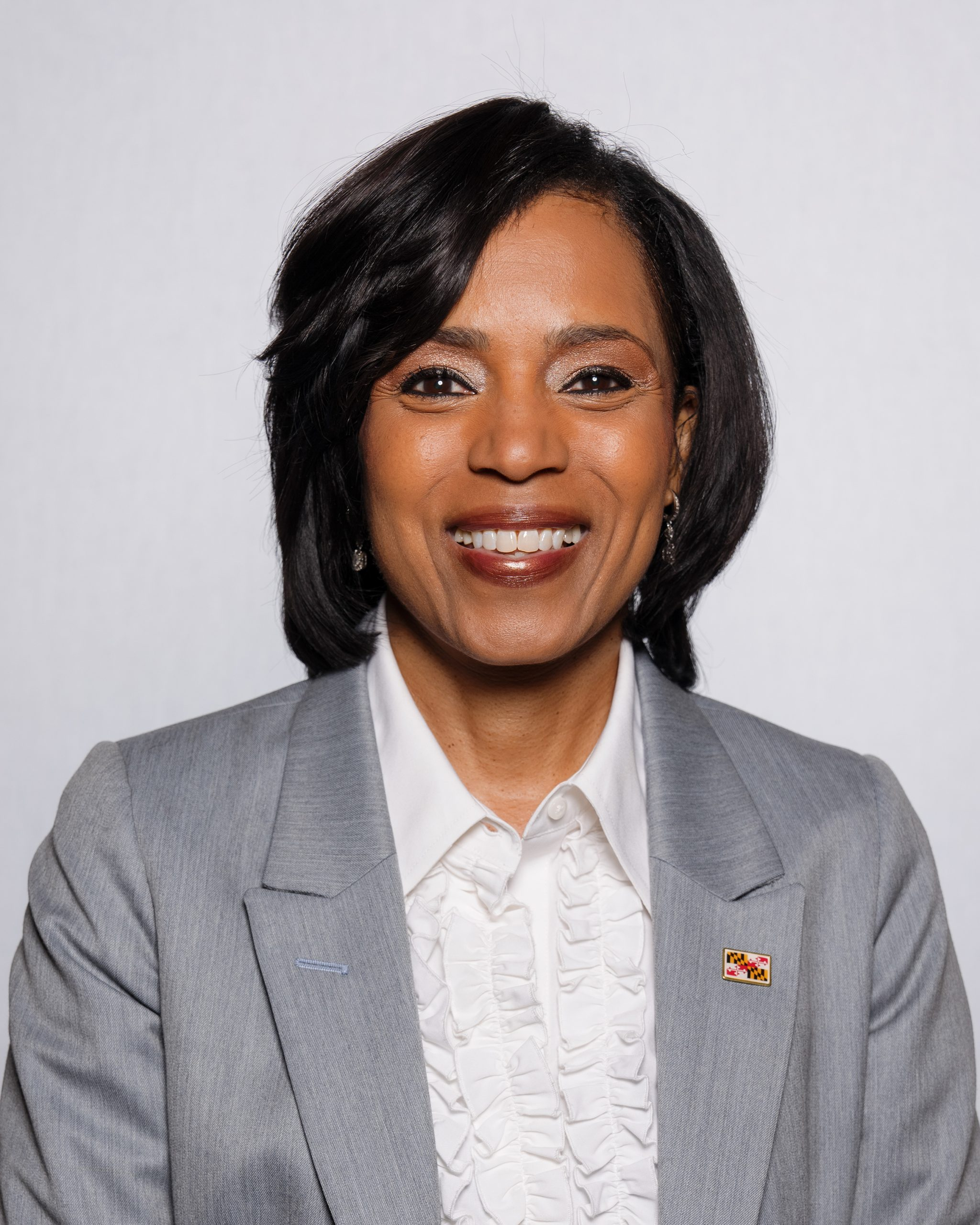
- Official portrait, 2025

United States Senator from Maryland
- Incumbent
- Assumed office January 3, 2025 Serving with Chris Van Hollen
- Preceded by: Ben Cardin

8th Executive of Prince George's County
- In office December 3, 2018 – December 2, 2024
- Preceded by: Rushern Baker
- Succeeded by: Tara Jackson (acting)

State's Attorney of Prince George's County
- In office January 3, 2011 – December 3, 2018
- Preceded by: Glenn Ivey
- Succeeded by: Aisha Braveboy

Personal details
- Born: Angela Deneece Alsobrooks; February 23, 1971 (age 55) Suitland, Maryland, U.S.
- Party: Democratic
- Children: 1
- Education: Duke University (BA); University of Maryland, Baltimore (JD)
- Website: Senate website Campaign website
- Alsobrooks' voice Alsobrooks on her early life and political career Recorded May 24, 2021

Angela Deneece Alsobrooks (born February 23, 1971) is an American lawyer and politician serving since 2025 as the junior United States senator from Maryland. A member of the Democratic Party, she served from 2011 to 2018 as state's attorney for Prince George's County and from 2018 to 2024 as county executive of Prince George's County. She was Prince George's County's first female county executive and the first Black female county executive in Maryland history.

Born and raised in Prince George's County, Alsobrooks graduated from Duke University and the University of Maryland School of Law. She began her career as an attorney for local firms before becoming involved in county government as a domestic violence prosecutor and appointed official in county executive Jack B. Johnson's administration. She was elected state's attorney of Prince George's County in 2010 and 2014 and Prince George's County Executive in 2018 and 2022.

Alsobrooks was elected to the U.S. Senate in 2024, defeating former Republican governor Larry Hogan in the general election. She is Maryland's first African-American senator and the third African-American woman elected to the U.S. Senate. (Note: Alsobrooks is the fourth female African-American U.S. senator overall following Carol Moseley Braun of Illinois, Kamala Harris of California, and Laphonza Butler of California. Alsobrooks was also elected alongside Lisa Blunt Rochester of Delaware, marking the first time in U.S. history that two African-American women served in the U.S. Senate simultaneously.) She is the second woman to represent Maryland in the Senate, after Barbara Mikulski.

== Early life and career ==
=== Early life and education ===
Angela Deneece Alsobrooks was born in Suitland, Maryland, on February 23, 1971, to James Alsobrooks, who worked as a distributor for The Washington Post and was a car salesman, and Patricia Alsobrooks (née James), a receptionist. Her family moved from Seneca, South Carolina to Maryland in July 1956 shortly after her great-grandfather, J. C. James, was shot and killed by police officer Charles Lee while resisting arrest. Lee was not charged in James's death after a coroner's jury found that he had acted in self-defense after the two began to scuffle as Lee attempted to arrest James for creating a disturbance. Alsobrooks has said that her surname is of West African or Native American origin.

Alsobrooks was raised in Camp Springs, Maryland, and attended Benjamin Banneker High School in Washington, D.C. She earned her Bachelor of Arts degree in public policy and Afro-American studies at Duke University in 1993, and her Juris Doctor degree from the University of Maryland School of Law of the University of Maryland, Baltimore in 1996.

=== Early career ===
After she was admitted to the Maryland Bar in 1996, Alsobrooks clerked for law firms DLA Piper and DeCaro, Doran, and for Circuit Court Judges William D. Quarles Jr. and Donna Hill Staton until 1997, when she began working as an assistant state's attorney in Prince George's County. She was assigned to handle domestic violence cases as an assistant state's attorney. She left the state's attorney office in 2002 to become education liaison for Prince George's County Executive Jack B. Johnson. In 2003, she was appointed executive director of the county revenue authority.

Alsobrooks first got involved in politics while serving as the president of her high school's student government. She later worked as an intern for U.S. House Delegate Eleanor Holmes Norton. Alsobrooks attended the 1992 Democratic National Convention as an intern to the Congressional Black Caucus and volunteered for Democratic nominee Bill Clinton's presidential campaign. In 2000, she worked on the presidential campaign of Vice President Al Gore. In 2008, Alsobrooks ran for delegate to the Democratic National Convention, pledged to U.S. Senator Hillary Clinton. After the convention she supported Democratic nominee Barack Obama. At the 2016 Democratic National Convention, she was a delegate pledged to Clinton.

In 2009, Alsobrooks became involved with electoral politics when she filed to run for Prince George's state's attorney after reading a profile of District Attorney of San Francisco Kamala Harris in Essence Magazine, and her book Smart on Crime. Harris supported Alsobrooks's campaign for state's attorney.

== Prince George's State's Attorney ==
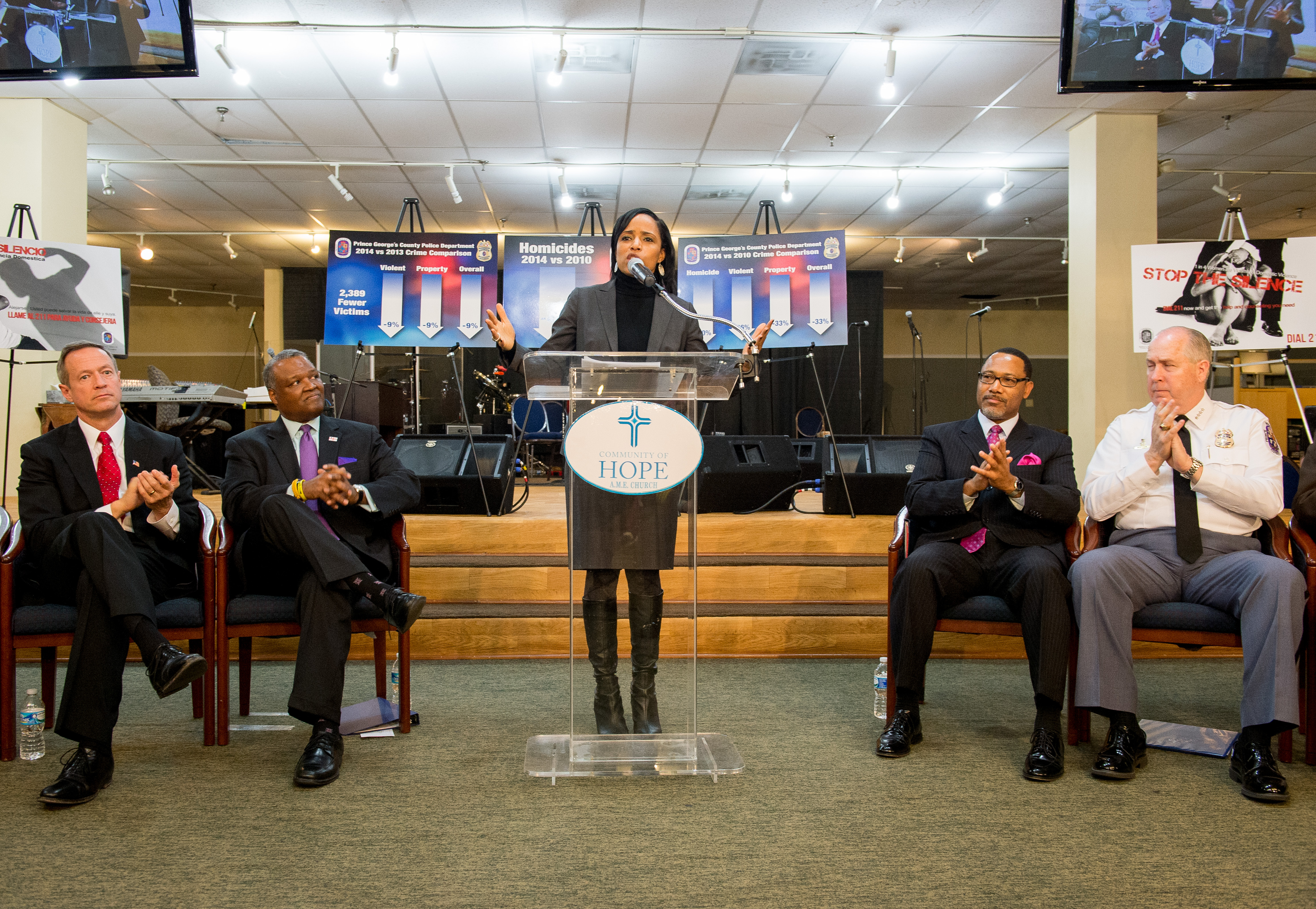
Alsobrooks as Prince George's County State's Attorney in 2015

Alsobrooks was first elected Prince George's state's attorney in 2010, and reelected in 2014. She is the first woman and youngest person to serve as state's attorney in county history. In the 2010 election Alsobrooks ran with the support of Maryland Secretary of Aging Gloria G. Lawlah, county executives Wayne K. Curry and Jack B. Johnson, and incumbent state's attorney Glenn Ivey, while running on a slate with former state delegate Rushern Baker.

As state's attorney, Alsobrooks took what was seen as a tough-on-crime approach while also supporting a rehabilitative approach for juveniles in the criminal justice system. During her time in office, the violent crime rate in the county declined by 50%, in line with national trends. Alsobrooks also increased prosecutions for car break-ins, vandalism, and burglaries, and personally prosecuted Richmond Phillips, who was sentenced to life without parole for killing his mistress and their daughter; and Daron Boswell-Johnson, who was sentenced to two life sentences after killing his two-year-old daughter and her mother. She supported initiatives by county executive Rushern Baker to concentrate government resources in communities struggling with social problems and to take control of the Prince George's County school system, which she accredited to a decrease in crime in the county. A Special Prosecutions Unit was created within her office to handle economic crimes, public corruption, and police misconduct cases.

Alsobrooks sought and secured funding to increase the number of attorneys in the office and increased conviction rates. She also divided her office's prosecutors into the county's six police districts to handle cases specific to each region, and concentrated on addressing quality-of-life concerns, discouraging truancy, and increasing social services. Alsobrooks worked with Kamala Harris, then California Attorney General, to implement a program to reduce recidivism in Prince George's County, mirroring the "Back on Track" program Harris introduced in California.

== Prince George's County Executive ==
=== Elections ===
==== 2018 ====
Alsobrooks announced her intention to run for county executive on July 28, 2017. Her platform included increasing education funding, expanding the commercial tax base, and improving public safety by increasing police hires. During the primary, Alsobrooks was endorsed by The Washington Post, U.S. senator Chris Van Hollen, U.S. representatives Anthony Brown and Steny Hoyer, and numerous labor unions. Alsobrooks won the Democratic primary election with 61.8% of the vote, defeating eight other candidates, including former U.S. Representative Donna Edwards and state senator C. Anthony Muse. She faced Republican Jerry Mathis in the general election, who later dropped out and endorsed Alsobrooks on August 29, 2018, allowing her to run without any formal opposition and earning 98.9% of the vote in the general election.

==== 2022 ====
Alsobrooks was seen as a possible candidate for the 2022 Maryland gubernatorial election, but she instead chose to run for re-election as county executive in 2022. She endorsed Wes Moore in the Democratic primary on March 5, 2022, which was later described as "the most vital endorsement" for Moore's campaign. Following Moore's victory in the general election, Alsobrooks was named as a co-chair on the transition teams of both Moore and Comptroller-elect Brooke Lierman.

=== Tenure ===
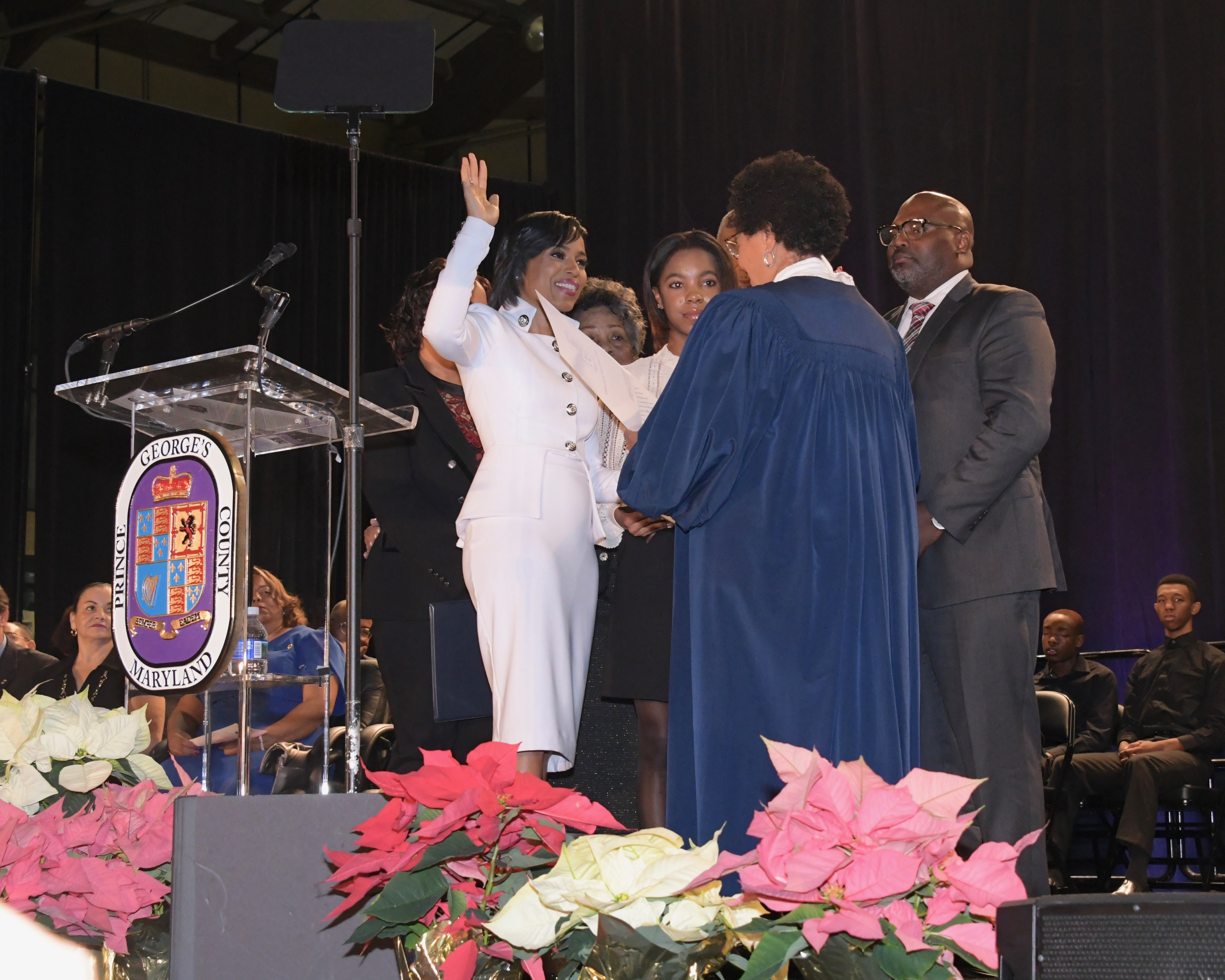
Alsobrooks being sworn in as county executive, 2018

Alsobrooks was sworn in on December 3, 2018, becoming the first woman to be elected county executive for Prince George's County as well as the first Black woman to serve as county executive in Maryland.

In July 2019, Alsobrooks traveled to Detroit, Michigan, to lend moral support to Harris during one of the televised presidential debates, bringing her teenage daughter along. In May 2020, Alsobrooks was named co-chair of the Maryland Women for Biden group, alongside House Speaker Adrienne A. Jones, Senate President pro tempore Melony G. Griffith, and Maryland Democratic Party Chair Yvette Lewis. She was a delegate pledged to Biden at the 2020 Democratic National Convention and later attended the inauguration of Joe Biden on January 20, 2021. Alsobrooks was the keynote speaker during the 2024 Democratic National Convention, during which she also served as a delegate to the 2024 Democratic National Convention pledged to Harris.

During her tenure as county executive, Alsobrooks faced criticism from Latino officials for not appointing a single person of Hispanic descent to her 39-member cabinet, despite Latinos making up 21.2% of the county's population. In statements to The Washington Post, she acknowledged that more could be done to include Latinos in her government, and members of her office said that the administration often does not receive Latino applicants for appointable positions. Following this criticism, Alsobrooks appointed Manuel Castillo as chief information security officer, created the Office of Multicultural Affairs, and made Spanish translations of county documents more accessible. She later claimed that Latino representation in the county's workforce had increased from 6% to 23% during her tenure.

After her election to the U.S. Senate, Alsobrooks resigned as county executive on December 2, 2024. The county's chief administrative officer, Tara Jackson, became the acting county executive upon her resignation. A special election for county executive was on June 3, 2025. Alsobrooks endorsed at-large county councilmember Calvin Hawkins, who was defeated in the Democratic primary by Prince George's County State's Attorney Aisha Braveboy. Braveboy won the general election, defeating Republican nominee Johnathan White with 91.2% of the vote.

=== COVID-19 pandemic ===
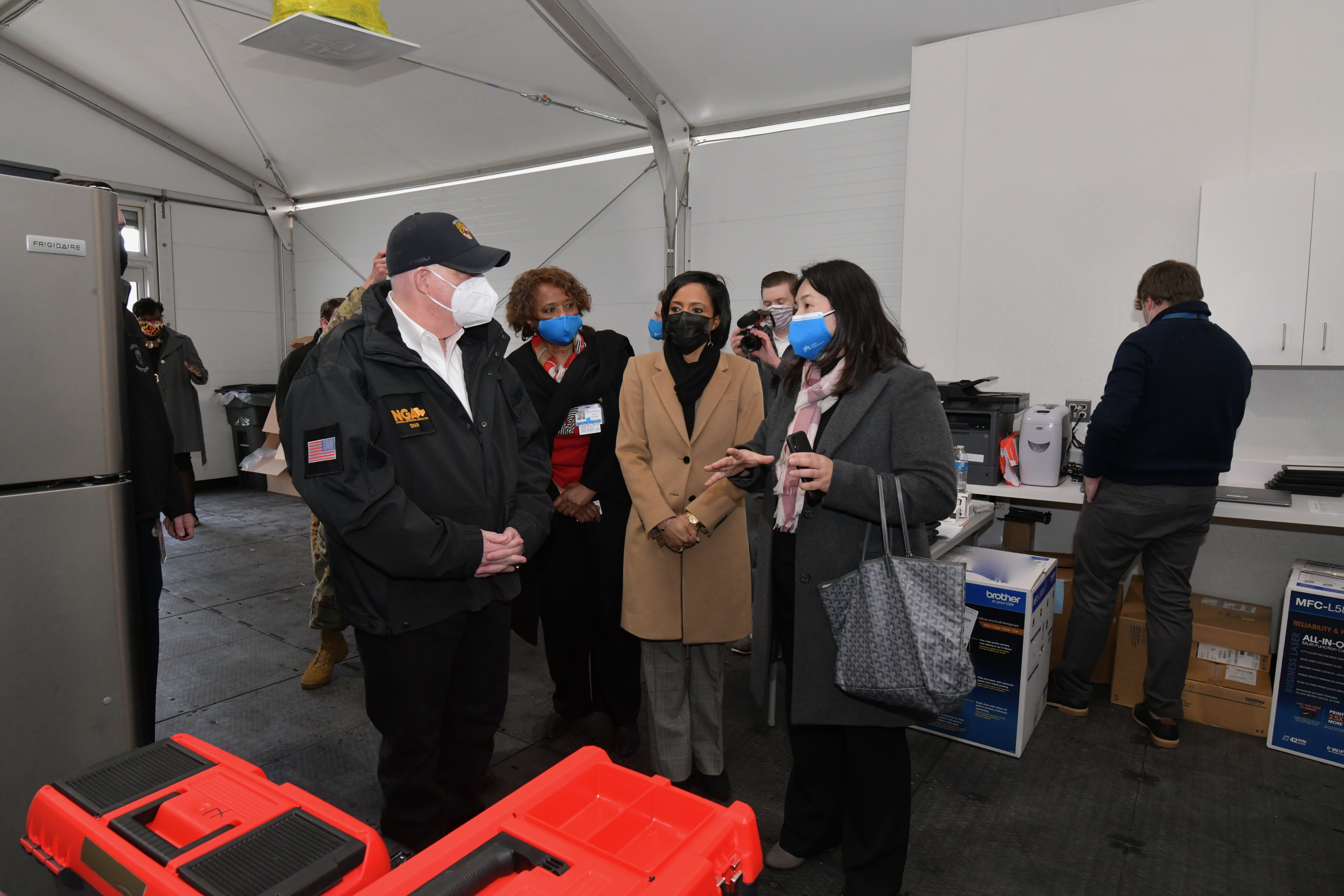
Alsobrooks (center) tours the Six Flags America mass vaccination site with Governor Larry Hogan, 2021

On March 9, 2020, Alsobrooks announced that Prince George's County had recorded its first case of COVID-19. She soon ordered the closing of all county buildings and on March 27 opened the county's first COVID-19 testing site at FedExField. Prince George's was the Maryland county hit hardest by the pandemic, with 74,704 cases and 1,317 deaths by March 2021.

In April 2020, Alsobrooks praised Larry Hogan's administration for its acquisition of 500,000 test kits from South Korea through Operation Enduring Friendship, later requesting 90,000 of these test kits for Prince George's County residents. In May 2020, as hospitalizations began to plateau statewide, Alsobrooks expressed concern with the state's potential plans to begin easing some COVID-19-related restrictions, citing health department reports showing that the county was still dealing with a surge in COVID-19 patients. Later that month, Alsobrooks provided $8 million for a county rent assistance program to assist individuals affected by the COVID-19 pandemic. She also joined almost every other county executive in sending a letter to Hogan warning that their jurisdictions "lack sufficient resources" to take steps to reopen in the weeks ahead. Alsobrooks announced on May 28, 2020, that the county would begin its "incremental opening", and would form a "Prince George's Forward" task force to help the county recover from the pandemic going forward. The county entered its second phase of reopening on June 15, 2020.

In July 2020, following an increase in cases in the county, Alsobrooks created the COVID-19 Ambassador Compliance Team to make sure establishments followed the county's COVID-19-related restrictions. As cases continued to increase, she initially declined to implement any new restrictions before setting a 50-person limit on social gatherings the following day. In September 2020, Alsobrooks declined to move into phase three of reopening, pointing out that 13 ZIP codes in the county had a positivity rate of five percent or higher. In November 2020, Alsobrooks announced new capacity limits at bars, gyms, and restaurants in Prince George's County amid a spike in COVID-19 cases.

In January 2021, Alsobrooks announced that the county health department would cancel any vaccination appointments scheduled after February 9 as part of a "reset" after noticing that people from neighboring counties were crossing into Prince George's to get the COVID-19 vaccine. In February 2021, she launched a "Proud to be Protected" campaign with local hospitals and non-profits to tackle vaccine misinformation and encourage residents to get vaccinated, and later joined statewide efforts to do the same. In May 2021, Alsobrooks lifted most of the county's COVID-19 restrictions, citing a decline in COVID-19 cases. She also joined local leaders in sending a letter to Governor Hogan encouraging him to impose a temporary statewide eviction moratorium to give local jurisdictions more time to set up rent relief programs. In August 2021, Alsobrooks reinstated the county's indoor mask mandate following an increase in COVID-19 cases from the Delta variant. The county's mask mandate was lifted on February 28, 2022.

== U.S. Senate ==
=== Elections ===
==== 2024 ====
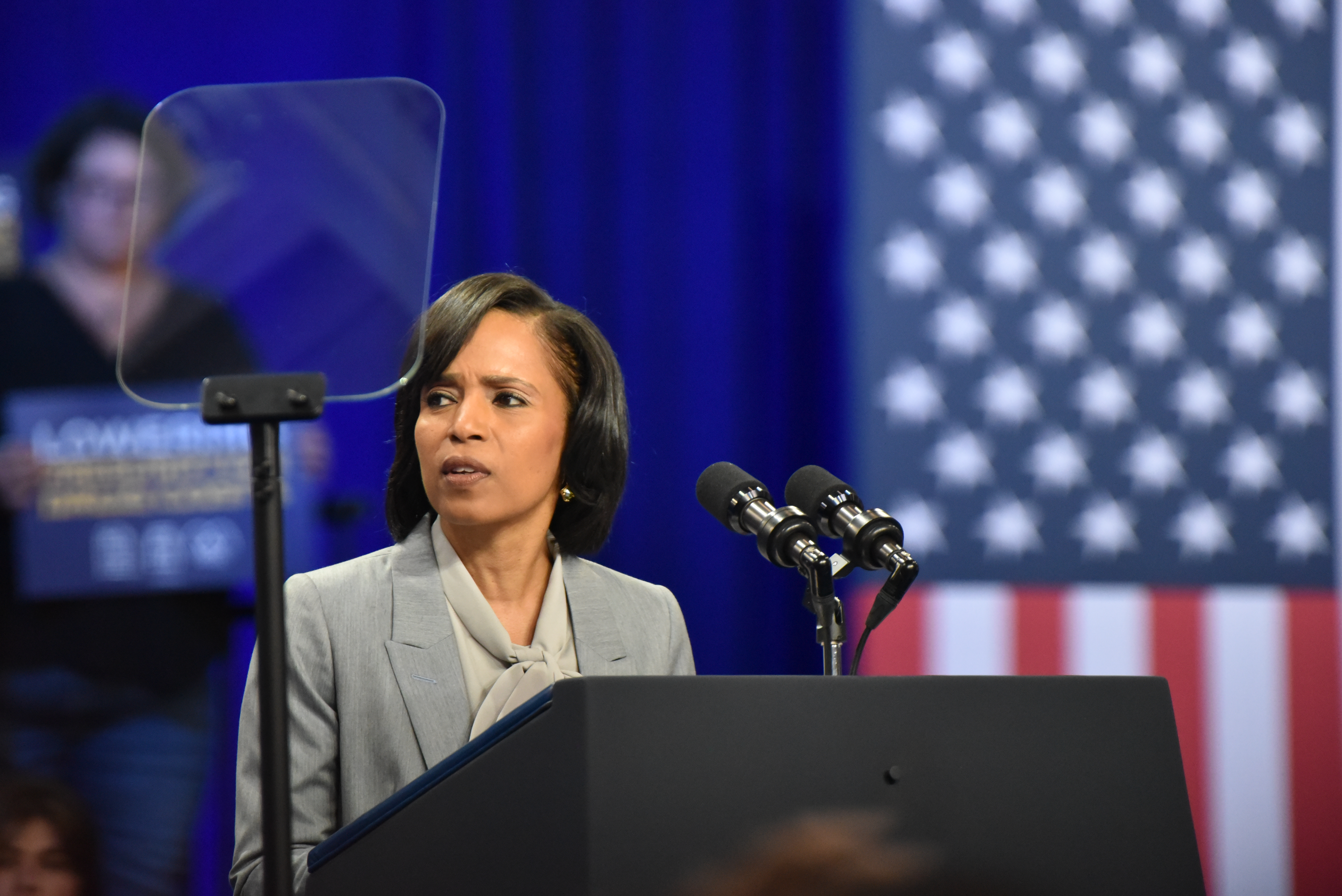
Alsobrooks speaks at a campaign rally in August 2024

On May 9, 2023, Alsobrooks announced her candidacy in the 2024 election for the U.S. Senate from Maryland. During the Democratic primary, she ran on a platform emphasizing "kitchen-table" issues, such as community safety and health care, while also focusing on her political career as a prosecutor and county executive. She also campaigned heavily in the Baltimore metropolitan area, which was viewed as a key battleground area in the primary and general elections. Media outlets saw Alsobrooks as an early front-runner. She received several high-profile endorsements from the Maryland Democratic political establishment early in her candidacy, including from Chris Van Hollen, Steny Hoyer, Wes Moore, and multiple state legislators and county executives.

The Democratic primary developed into a "contest between money and endorsements", with Alsobrooks receiving the most individual donations while her closest competitor, David Trone, largely self-financed his campaign with $61.7 million and outspent Alsobrooks 10-to-1 as of May 2024. Trone used his money to fund a media blitz across the state. As a result, the Alsobrooks campaign employed campaign events to meet with potential supporters directly and waited until the primary's final weeks to run a slew of advertisements introducing her to voters, touting her achievements in office, and promoting her endorsements.

Alsobrooks trailed Trone in opinion polls for most of the primary, but had a surge of support in its final weeks as voters tuned in and Trone's campaign suffered from various gaffes he had made on the campaign trail. She won the primary on May 14, 2024, with 54% of the vote. Her support largely came from the state's most populous and urban counties, especially in her home base of Prince George's County, while Trone's support came mostly from Maryland's rural areas and Frederick County. Alsobrooks faced Hogan in the general election. She scrutinized Hogan's legislative record, sought to associate him with former President Donald Trump, and sought to remind voters that a Hogan victory would lead to Republican control of the U.S. Senate. She led Hogan in general-election polling, but by a smaller margin than Democrats usually have in Maryland. Alsobrooks defeated Hogan on November 5 with 54.6% of the vote.

=== Tenure ===
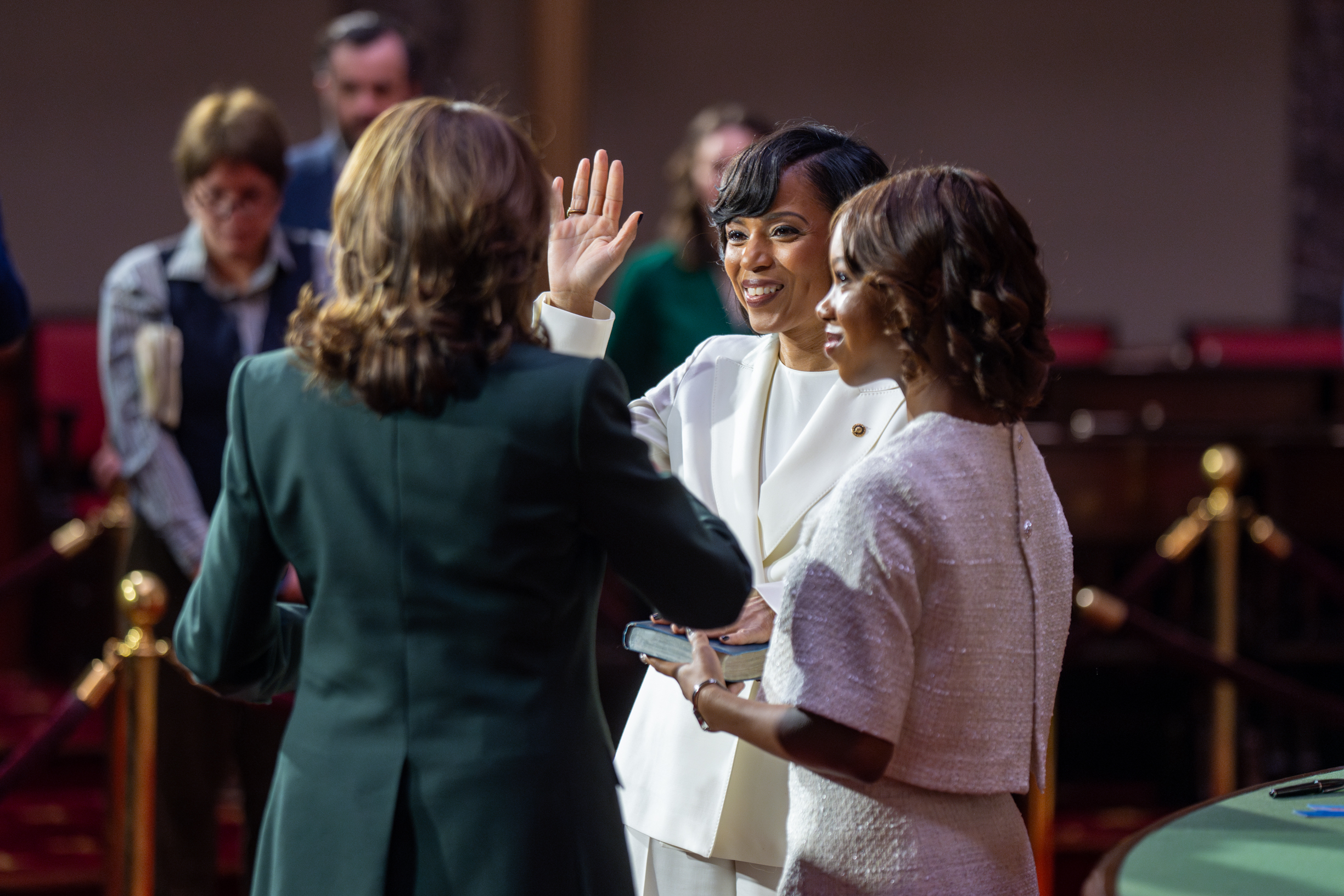
Alsobrooks being sworn in as senator from Maryland by Vice President Kamala Harris, with her daughter Alex

Alsobrooks was sworn in on January 3, 2025. She is the first Black senator from Maryland, the first woman to represent Maryland in Congress since Barbara Mikulski's and Donna Edwards's retirements in 2017, and the third Black woman ever elected to the Senate. Alsobrooks was sworn in alongside Lisa Blunt Rochester, making the 119th United States Congress the first in which two Black women are serving in the U.S. Senate simutaneously.

In the spring of 2026, Alsobrooks taught a course on the importance of leadership at the University of Maryland, College Park.

In the 2026 Senate Democratic Caucus leadership election, Alsobrooks supported Senate minority leader Chuck Schumer over Maryland senator Chris Van Hollen, saying that she "supported Chris as a colleague and everything, but I am definitely a person of my word" and made a commitment to Schumer to support him in the leadership election following the 2026 United States Senate elections.

=== Committee assignments ===
- Committee on Banking, Housing, and Urban Affairs
  - Subcommittee on Financial Institutions and Consumer Protection
  - Subcommittee on Housing, Transportation, and Community Development
  - Subcommittee on National Security and International Trade and Finance
  - Subcommittee on Securities, Insurance, and Investment
- Committee on Environment and Public Works
  - Subcommittee on Transportation and Infrastructure (ranking member)
  - Subcommittee on Fisheries, Water, and Wildlife
- Committee on Health, Education, Labor and Pensions
  - Subcommittee on Education and the American Family
  - Subcommittee on Employment and Workplace Safety
- Special Committee on Aging

=== Caucus membership ===
- Congressional Black Caucus
- Congressional Caucus for Women's Issues

== Political positions ==
During her 2024 U.S. Senate campaign, The Baltimore Banner described Alsobrooks as center-left. She has cited Jack B. Johnson and Harris—whom she has also called her longtime friend—as her political mentors. Alsobrooks voted with President Donald Trump's stated position 6% of the time in the 119th Congress through 2025, according to a VoteHub analysis.

=== Crime and policing ===
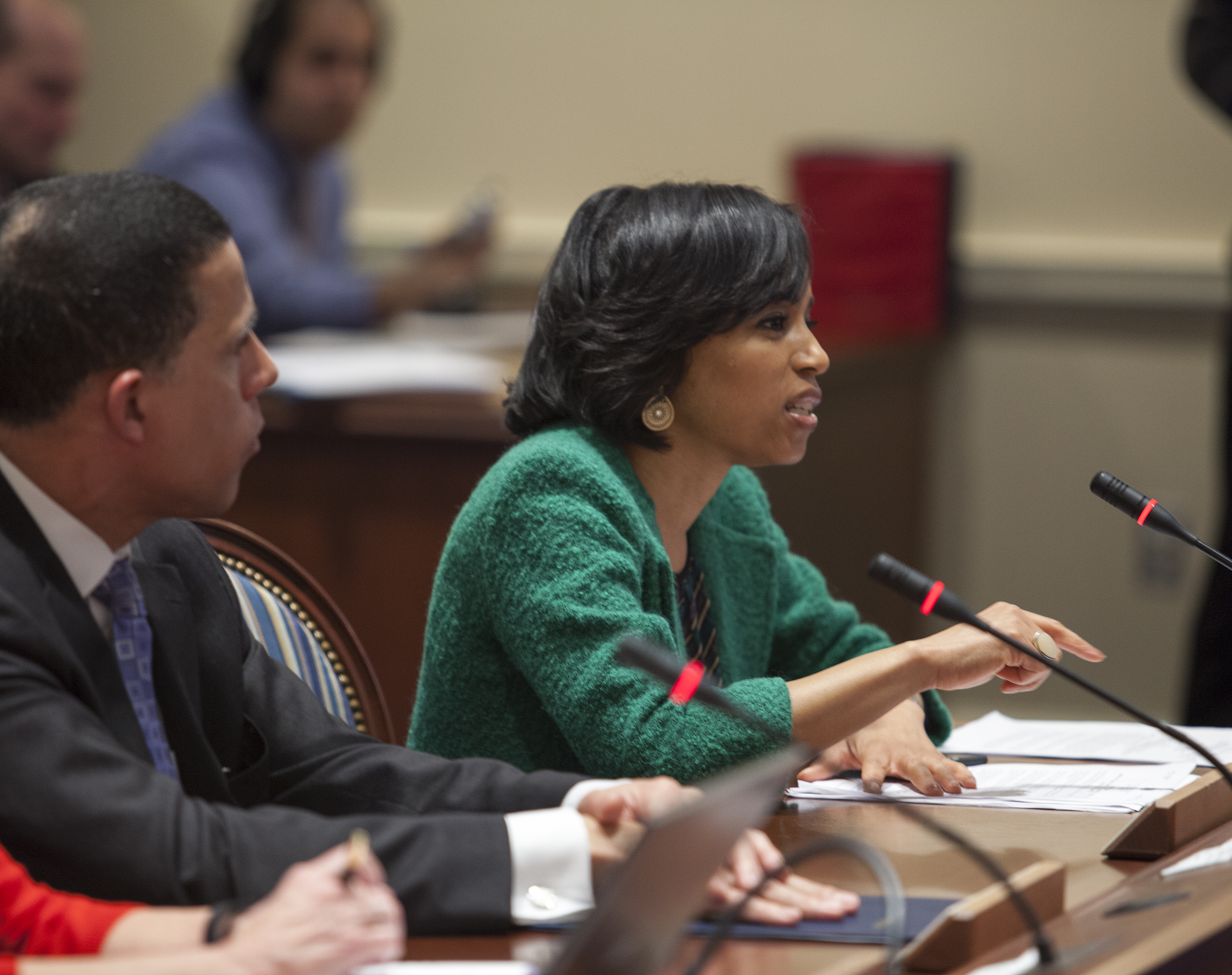
Alsobrooks testifies in support of legislation to protect domestic violence victims, 2014

As state's attorney, Alsobrooks opposed removing school resource officers from Prince George's County public schools. She also sought harsh sentences for juveniles who committed violent crimes and supported increasing minimum sentences for people convicted of illegal gun possession, but also supported programs to make it easier to get convictions expunged, divert juveniles from the criminal justice system, and help nonviolent drug offenders attend community college or vocational training. As county executive, Alsobrooks defended the Prince George's County Police Department from a racial discrimination lawsuit in which the county spent at least $17 million and settled for $5.8 million in July 2021.

In one of her first cases as state's attorney in February 2011, Alsobrooks sought the death penalty for Darrell Lynn Bellard, who had killed four people, including two children, in Prince George's County. After Governor Martin O'Malley signed a bill banning the death penalty into law in 2013, she withdrew her death penalty notice and instead sought a sentence of life without parole. Alsobrooks did not say whether she supported attempts to place a ballot initiative on the 2014 ballot to overturn the death penalty repeal, but said that she would consider seeking the death penalty if it were available. Bellard was convicted of four counts of first-degree murder and sentenced to four consecutive life sentences on June 27, 2014. In December 2023, Alsobrooks told MoCo360 that she did not support reinstating the death penalty and would support repealing it on the federal level if elected to the U.S. Senate.

In 2012, Alsobrooks said she opposed the Maryland Court of Appeals's ruling in Maryland v. King, which held that collecting cheek swabs from arrested individuals violates their Fourth Amendment rights. When asked by The Intercept if she still supported collecting DNA information from arrestees, a spokesperson for Alsobrooks said that collecting these records is a "valuable tool" in prosecuting violent criminals. During the 2023 legislative session, Alsobrooks testified against a bill that would increase privacy restrictions on police collection of biometric data.

During the 2013 legislative session, Alsobrooks testified for a bill to make mass violence threats a felony, which was introduced after threats were sent to Laurel High School and the University of Maryland, College Park, and another bill to require police and healthcare workers to report threats of abuse. She also supported a bill to increase sentences for crimes committed around minors.

In 2014, after the Maryland General Assembly voted to decriminalize the possession of small amounts of marijuana, Alsobrooks formed a committee to develop a plan on how to handle marijuana-related offenses. As state's attorney, she advocated for drug diversion programs that would provide treatment services to individuals charged with low-level marijuana offenses, including a program that allowed low-level drug offenders to attend Prince George's Community College and complete community service instead of serving prison sentences. In November 2015, Alsobrooks controversially claimed on WAMU's The Kojo Nnamdi Show that the decriminalization of marijuana resulted in a 30% increase in murders in Prince George's County. A spokesperson for Alsobrooks later said that her comments were "only theories that have not yet been proven by crime statistics". In February 2019, after her political committee conducted a poll asking voters about legalizing recreational marijuana for adults, Alsobrooks said on The Kojo Nnamdi Show that while she did not care how adults used marijuana, she had concerns with how its use could impact kids' development and their ability to get a job. During her 2024 U.S. Senate campaign, Alsobrooks said she would vote to legalize recreational marijuana on the federal level.

During the 2015 legislative session, Alsobrooks said she supported the Second Chance Act, which allowed for the expungement of certain nonviolent misdemeanor convictions, including disorderly conduct, trespassing, and theft of less than $1,000.

In November 2016, Alsobrooks spoke in support of a proposed rule prohibiting prosecutors from setting a high bail on poor defendants, arguing that the change would provide equal protection under the law for low-income individuals. In 2017, she opposed a bill that would set new standards for pretrial releases and increase the use of cash bail. During her 2018 county executive campaign, Alsobrooks said she supported abolishing cash bail.

During the 2018 legislative session, Alsobrooks testified in support of bills to make mandatory reporters liable for unreported child neglect, to make contract killing a felony, and to require domestic violence offenders to surrender their firearms.

Following the May 2020 murder of George Floyd, Alsobrooks announced in June that the county would forgo expanding its police training facility, instead funding a $20 million public health facility to treat mental health and addiction. She also condemned a video showing county police officers throwing down and kicking an individual at a Langley Park gas station as "disgusting" and said the officers involved should be fired, and called for reform of Maryland's Law Enforcement Officers' Bill of Rights. In July 2020, Alsobrooks established a Police Reform Task Force to come up with recommendations on public police reform. In February 2021, Alsobrooks announced that the county would implement the reforms recommended by the task force, including updates to the department's use of force policy and creating a new office of integrity led by an independent inspector general. During her 2024 U.S. Senate campaign, Alsobrooks supported the George Floyd Justice in Policing Act and called for reforms to the criminal justice system to promote safety, justice, and equity for residents.

In March 2022, after crime in Prince George's County had hit a 15-year high, Alsobrooks proposed a $57 million increase in police funding and created a task force to intervene in and prevent violent crimes among juveniles. In September 2022, she announced a 30-day juvenile curfew that charged violators with civil penalties and fines. While it was in effect, crime decreased five percent but overall increased two percent during all hours of the day. In October 2022, the curfew was extended until the end of 2022. Following a large teen brawl at National Harbor in April 2024, Alsobrooks declared a state of emergency and signed an executive order reinstating the youth curfew.

In June 2023, Alsobrooks issued her first-ever veto to an amendment to the county's $5.4 billion budget, which increased funding for the county's Emerging Adults Program, a program to reduce recidivism in young people, by $250,000. She said her decision to veto the youth program funding was "strictly a budget decision", explaining that she had to optimize spending while not raising taxes as the county dealt with a potential $60 million budget shortfall.

In August 2025, Alsobrooks criticized President Donald Trump's deployment of the National Guard to Washington, D.C., calling it "drastic executive overreach" and blaming congressional Republicans for a hiring freeze affecting the Metropolitan Police Department of the District of Columbia by cutting $1.1 billion in funding from the District's government.

=== Development initiatives ===
In November 2018, Alsobrooks said she would work with Hogan and the owners of the Washington Redskins to keep the football team in Prince George's County. In 2019, she stayed neutral on Hogan's proposal to take control of the federally controlled Oxon Cove Park and Oxon Hill Farm to build a new stadium for the Redskins, saying that while the Redskins were a valued enterprise, she was unwilling to take funds from higher priorities, such as education, public safety, health care, and economic development to keep the team from moving away. In 2021, Alsobrooks proposed developing a year-round sports and entertainment venue near FedExField as an incentive to keep the Washington Football Team in Maryland. During the 2022 legislative session, she supported a bill providing $400 million toward developing the entertainment venue, which Hogan signed into law in April 2022.

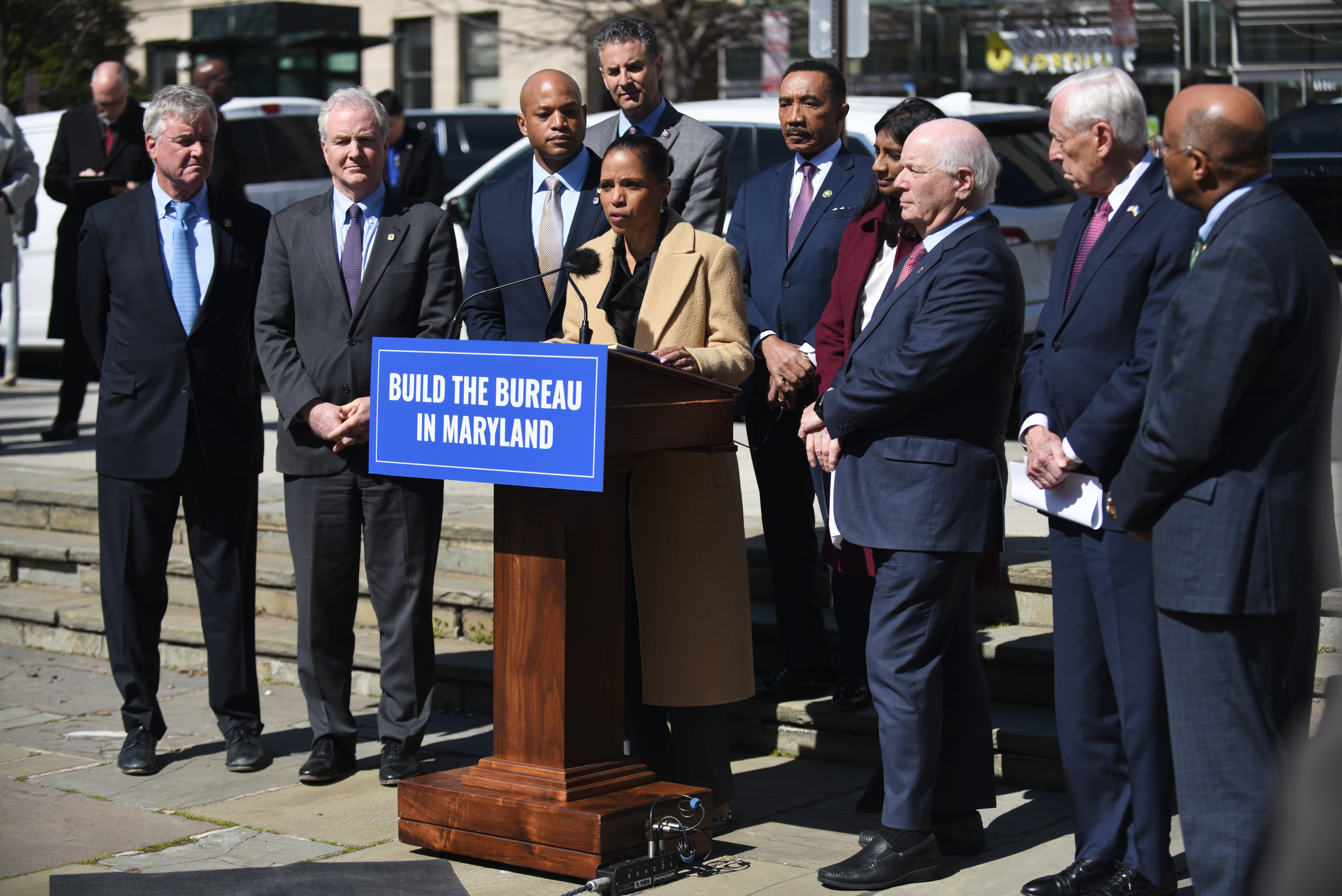
Alsobrooks speaks at a press conference to support building the new FBI Headquarters in Prince George's County, 2023.

Alsobrooks supports relocating the Federal Bureau of Investigation's headquarters to Prince George's County. In November 2022, she criticized General Services Administration criteria that she said "clearly favored Springfield, Virginia" over Prince George's County. In March 2023, Alsobrooks joined Democratic members of Maryland's congressional delegation and Governor Wes Moore in co-signing a letter to President Joe Biden asking him to get involved in the FBI's headquarters selection process. In November 2023, the General Services Administration announced that it would locate the FBI's new headquarters in Greenbelt, Maryland. But in March 2025, President Donald Trump blocked the move to Maryland, saying the agency should be in Washington, D.C., as opposed to "liberal" Maryland. In July 2025, after Trump said that he wanted the new FBI headquarters to be the Ronald Reagan Building and International Trade Center in Washington, D.C., Alsobrooks signed on to a letter saying that she and other Maryland lawmakers would "be fighting back against this proposal with every tool we have".

In February 2023, Alsobrooks signed into law a bill to temporarily cap rent increases at 3 percent. In April 2023, she expressed concerns with a bill to provide rental assistance to low-income residents, saying she wanted to wait for long-term recommendations from a housing work group. In October 2024, Alsobrooks praised the passage of a bill to cap rent increases at 6 percent per year or the consumer price index plus three percent, whichever is lower.

In June 2023, Alsobrooks said she opposed a bill to place a two-year moratorium on new townhouse developments in commercial areas and areas surrounding Metro stations, which she claimed would "discourage investment from businesses". In October 2023, she expressed concerns with a proposal to limit new building permits annually issued by the county until 2029.

In 2025, Alsobrooks supported the ROAD to Housing Act, a bipartisan housing reform package that aims to increase affordable housing nationwide. She co-led efforts to add the Community Investment and Prosperity Act, which allows banks to spend billions more than currently allowed on affordable housing and community development projects, to the bill.

=== Economic issues ===
In 2015, Alsobrooks supported a bill that required Prince George's County businesses to provide employees up to seven days of paid sick leave annually.

In 2019, Alsobrooks endorsed legislation in the Maryland General Assembly to raise the state's minimum wage to $15 an hour by 2023, saying "[n]o one jurisdiction can achieve this on its own, because unless each city and county adopts the $15 minimum wage, it will not be a viable solution". During her 2024 U.S. Senate campaign, she supported raising the federal minimum wage to $15 an hour and indexing future increases to inflation, as well as repealing the disability exemption from the Fair Labor Standards Act of 1938, which allows employers to pay employees with disabilities below the minimum wage.

During her 2024 U.S. Senate campaign, Alsobrooks opposed the Tax Cuts and Jobs Act. She supports raising the corporate tax rate, describing it as a matter of equity and fairness to middle class Americans, as well as expanding the child tax credit and capping childcare costs for low-income families.

In March 2024, Alsobrooks supported policies to "harness the benefits of cryptocurrency" to support underserved communities. During the 119th Congress, she co-sponsored the GENIUS Act, which would regulate stablecoins, but later told The American Prospect that she supported her Democratic colleagues' efforts to prevent the bill from advancing from committee without additional commitments. Alsobrooks was part of a bipartisan group of senators that negotiated a deal on the GENIUS Act to expand consumer protection safeguards and impose limits on tech companies issuing stablecoins, and was one of 18 Democrats to vote for the bill. In September 2025, Alsobrooks and eleven other Senate Democrats released a framework for legislation to regulate the issuance and trading of digital assets.

In May 2026, Alsobrooks and Thom Tillis reached a compromise to restrict stablecoin yield and rewards on the Digital Asset Market Clarity Act, which she voted to advance out of committee later that month. She was one of seven Democrats involved in negotiations over the bill, criticizing Republican revisions to the bill that she said "fell short" on issues such as ethics for elected officials, consumer protection, and market integrity. In September 2026, Alsobrooks voted against advancing the CLARITY Act on the Senate floor, telling reporters before the vote that Democrats still had issues with the bill's ethics language.

=== Education ===
During her county executive campaign, Alsobrooks said her administration would increase investment in pre-K education, career and technology education, and infrastructure improvement projects within the county's schools, with the goal of achieving universal pre-K for every child.

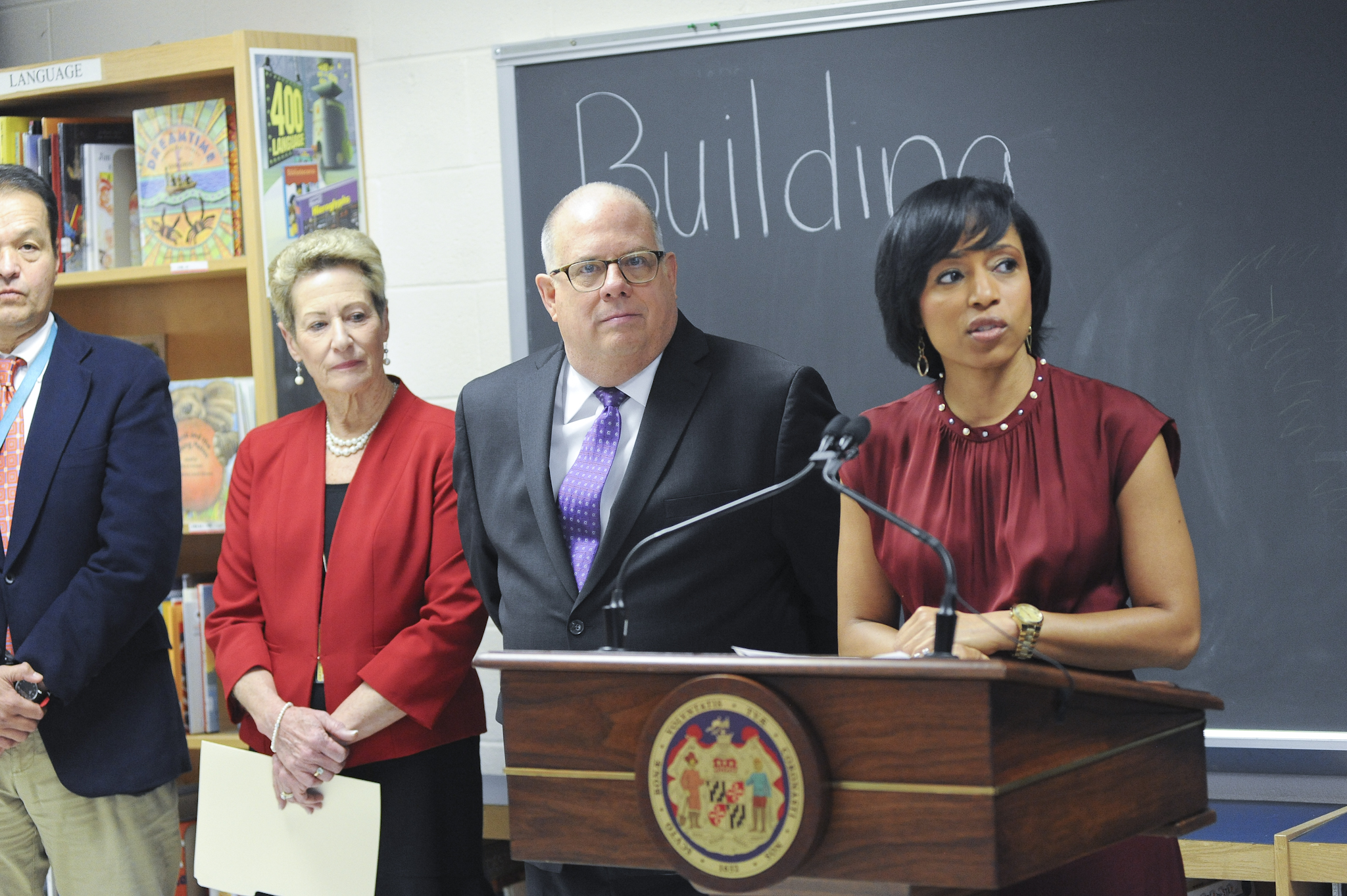
Alsobrooks speaks at a press conference announcing funds for school construction, 2018

In 2019, Alsobrooks announced that Prince George's County would use public-private partnerships to build and maintain several of the county's schools, making it the first jurisdiction in the United States to do so. According to The Baltimore Sun, six new schools have been built using these partnerships and eight more are currently being built as of September 2024. During the 2019 legislative session, she supported Hogan's proposal to fund school construction projects in the state with revenues from casino gaming. In 2020, Alsobrooks testified in favor of legislation that would allow the Maryland Stadium Authority to issue up to $2.2 billion in bonds to pay for school construction projects. During the 2024 legislative session, she supported a bill giving Prince George's County more discretion over county telecommunications and energy tax revenues, saying that the county needed "flexibility" to plan for the future. Currently, the money earned from these taxes goes toward funding the county's school system.

During the 2020 legislative session, Alsobrooks said that she supported the Blueprint for Maryland's Future, but expressed concerns with the education reform bill's funding requirements—which would have required Prince George's County to increase its education funding by $360 million by 2030—telling legislators that she would have to defund the county's police department to pay for the proposed education reforms. She also said she would not raise taxes to fund the Blueprint. In response, legislators amended the bill's funding formulas to lessen its impacts on poorer areas of the state, which decreased the bill's cost to Prince George's County to $183 million by 2030. In September 2021, Alsobrooks wrote to Hogan to express concern that none of the nominees to the state's education reform panel lived in Prince George's County. The panel refused requests to reopen applications, waiting for clarity from the Attorney General of Maryland. In September 2023, she said she would support giving counties increased oversight over education spending amid the Blueprint's implementation.

In January 2021, Alsobrooks appointed former state delegate Juanita Miller as chair of the Prince George's County Board of Education. After ethics charges were filed against almost all members of the Prince George's Board of Education in August 2021, Alsobrooks asked the state's top school officials to "immediately" investigate the allegations. The Maryland State Board of Education said it was unable to review the ethics allegations made against the school board members, saying that the report is confidential "until accepted by the local board of education". In June 2022, Alsobrooks asked Miller to resign from the school board after the Maryland State Board of Education made public two charges against her. Miller's term ended in the summer of 2024.

In February 2022, Alsobrooks asked the Maryland General Assembly to pass legislation to allow the Prince George's County school board to return to an all-elected school board, with nine members elected by district and one student member.

During her 2024 U.S. Senate campaign, Alsobrooks supported expanding the federal Pell Grant program and said she would work with the Biden administration to provide student loan relief. She also expressed support for increasing funding for Title I schools and the Individuals with Disabilities Education Act.

=== Electoral and ethical reform ===
In January 2020, Alsobrooks criticized a state law that prohibited Prince George's County politicians from taking contributions from developers with pending projects in the county, calling it "racially biased". Prince George's County was the only county in Maryland with a ban on developer contributions, passed in 2012 after Prince George's County Executive Jack B. Johnson pleaded guilty to accepting $1 million in bribes from real estate developers. She endorsed two bills to repeal the developer contributions ban partially, which became law later that year.

In July 2020, amid the COVID-19 pandemic, Alsobrooks sent a letter to Governor Larry Hogan asking him to provide multiple voting options for the 2020 general election, including mail-in voting and an expansion on in-person voting locations. The following day, Hogan ordered the Maryland State Board of Elections to hold full in-person elections for the general election and to send all registered voters an application for an absentee ballot. In response, she requested that the state elections board consolidate the county's 229 polling places into 15 vote centers, which Hogan criticized as a violation of the Voting Rights Act of 1965. Alsobrooks responded to this criticism by accusing him of mocking the county's residents for their concerns about the spread of COVID-19.

During the 2024 election, Alsobrooks indicated that she would support extending voting rights to undocumented immigrants and 16-year-olds. She also supported expanding the U.S. Supreme Court to thirteen members and imposing term limits on its justices. Alsobrooks supports eliminating the filibuster to pass the Freedom to Vote Act and the Women's Health Protection Act.

Alsobrooks criticized Republican mid-decade redistricting efforts in various red states, saying that the Republican Party was "trying to rig the rules in response to their terrible polling". In November 2025, Governor Wes Moore appointed Alsobrooks as the chair of a newly created commission on redistricting in Maryland. In January 2026, Alsobrooks voted to recommend a congressional redistricting map that would increase the Democratic Party's chances of winning Maryland's 1st congressional district, the only one represented by a Republican. In April 2026, Alsobrooks criticized the U.S. Supreme Court's ruling in Louisiana v. Callais.

=== Environment ===
As county executive, Alsobrooks established a county composting program for residents and spent over $1 billion on stormwater management programs. She also signed an executive order setting a goal for the county to halve its greenhouse gas emissions by 2030, compared with 2005, and to achieve net zero by 2045. During her 2024 U.S. Senate campaign, she praised the Inflation Reduction Act, promising to expand on its programs if elected, and supported initiatives to make electric vehicles more affordable, to increase federal funding for Chesapeake Bay pollution reduction programs, and to impose a carbon tax on the biggest carbon polluters to pay for climate change mitigation programs.

=== Foreign policy ===
Alsobrooks has cited preserving democracy as the most significant foreign policy issue facing the United States. She supports the expansion of NATO. Alsobrooks opposes sending U.S. troops to fight in the Russo-Ukrainian War or in a potential Chinese invasion of Taiwan.

Alsobrooks opposed tariffs the second Trump administration imposed on Canada and Mexico, saying that the uncertainty resulting from the tariffs threatened to upend the U.S. economy and lead to higher consumer prices. In March 2025, she introduced her first bill, the Tariff Transparency Act, which would require the U.S. International Trade Commission to study the tariffs' effects on consumers and businesses.

==== China ====
In 2025, Alsobrooks introduced a bill that would prohibit United States foreign adversaries from buying up the nation's farmland and timberland to spy on the U.S. and interrupt its food supply chains.

==== Iran ====
During her 2024 Senate campaign, Alsobrooks supported building on U.S. relations with Saudi Arabia, Jordan, and the United Arab Emirates to counter Iran. She also supports the Iran Nuclear Deal and other diplomatic efforts to prevent Iran from acquiring nuclear weapons, according to the American Jewish Congress.

After the June 2025 United States strikes on Iranian nuclear sites, Alsobrooks called them an unconstitutional usurpation of Congress's powers and something that would endanger U.S. service members and civilians. She also decried the possibility of another war in the Middle East and challenged President Trump to negotiate a diplomatic solution to end the Twelve-Day War. Alsobrooks voted for the Iran War Powers Resolution, which would have required congressional approval for another military strike against Iran. In February 2026, she criticized further U.S. and Israeli military strikes on Iran, citing Trump's campaign promises to end U.S. involvement in foreign wars and demanding that the U.S. Senate vote on a War Powers Resolution restricting the federal government's ability to continue strikes on Iran. Throughout the 2026 Iran war, Alsobrooks repeatedly voted for the Iran War Powers Resolution, which would remove U.S. troops from hostilities in Iran unless Congress approved the war.

==== Israel ====
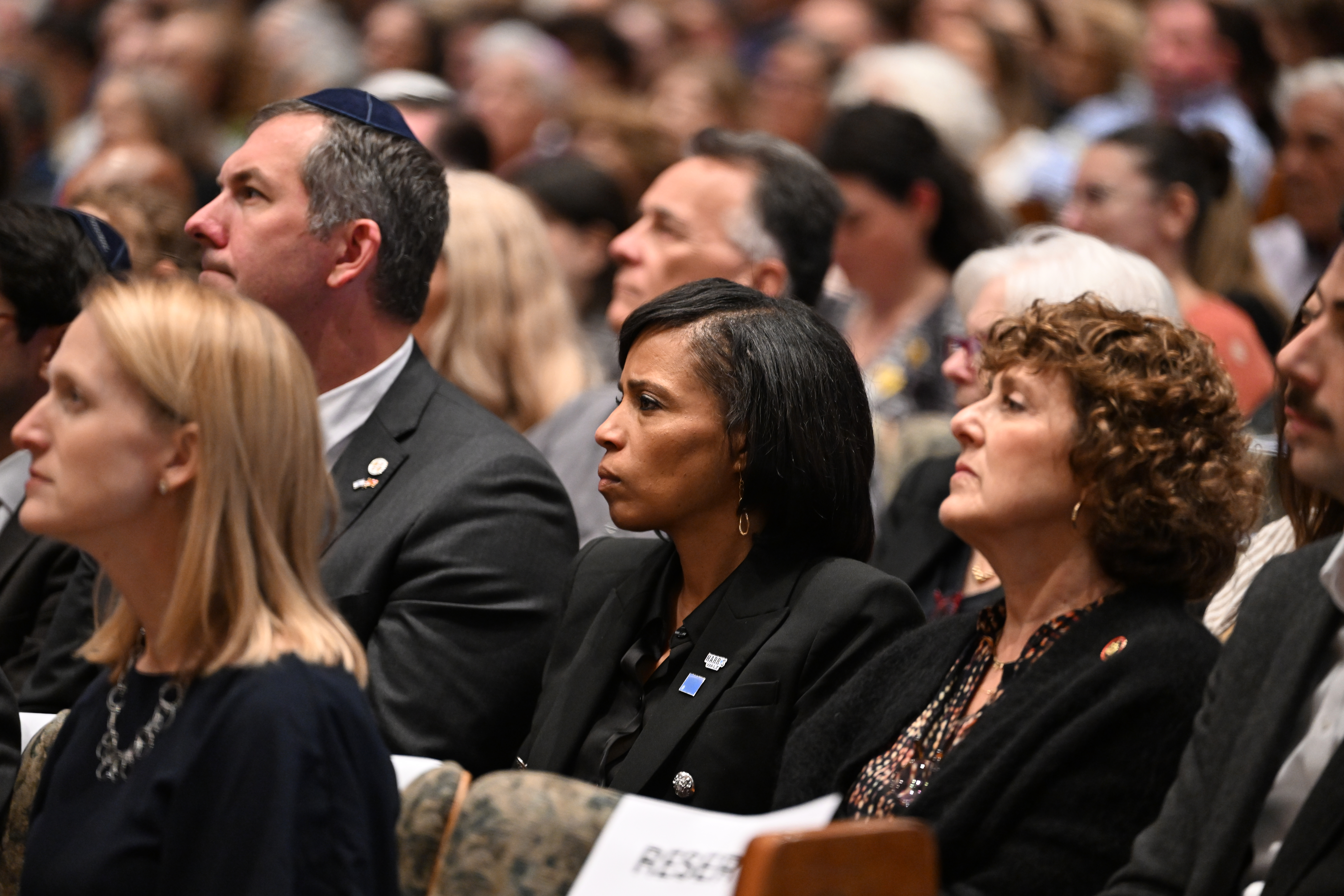
Alsobrooks attends services at Beth El Congregation on the anniversary of the October 7 attacks, 2024

Alsobrooks supports Israel's "right to defend itself" and has described herself as an ally toward maintaining Israel–United States relations, including supporting providing the country with funding and military assistance. She supports a two-state solution to the Israeli–Palestinian conflict. In 2019, Alsobrooks traveled to Israel with other local elected officials on an American Israel Education Foundation trip, during which she met with military officials and Knesset members, and visited the Golan Heights. According to the American Jewish Congress, she opposes the Boycott, Divestment and Sanctions (BDS) movement and supports the Antisemitism Awareness Act.

In October 2023, Alsobrooks expressed support for Israel in the Gaza war and spoke out against hate crimes against Jewish and Muslim people. She later expressed support for a ceasefire in the war alongside the release of hostages held by Hamas, and argued that the U.S. should withhold its offensive weaponry to Israel if it invaded Rafah. In April 2024, Alsobrooks distanced herself from U.S. senator Chris Van Hollen's calls to suspend U.S. arms transfers to Israel amid the war and said that opponents of Israel in the Democratic Party were "more interested in talking about problems than in fixing them". In July 2025, she voted for a resolution to block U.S. arms sales to Israel amid increasing warnings about the famine in Gaza. In December 2025, Alsobrooks said she supported the Gaza peace plan.

In September 2026, Alsobrooks signed on to a letter urging Israeli Prime Minister Benjamin Netanyahu to take immediate action against Israeli settler violence and stop allowing the construction of illegal settlements in the West Bank.

==== Ukraine ====
Alsobrooks supports Ukraine in the Russian invasion of Ukraine and during her Senate campaign said she would support legislation to provide foreign aid to Ukraine if elected, and expressed interest in allowing Ukraine to join NATO. She has called Russian President Vladimir Putin a dictator and a tyrant and expressed frustration with Republican efforts to hold up bills providing military assistance to Ukraine. In February 2025, Alsobrooks criticized President Donald Trump for blaming Ukraine for Russia's invasion and calling Ukrainian President Volodymyr Zelenskyy a dictator, calling it an "asinine statement that makes it clear this president is more interested in helping Putin than standing up for our allies".

==== Venezuela ====
In December 2025, Alsobrooks criticized U.S. military strikes on alleged drug traffickers in the Caribbean Sea, saying they represented a "dangerous abuse of power" because they were not authorized by Congress. In January 2026, she criticized U.S. military strikes in Venezuela, saying the strikes were likely illegal since Trump did not seek approval from Congress.

=== Gun control ===
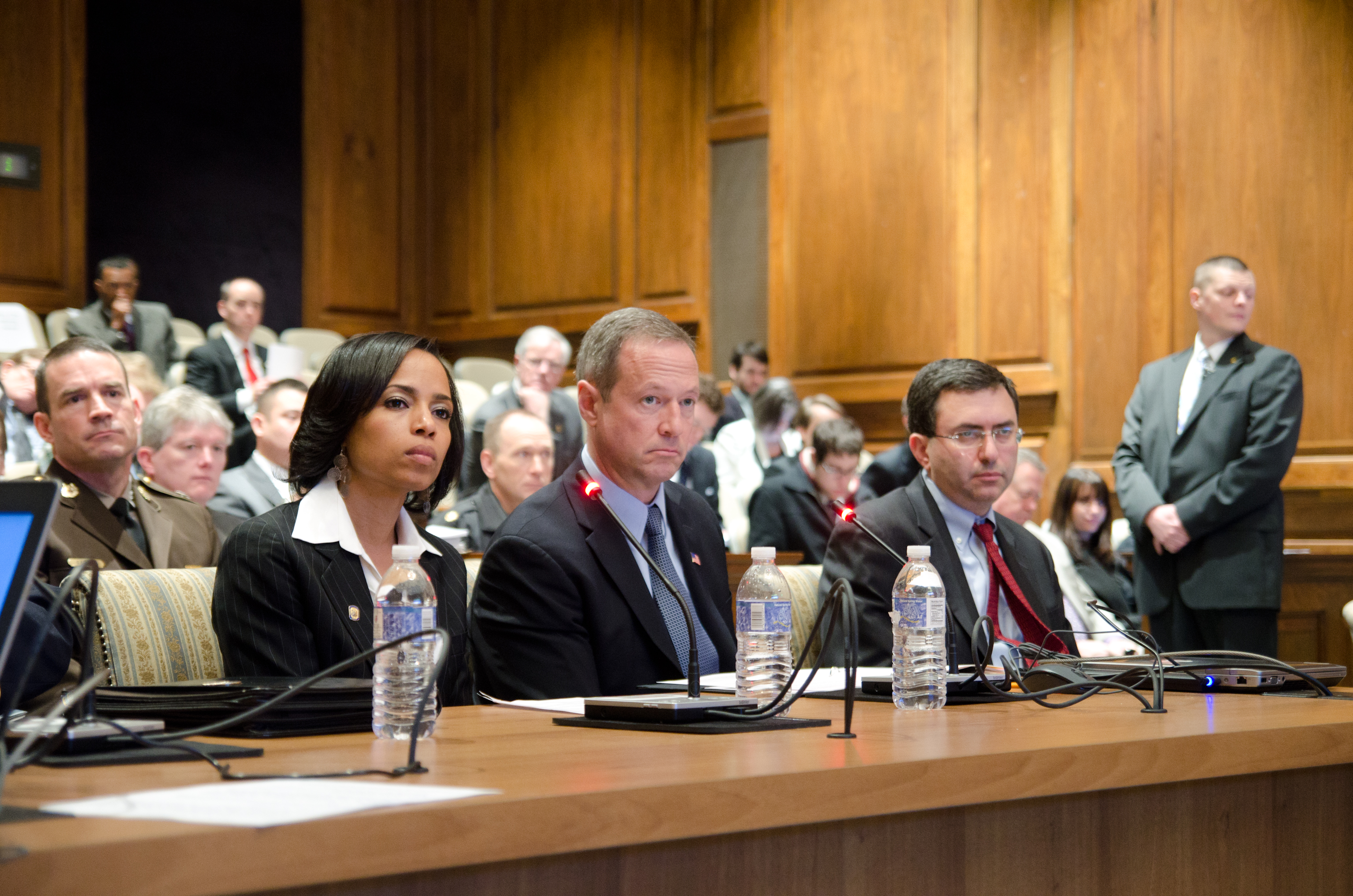
Alsobrooks testifies for the Firearm Safety Act with Governor Martin O'Malley, 2013

Alsobrooks testified in support of the Firearm Safety Act of 2013, a bill restricting firearm purchases and magazine capacity in semi-automatic rifles. During her 2024 U.S. Senate campaign, Alsobrooks blamed increases in gun violence on a lack of mental health resources and gun laws, and supported providing cities with access to federal data to enhance law enforcement's ability to trace guns. She also supports red flag laws and federal legislation to implement universal background checks for gun sales, combat gun trafficking, and ban assault weapons and homemade firearms.

=== Health care ===
In March 2019, Alsobrooks appeared in an ad to support legislation establishing the Prescription Drug Affordability Board, a body tasked with making recommendations to the Maryland General Assembly on how to make prescription drugs more affordable.

During her 2024 U.S. Senate campaign, Alsobrooks supported capping the price of insulin at $35, protecting Social Security, and expanding the Affordable Care Act and Medicaid to ensure universal health coverage. She also supported allowing Medicare to negotiate the prices of drugs and providing a public health insurance option through Medicare. Alsobrooks supported raising the cap on Social Security taxes and opposed proposals to raise the Social Security eligibility age. In May 2024, Alsobrooks signed onto a Maryland Healthcare for All pledge to support legislation to extend Inflation Reduction Act-provided healthcare benefits beyond 2025.

Since 2025, Alsobrooks has led opposition to Robert F. Kennedy Jr.'s tenure as Secretary of Health and Human Services and his Make America Healthy Again movement. During his confirmation hearing before the Senate Committee on Health, Education, Labor and Pensions, she decried his anti-vaccine advocacy and promotion of conspiracy theories, asking him "what different vaccine schedule would you say I should have received?" after he made false claims suggesting that Black people should receive vaccines on a different schedule than other people. Alsobrooks voted against his confirmation, after which she held "Sick Of It" rallies protesting his tenure and filed a resolution calling for his resignation. In subsequent committee hearings, she sparred with Kennedy over his firings of federal scientists and health workers, funding cuts to various divisions within the Department of Health and Human Services, and criticism of diversity, equity, and inclusion programs.

In July 2025, Alsobrooks voted against the One Big Beautiful Bill Act, criticizing provisions that would cut Medicaid and the Supplemental Nutrition Assistance Program (SNAP) through stricter eligibility requirements and saying they would pay for "tax breaks to his billionaire donors".

=== Immigration ===
In October 2012, Alsobrooks spoke in support of Question 4, a ballot referendum that sought to approve the Maryland's Dream Act, a bill extending in-state tuition to undocumented immigrants.

In February 2014, Alsobrooks spoke in support of a bill to limit the state's Secure Communities program by requiring Maryland jails to ignore U.S. Immigration and Customs Enforcement (ICE) requests to detain illegal immigrants for up to 48 hours. During her tenure as county executive, she declined to enter into an agreement with ICE, saying on her Senate campaign website in 2024 that she believed that "local law enforcement should not be involved in routine enforcement of a person's immigration status". In June 2019, Alsobrooks and other Democratic county executives released a joint statement condemning planned nationwide immigration enforcement raids and signed into law a bill prohibiting the Prince George's County Police Department from working with ICE in noncriminal deportation cases. In November 2019, she signed the Act Concerning Community Inclusiveness, a bill banning local agencies from cooperating with immigration enforcement.

During the 2024 election, Alsobrooks said she would support comprehensive immigration reform, including proposals to create a pathway to citizenship for undocumented immigrants and support Deferred Action for Childhood Arrivals and DREAM Act recipients. She supported the Bipartisan Border Security Bill negotiated by Senators James Lankford and Kyrsten Sinema and blamed former President Donald Trump for its failure to pass.

In March 2025, Alsobrooks's and Chris Van Hollen's staffers made an oversight visit to an ICE detention facility in Baltimore, after which the senators wrote to Homeland Security Secretary Kristi Noem and ICE director Todd Lyons raising concerns about conditions at the facility, including a lack of medical staff on site, overcrowding in holding rooms, and ICE staff "making sandwiches themselves or buying McDonald's" to feed detainees. The senators and other Democratic members of Maryland's congressional delegation made another oversight visit to the facility in July, during which an ICE official turned them away, even though they had given Noem and Lyons a week's notice of their intention to visit the facility. In January 2026, after footage from inside the Baltimore ICE detention facility went viral on social media, Alsobrooks said the video was further evidence that funding for ICE under Trump must be stopped. She later signed on to a letter to Noem and Lyons expressing concerns with conditions at the facility.

=== National politics ===
Alsobrooks opposed the 2018–2019 government shutdown, calling it "wicked" and President Donald Trump "ruthless". In January 2019, she announced a relief package for federal workers affected by the shutdown, which included funds for food and rent assistance, student financial aid, and utilities. In September 2025, ahead of the 2025 United States federal government shutdown, Alsobrooks introduced a bill that would allow essential federal employees to apply for unemployment benefits during a government shutdown. She later blamed Republicans for the shutdown, citing their control of the presidency and both chambers of Congress. In November 2025, Alsobrooks voted against a bill to end the government shutdown, saying that while she supported provisions to rehire federal employees who faced layoffs during the shutdown, she could not vote for a bill that did not extend Affordable Care Act subsidies.

Following the January 6 United States Capitol attack, Alsobrooks condemned the role of Trump and other lawmakers in inciting the attack. In October 2024, she blamed Trump for "a lot of" the antisemitism in the United States following the October 7 attacks, citing his comments following the Unite the Right rally. After the jury's guilty verdict in the Trump hush money trial, Alsobrooks expressed support for the U.S. justice system.

In February 2025, Alsobrooks opposed the U.S. federal deferred resignation program and the Trump administration's efforts to fire and reclassify thousands of federal workers at various agencies, noting that the layoffs would affect Maryland, which is home to about 160,000 federal workers. Alsobrooks voted for four of Trump's Cabinet nominees (John Ratcliffe, Sean Duffy, Doug Burgum, and Marco Rubio), but later pledged to vote against all of his remaining Cabinet-level nominees because of the effect on Maryland of "the witch hunt that this administration has put forward against these civil servants".

Alsobrooks supports statehood for Washington, D.C.

=== Social issues ===
Alsobrooks supported the Civil Marriage Protection Act, which legalized same-sex marriage in Maryland in 2012 and supported Question 6. During her tenure as county executive, Alsobrooks issued several proclamations recognizing Pride Month and expanded health services with people with HIV/AIDS, and hired the county's first government liaison to the LGBTQ community in June 2023. Later that month, she became the first county executive to fly the Progress Pride flag over county government buildings. During her 2024 U.S. Senate campaign, Alsobrooks supported the Equality Act and criticized anti-trans laws passed in Republican states as well as national efforts to "undermine equality and promote discrimination" against LGBT individuals.

Alsobrooks opposes restrictions on abortions, describing the decision to get an abortion as a "family decision for a woman, a family, and her doctor." In June 2022, she criticized the U.S. Supreme Court's decision in Dobbs v. Jackson Women's Health Organization, contrasting it with the court's earlier ruling in New York State Rifle & Pistol Association, Inc. v. Bruen. During her 2024 U.S. Senate campaign, Alsobrooks promised to immediately cosponsor the Women's Health Protection Act, which would overturn the Dobbs decision, said she would not support any judicial nominee who opposes abortion rights, and supported a 2024 referendum to codify the right to reproductive care into the Constitution of Maryland. She also criticized the Alabama Supreme Court's ruling in LePage v. Center for Reproductive Medicine, which held that frozen embryos had the same rights as children.

In February 2019, after it was reported that state delegate Mary Ann Lisanti had described a district in Prince George's County as a "n----- district" in a conversation with another legislator, Alsobrooks described her comments as "disturbing and offensive" and invited her to come to the county. She later called on Lisanti to resign from the Maryland House of Delegates.

In April 2023, Alsobrooks agreed with proposals to create a $2 million universal basic income pilot program in Prince George's County but expressed concerns with its funding due to its tight budget constraints. The $4 million pilot program, which was funded using a public-private partnership and provided $800 monthly payments to 125 seniors over a two-year span, was unanimously passed by the county council and launched in November.

In April 2024, Alsobrooks expressed concerns with proposals to ban TikTok in the United States.

In October 2024, Alsobrooks's campaign told The Baltimore Banner that she supported the Commission to Study and Develop Reparation Proposals for African-Americans Act, which would study proposals to provide African-Americans with reparations for U.S. slavery.

In September 2026, Alsobrooks opposed the Protect College Sports Act of 2026, criticizing provisions that imposed salary caps on college athletes that she said would "suppress the opportunities of the athletes".

=== Transportation ===
Alsobrooks opposed a proposal to build a maglev train connecting Washington, D.C., to Baltimore, describing the proposal as "outright disrespect to Prince George's County" and a "discourteous project". In May 2021, she sent a letter to acting Federal Railroad Administration Administrator Amit Bose and Maryland Transportation Secretary Greg Slater to voice her opposition to the D.C.–Baltimore maglev proposal, arguing that the construction would "tear through environmentally sensitive areas" and that the 311-mile-an-hour train would cause vibrations and hurt property values. In late 2021, Alsobrooks launched programs to preserve and construct mixed-use development around the Blue Line and Purple Line projects. In July 2023, Alsobrooks said she supported restarting the Red Line in Baltimore.

In February 2019, Alsobrooks introduced legislation to increase transparency on state road upkeep by publishing state schedules for upholding maintenance on state medians and litter pickup.

Following the Francis Scott Key Bridge collapse in March 2024, Alsobrooks supported the federal and state response to the disaster, as well as President Biden's pledge to cover 90 percent of the costs of replacing the bridge. During her 2024 U.S. Senate campaign, she criticized Hogan's cancellation of the Red Line in Baltimore and promised to support transit projects in the city, calling it the "foundation of economic opportunity".

== Personal life ==
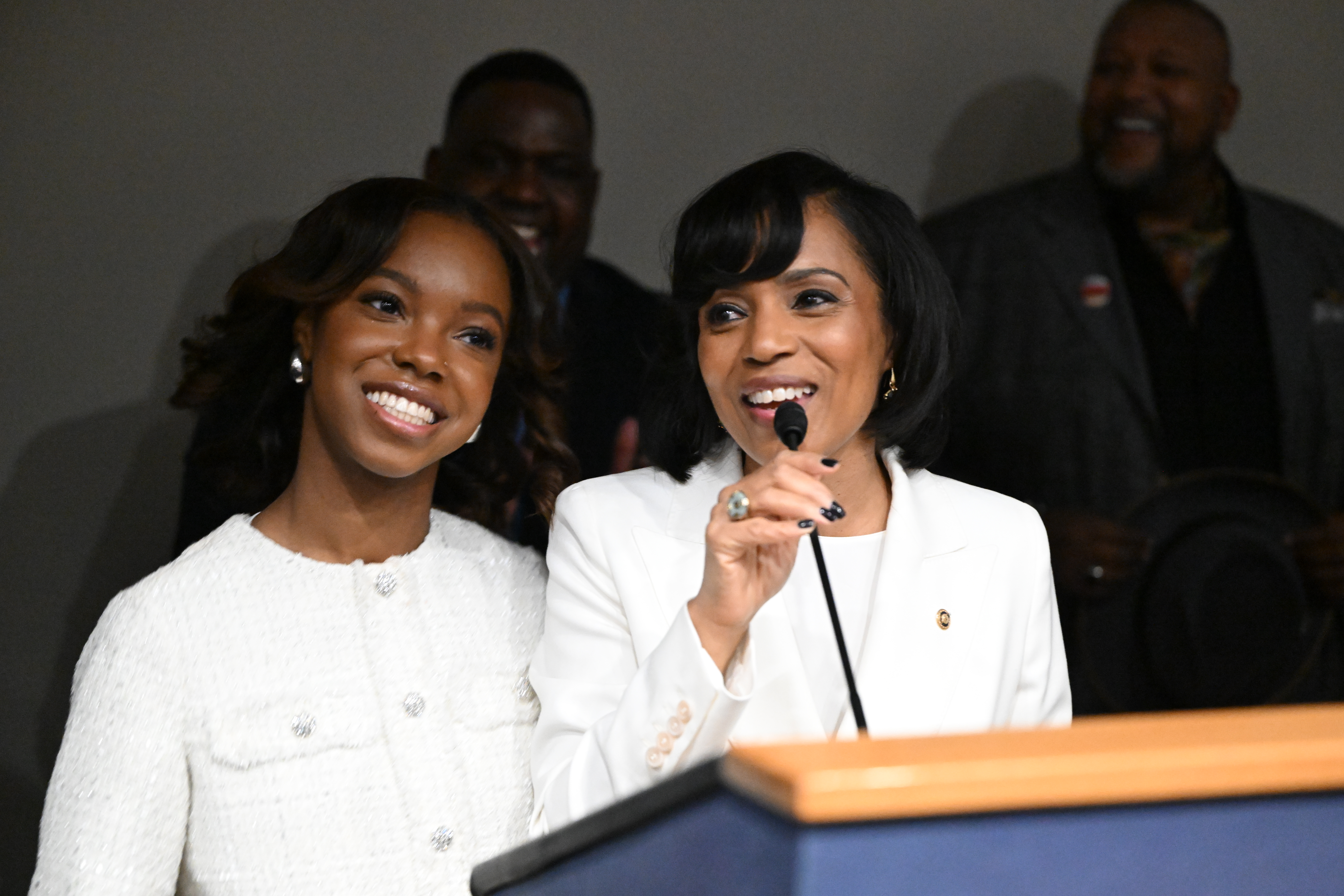
Alsobrooks and her daughter at her Senate Welcome Reception, 2025

Alsobrooks has a daughter, Alex, born in 2005, whom she raised as a single mother. She owns two homes in Prince George's County, including a townhouse in Upper Marlboro, and from 2005 to 2018 owned a home in northeast Washington, D.C. Her second cousin is Leslie Gray Streeter, a columnist for The Baltimore Banner.

Alsobrooks is a congregant at First Baptist Church of Glenarden. She is also a member of Delta Sigma Theta sorority and active in promoting breast cancer awareness. She is a fan of the Washington Commanders.

When she was eight years old, Alsobrooks was diagnosed with attention deficit hyperactivity disorder (ADHD), which led to her attending youth theater programs at Howard University. Her daughter also has ADHD.

In September 2024, CNN reported that Alsobrooks had improperly benefited from tax breaks she did not qualify for, including one meant for low-income senior citizens, allowing her to save nearly $14,000 in taxes on a property she owned in northeast Washington, D.C. between 2005 and 2017. She also saved at least $2,600 in taxes on a townhouse she owned in Prince George's County after applying for a homestead exemption in 2008. She later began to rent out the property while still taking the homestead exemption, violating state and local tax relief requirements. D.C. tax officials later determined that Alsobrooks owed the district $47,580 in property taxes. Alsobrooks's Senate campaign told CNN that she paid the mortgage of her grandmother's home in northeast Washington until it was sold in 2018 and was unaware of any tax credits attached to the property, and later told The Washington Post that she would pay back any taxes that should have been applied to the properties. The New York Times later obtained mortgage documents that show Alsobrooks attesting that she would live in the D.C. property for at least a year—she never did, instead using it as a rental property, making her ineligible for the homestead exemption she received. As of December 2024, Alsobrooks had paid the taxes she owed the District of Columbia.

== Electoral history ==
2010 Prince George's County State's Attorney election
Primary election
Party	Candidate	Votes	%
Democratic	Angela Alsobrooks	38,217	42.18
Democratic	Thomas E. Dernoga	19,186	21.18
Democratic	Peggy Magee	16,357	18.05
Democratic	Joseph L. Wright	8,422	9.30
Democratic	Mark Spencer	8,419	9.29
Total votes		90,601	100.00
General election
Democratic	Angela Alsobrooks	204,325	99.52
Write-in		983	0.48
Total votes		205,308	100.00
Democratic hold			

2014 Prince George's County State's Attorney election
Primary election
Party	Candidate	Votes	%
Democratic	Angela Alsobrooks (incumbent)	76,748	100.00
Total votes		76,748	100.00
General election
Democratic	Angela Alsobrooks (incumbent)	196,757	99.58
Write-in		827	0.42
Total votes		197,584	100.00
Democratic hold			

2018 Prince George's County Executive election
Primary election
Party	Candidate	Votes	%
Democratic	Angela Alsobrooks	80,784	61.79
Democratic	Donna F. Edwards	31,781	24.31
Democratic	C. Anthony Muse	13,127	10.04
Democratic	Paul Monteiro	2,748	2.10
Democratic	Michael E. Kennedy	728	0.56
Democratic	Tommie Thompson	510	0.39
Democratic	Lewis S. Johnson	416	0.32
Democratic	Billy Bridges	340	0.26
Democratic	Samuel Bogley	308	0.24
Total votes		130,742	100.00
General election
Democratic	Angela Alsobrooks	294,372	98.94
Write-in		3,159	1.06
Total votes		297,531	100.00
Democratic hold			

2022 Prince George's County Executive election
Primary election
Party	Candidate	Votes	%
Democratic	Angela Alsobrooks (incumbent)	115,473	90.93
Democratic	Moisette Tonya Sweat	3,979	3.13
Democratic	Leigh Bodden	2,865	2.26
Democratic	Sherman R. Hardy	2,767	2.18
Democratic	Billy W. Bridges	1,909	1.50
Total votes		126,993	100.00
General election
Democratic	Angela Alsobrooks (incumbent)	219,453	98.65
Write-in		3,000	1.35
Total votes		222,453	100.00
Democratic hold			

2024 United States Senate election in Maryland
Primary election
Party	Candidate	Votes	%
Democratic	Angela Alsobrooks	357,052	53.37
Democratic	David Trone	286,381	42.80
Democratic	Joseph Perez	4,688	0.70
Democratic	Michael Cobb	4,524	0.68
Democratic	Brian Frydenborg	3,635	0.54
Democratic	Scottie Griffin	3,579	0.53
Democratic	Marcellus Crews	3,379	0.51
Democratic	Andrew Wildman	2,198	0.33
Democratic	Robert Houton	1,946	0.29
Democratic	Steve Seuferer	1,664	0.25
Total votes		669,046	100.00
General election
Democratic	Angela Alsobrooks	1,650,912	54.64
Republican	Larry Hogan	1,294,344	42.84
Libertarian	Mike Scott	69,396	2.30
Write-in		6,726	0.22
Total votes		3,021,378	100.00
Democratic hold			

== See also ==
- List of African-American United States senators
- Women in the United States Senate
- List of African-American United States Senate candidates
- List of new members of the 119th United States Congress

== Notes ==
Legal offices
Preceded by Glenn Ivey	State's Attorney of Prince George's County; 2010–2018	Succeeded by Aisha Braveboy
Political offices
Preceded by Rushern Baker	Executive of Prince George's County; 2018–2024	Succeeded by Tara Jackson; Acting
Party political offices
Preceded by Ben Cardin	Democratic nominee for U.S. Senator from Maryland (Class 1); 2024	Most recent
Preceded by Stacey Abrams, Raumesh Akbari, Colin Allred, Brendan Boyle, Yvanna Cancela, Kathleen Clyde, Nikki Fried, Robert Garcia, Malcolm Kenyatta, Marlon Kimpson, Conor Lamb, Mari Manoogian, Victoria Neave, Jonathan Nez, Sam Park, Denny Ruprecht, Randall Woodfin	Keynote Speaker of the Democratic National Convention; 2024	Most recent
U.S. Senate
Preceded by Ben Cardin	U.S. Senator (Class 1) from Maryland; 2025–present Served alongside: Chris Van Hollen	Incumbent
U.S. order of precedence (ceremonial)
Preceded by Dave McCormick	Order of precedence of the United States as United States Senator	Succeeded by Bernie Moreno
Preceded by Bernie Moreno	United States senators by seniority 94th	Succeeded by Tim Sheehy
