= Judge Hazel =

Judge Hazel may refer to:

- George J. Hazel (born 1975), judge of the United States District Court for the District of Maryland
- John R. Hazel (1860–1951), judge of the United States District Court for the Western District of New York
