= Department of Commerce v. New York =

- Supreme Court of the United States

Argued April 23, 2019 Decided June 27, 2019
- Full case name: Department of Commerce, et al. v. New York, et al.
- Docket no.: 18-966
- Citations: 588 U.S. 752 (more) 139 S. Ct. 2551; 204 L. Ed. 2d 978
- Decision: Opinion

Case history
- Prior: New York v. Dept. of Commerce, No. 1:18-cv-02921, 351 F. Supp. 3d 502 (S.D.N.Y. 2019); cert. granted, 139 S. Ct. 953 (2019).

Holding
- The Secretary of Commerce did not violate either the Enumeration Clause under the Constitution of the United States or the Census Act of 1790 by opting to reinstate a question on a person's status of citizenship to the 2020 census questionnaire, but the United States District Court for the Southern District of New York was warranted to remand the case from the judiciary to the bureaucratic agency where the evidence does not tell the same story as that of the Secretary of Commerce. Questioning the status of one's citizenship in the federal census is a reviewable action under the Administrative Procedures Act.

Court membership
- Chief Justice John Roberts Associate Justices Clarence Thomas · Ruth Bader Ginsburg; Stephen Breyer · Samuel Alito; Sonia Sotomayor · Elena Kagan; Neil Gorsuch · Brett Kavanaugh

Case opinions
- Majority: Roberts, joined by unanimous (Parts I and II); Thomas, Alito, Gorsuch, Kavanaugh (Parts III, IV–B, and IV–C); Thomas, Ginsburg, Breyer, Sotomayor, Kagan, Kavanaugh (Part IV–A); Ginsburg, Breyer, Sotomayor, Kagan (Part V)
- Concur/dissent: Thomas, joined by Gorsuch, Kavanaugh
- Concur/dissent: Breyer, joined by Ginsburg, Sotomayor, Kagan
- Concur/dissent: Alito

Laws applied
- U.S. Const. Art. I, §2, cl. 3; Amdt. 14, §2 Administrative Procedure Act

Department of Commerce v. New York, No. 18–966, 588 U.S. 752 (2019), was a case decided by the Supreme Court of the United States dealing with the 2020 United States census. The case concerned the decision of the United States Census Bureau under the Trump administration to include a question asking whether respondents are United States citizens or not, on the standard census questionnaire sent to all households. That question had been purposely omitted from this "short form" since the 1950 census because officials and sociologists thought it would reduce participation in the census. It has been used on the "long form" American Community Survey sent to a subset of households and used for statistical estimation.

The Supreme Court case was a culmination of three separate cases decided between September 2018 and March 2019, with the earliest being heard under New York District Court Judge Jesse M. Furman. While the Census Bureau stated that the question was requested by the Justice Department to assist in enforcing the Voting Rights Act of 1965, lower courts have found that explanation to be pretense. Additionally, many state and city officials have raised concerns that inclusion of the question would significantly depress response rates, which in turn would reduce the quality of census data, which is used, in part, to draw redistricting maps, which influence the results of future elections. Due to the urgency of printing the census forms, the government expedited the case to the Supreme Court.

On June 27, 2019, the Court decided that the Enumeration clause allows for a citizenship question to be added. However, it also stated that such additions can be reviewed by courts under the Administrative Procedure Act, and judged that the administration's explanation for adding the question "appears to have been contrived" and was pretextual. Unable to meet certain legal deadlines when the case was remanded to the District Court, the Trump administration announced it would instead issue an Executive Order to collect existing data from the Department of Commerce to tally immigration numbers. Furman issued a final order in July 2019 barring the administration from adding the question to the 2020 census or delaying the census any further.

== Background ==
The United States Census Bureau, which operates out of the United States Department of Commerce, conducts a nationwide census every decade to determine the population and its distribution within the United States, as required by Article I of the Constitution. The population numbers are used to distribute the number of members of the United States House of Representatives, as well as internally by each state to draw up their congressional and legislative redistricting maps.

Between 1790 and 1950, census instructions required every member of a household to be counted, regardless of citizenship. The census also typically included a question asking for each person's citizenship status. Starting in 1940, the Census Bureau began evaluating methods of using reduced sample sizes to obtain additional information, and by the 1960 census, had moved several questions to a separate "questionnaire form" that was sent to a small sample of households to reduce the burden of the main "long form". The citizenship question was one of those moved. The questionnaire form evolved into the American Community Survey, introduced in 2005.

=== 2020 census ===
Wilbur Ross, the United States Secretary of Commerce within the Trump administration following the 2016 presidential election, stated that the Bureau intended to add the question related to citizenship back to the "short form" sent to all households for the 2020 United States census. Ross cited the need to add the question to prevent voter discrimination under the Voting Rights Act of 1965 as determined by the Commerce Department, and he approved the addition of the question.

Ross' decision was shortly met with criticism from state and local governments. These officials feared that the citizenship question would scare away up to 6.5 million people from completing the census, particularly in geographic locations with large numbers of immigrants (legal or otherwise). Research suggests that the addition of a citizenship question to the census will likely lead to greater non-responses and incomplete responses from Hispanics and immigrants who fear the information from the census, which is intended to be kept private by the Census Bureau, may be used by law enforcement officials to arrest and deport undocumented immigrants and potentially even legal ones. Separate analyses, made from a combination of surveys and Census Bureau estimates over the past few years, show that the addition of the citizenship question is likely to lead to an undercount of approximately 5.8-5.9% of Hispanics and undocumented immigrants. An upper end estimate puts the undercount at 10% of households with undocumented immigrants. If the census undercounted these areas, the states' representation in the federal government may be reduced, with upwards of eight states losing or gaining one or more seats by these analyses. The undercounting would further influence the required redistricting based on the census prior to upcoming elections. This also would impact federal funding that is driven by census data, estimated to be about US$80 billion for schools, infrastructure, and other services.

=== District Court proceedings ===
A lawsuit led by the state of New York's Barbara Underwood with the support of 16 other states, 15 cities, and other civil advocacy groups was filed in the United States District Court for the Southern District of New York. During the discovery phase, it was discovered that Ross' reasons to add the question may not have come from the Justice Department but from discussions with Steve Bannon, President Trump's chief strategist during the first seven months of his presidency, along with Kris Kobach, a Kansas Republican known for strong anti-immigration views. The states argued that if this was the true basis for the question, rather than from a Commerce department decision, it would make the addition of the question unconstitutional.

This led to Judge Jesse M. Furman of the district court to request the government set aside time for Ross for a deposition in September 2018, prior to the planned start of the trial in November 2018. The government opposed this action via a writ of mandamus to the United States Supreme Court, stating that requiring Ross to depose before the trial was not proper procedure, while also seeking to delay the trial. The Supreme Court refused to allow a delay, but did agree that Ross should not be deposed until after the trial's start. They also agreed to hear oral arguments related to early deposition, but not on the citizen question, with oral hearings for Department of Commerce v. U.S. District Court for the Southern District of New York (Docket 18-557) planned on February 19, 2019.

Judge Furman ruled on the citizenship question on January 15, 2019, finding that "the decision to add a citizenship question to the 2020 census – even if it did not violate the Constitution itself – was unlawful for a multitude of independent reasons and must be set aside." Furman vacated Ross's decision and enjoined the Census Bureau from adding a citizenship question on the 2020 census. A few days later, the Supreme Court stated they would no longer hear the oral arguments related to the deposition issue, but did not rule out reviewing the case at a later time.

== Supreme Court ==
On January 25, 2019, the government petitioned the Supreme Court for a writ of certiorari before judgment, bypassing the normal appeal process through the Second Circuit Court of Appeals, as the deadline for printing the 2020 census forms was June 2019, also the end of the Supreme Court term. The government asked two questions in its petition, the first again asking about the deposition of a government official before the start of a trial, and the second to review Judge Furman's decision. The Supreme Court agreed to hear the case on February 15, 2019, fast-tracking it to hold oral arguments in April 2019 allowing them to rule on the matters by the end of term. February 22, 2019, the court set the case for oral argument April 23, 2019 at 10 a.m.

Concurrent to New York's challenge, a separate case related to the census question was brought by the state of California and several local and city governments against Ross and the Commerce Department, challenging the question's addition as a violation of the Enumeration Clause of Article I of the Constitution. The case was heard by Judge Richard Seeborg at the United States District Court for the Northern District of California. In early March 2019, Seeborg ruled in favor of the state and local governments, agreeing that the question's addition would be unconstitutional. On March 15, 2019, the Supreme Court ordered both sides in the New York case to prepare to discuss the potential constitutionality of the question in light of Seeborg's decision. Yet another separate case related to the census citizenship question was decided by Judge George J. Hazel in the United States District Court for the District of Maryland a few weeks before the Supreme Court's oral hearings. Hazel also found cause for the citizenship question to be unconstitutional given the political climate surrounding immigration, and questions the process that was claimed for how Ross came to add the question. However, this decision was not considered by the Supreme Court due to the late stage in the process.

=== Oral argument ===
Audio of oral argument

During oral arguments, observers to the court felt that the decision would fall along ideological lines favoring retaining the citizenship question. While the court's more liberal justices followed Justice Sonia Sotomayor in fearing the question would suppress responses and thus impact the final numbers, the conservative members including Justices Neil Gorsuch and Brett Kavanaugh felt the question asked was fair, had been on the questionnaire for the majority of the census's history, and was similar to questions asked by other countries during their census-taking. The conservative Justices also believed that laws relating to the content of the census were deferent to the decisions made by the Secretary of Commerce, so Ross was in his authority to add the question regardless of its origins.

=== Hofeller documents ===
In late May 2019, following oral arguments but before the Court gave its decisions, The New York Times published documents recovered from a hard drive owned by Thomas B. Hofeller, a political strategist for the Republican party who died in August 2018. The documents indicated that Hofeller may have had a significant role in framing the need for the citizenship question, driven by the Republican goal of partisan gerrymandering to assure long-term control of Congress and state legislative bodies. The American Civil Liberties Union filed a motion in light of this evidence, asserting that assistants to Ross obfuscated Hofeller's role in how the question was added. At the time of this case, the Supreme Court had dealt with the question of partisan gerrymandering in the previous and sitting terms. Alongside this action, the New York Immigration Coalition sought injunctions in Furman's District Court over these findings within the week of their discovery; Furman delayed his decision pending the ruling of the Supreme Court.

=== Decision ===
The Court issued its decision on June 27, 2019, affirming and reversing the District Court's decision in parts. The majority decision was written by Chief Justice John Roberts, with the other justices split among concurring and dissenting in part. The majority decision upheld that the Enumeration Clause allows a citizenship question in the census but stated that the decision to add this question is a reviewable action under the Administrative Procedure Act (APA). The Supreme Court also agreed that the explanation provided by the Commerce Department for the question was insufficient. Roberts wrote that under the APA, they were expecting that Commerce would "offer genuine justifications for important decisions, reasons that can be scrutinized by courts and the interested public", and that the reason provided by Commerce "appears to have been contrived" and was pretextual. Roberts was joined by the four liberal Justices, Ginsburg, Kagan, Breyer, and Sotomayor, in affirming the District Court's injunction against adding the question until Commerce is able to provide a satisfactory explanation.

== Subsequent actions ==
The decision left the matter of whether the citizenship question would be included on the 2020 census unresolved. Whether it would ultimately be included depended on if the Department of Commerce could present a "non-pretextual" rationale for the question's inclusion to the District Court before the printing deadline. On July 2, 2019, the Trump administration stated that it will go ahead and print the census forms without the citizenship question. However, the next day, President Trump countered this, stating that the administration was still exploring options to include the question, which was later confirmed by the Justice Department. Under demand of Judge Hazel from the Maryland District Court, the Department affirmed July 5 that it still intended to add the question, requesting Judges Hazel and Furman to begin scheduling of discovery hearings to the two District cases, with Hazel refusing to delay this phase further at the Department's request. On July 7 the DOJ announced that it was replacing its entire legal team dealing with that question, but on July 9 Furman rejected the DOJ action, saying that reasons must be given for the withdrawal of each attorney, and pointing out that the administration had been insisting for months that the question needed to be settled by July 1.

On failure to replace the legal team, Trump announced on July 11, 2019, he had instructed the DOJ to no longer seek action on the census question, and instead issued Executive Order 13880 to request that the Department of Commerce provide the administration with all the data it had on citizenship and immigration status. Furman issued his order on July 16, 2019, that permanently barred the government from including the immigration question on the 2020 census or to further delay preparations for the census. Further, Furman's order stated the court would retain jurisdiction on the matter until the conclusion of the census, on December 31, 2020, when the results are to be delivered to the President.

Plaintiffs in the District Court case continued to seek motions for sanctions on the Trump administration for providing false or misleading statements during the case. Their claims were further backed by emails and additional evidence released in November 2019 by the House Committee on Oversight and Reform, who had concurrently been investigating the census question's addition since 2018. The new emails showed stronger evidence that Hofeller had worked closely with Mark Neuman, the administration's former adviser on the census, for the immigration questions than previously established.

== See also ==
- Trump v. New York (2020)
- Immigration policy of Donald Trump
