= Leslie Johnson (councilwoman) =

American politician

Leslie E. Johnson

Prince George's County Council, District 6
- In office December 6, 2010 – 2011
- Preceded by: Samuel H. Dean
- Constituency: Prince George's County

Personal details
- Born: Nashville, Tennessee, U.S.
- Party: Democratic
- Spouse: Jack B. Johnson
- Profession: Attorney

Leslie Ellen Johnson is a former council member of Prince George's County, Maryland who represented the county's sixth district. She is the wife of former county executive Jack B. Johnson.

== Career ==
On November 12, 2010, FBI agents arrested both her and her husband. She was sworn in on December 6, 2010, amidst opposition from five of the nine council members. Leslie Johnson had been scheduled to plead guilty to federal charges on May 3, 2011, but the hearing was abruptly canceled. On May 17, 2011, Jack Johnson pleaded guilty to extortion and witness- and evidence-tampering.

Leslie Johnson pleaded guilty to federal corruption charges on June 30, 2011. Maryland state law requires that Johnson, as a convicted felon, resign once she is sentenced. Johnson had indicated that she planned to remain in office until her sentencing date in October 2011, by which time she stood to collect nearly $28,000 in additional salary. However, on July 5, Johnson announced her resignation, effective July 31. Johnson would continue to draw her salary until the end of the month. The county council called for Johnson to step down immediately, and voted to divest Johnson of her council staff along with her county-issued car and cellular phone. On December 9, 2011, Johnson was sentenced to one year and one day in prison. She began serving her sentence in March 2012 at Alderson Federal Prison Camp, and was released after ten months for good behavior.

Preceded by Samuel H. Dean	District 6 member for Prince George's County, Maryland County Council; 2010–present	Succeeded by Derrick Leon Davis
