= Alexander Williams Jr. =

American judge

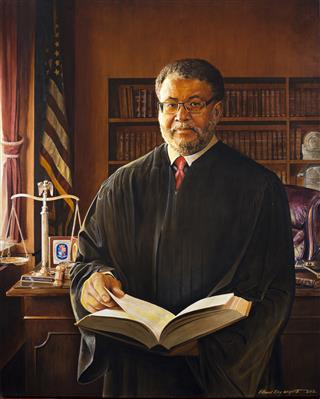

Senior Judge of the United States District Court for the District of Maryland
- In office May 8, 2013 – January 3, 2014

Judge of the United States District Court for the District of Maryland
- In office August 18, 1994 – May 8, 2013
- Appointed by: Bill Clinton
- Preceded by: Norman Park Ramsey
- Succeeded by: George J. Hazel

State's Attorney of Prince George's County
- In office 1987–1994
- Preceded by: Arthur A. Marshall, Jr.
- Succeeded by: Jack B. Johnson

Personal details
- Born: May 8, 1948 (age 78) Washington, D.C., U.S.
- Education: Howard University (BA, JD)

Alexander Williams Jr. (born May 8, 1948) is a former United States district judge of the United States District Court for the District of Maryland.

== Education and career ==
Born in Washington, D.C., Williams received a Bachelor of Arts degree from Howard University in 1970 and a Juris Doctor from Howard University School of Law in 1973. He was a law clerk for Judge James H. Taylor, Seventh Judicial Circuit of Maryland from 1973 to 1974. He was in private practice in Hyattsville, Maryland and Beltsville, Maryland from 1974 to 1986, serving as a municipal attorney for Fairmount Heights from 1975 to 1987, and as a substitute juvenile master, Prince George's County Circuit Court (part-time) from 1976 to 1977. He was an Assistant public defender, Prince George's County Public Defender's Office from 1977 to 1978. He was a Special counsel and hearing examiner, Prince George's County Board of Education (part-time) from 1978 to 1987. He became a professor of law at Howard University from 1978 to 1989, continuing as an adjunct professor thereafter. He was a Municipal attorney of Glenarden from 1980 to 1987, and was then a State's attorney of Prince George's County from 1987 to 1994. Alexander Williams Jr. was the first African American elected to the office of State's Attorney in Prince George's County, Maryland.

== Federal judicial service ==
On August 6, 1993, President Bill Clinton nominated Williams to a seat on the United States District Court for the District of Maryland vacated by Judge Norman P. Ramsey. A substantial majority of the American Bar Association Standing Committee on the Federal Judiciary deemed Williams not qualified, alleging he had inflated his trial experience which they viewed as insufficient and criticizing his legal writing, though members of both parties on the Judiciary Committee questioned their assessment.

Williams was confirmed by the United States Senate on August 17, 1994, and received his commission on August 18, 1994. He took senior status on May 8, 2013. He retired from active service on January 3, 2014.

== See also ==
- List of African-American federal judges
- List of African-American jurists

== Sources ==
Legal offices
Preceded by Arthur "Bud" Marshall	State's Attorney for Prince George's County, Maryland; 1987–1994	Succeeded by Jack B. Johnson
Preceded by Norman Park Ramsey	Judge of the United States District Court for the District of Maryland; 1994–2013	Succeeded by George J. Hazel
