= Norman Park Ramsey =

American judge

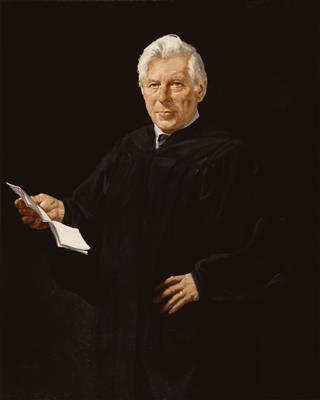

Senior Judge of the United States District Court for the District of Maryland
- In office November 1, 1991 – September 30, 1992

Judge of the United States District Court for the District of Maryland
- In office September 30, 1980 – November 1, 1991
- Appointed by: Jimmy Carter
- Preceded by: Charles Stanley Blair
- Succeeded by: Alexander Williams Jr.

Personal details
- Born: Norman Park Ramsey; September 1, 1922 Fairchance, Pennsylvania
- Died: June 15, 1993 (aged 70) Baltimore, Maryland
- Education: University of Maryland School of Law (LLB)

Norman Park Ramsey (September 1, 1922 – June 15, 1993) was a United States district judge of the United States District Court for the District of Maryland.

== Education and career ==
Born in Fairchance, Pennsylvania, Ramsey served in the United States Marine Corps during World War II, from 1943 to 1946, achieving the rank of First Lieutenant. He received a Bachelor of Laws from the University of Maryland School of Law in 1947. He was a law clerk for Judge William Calvin Chesnut of the United States District Court for the District of Maryland from 1946 to 1947. He was an Assistant United States Attorney of the District of Maryland from 1947 to 1950, entering private practice in Baltimore, Maryland from 1950 to 1955, and then serving as a deputy state attorney general of Maryland from 1955 to 1957. He returned to private practice in Baltimore from 1957 to 1980.

== Federal judicial service ==
On July 25, 1980, Ramsey was nominated by President Jimmy Carter to a seat on the United States District Court for the District of Maryland vacated by Judge Charles Stanley Blair. Ramsey was confirmed by the United States Senate on September 29, 1980, and received his commission on September 30, 1980. He assumed senior status on November 1, 1991, serving in that capacity until his retirement, on September 30, 1992. He then returned to private practice, until his death on June 15, 1993, in Baltimore.

== Sources ==
Legal offices
Preceded by Charles Stanley Blair	Judge of the United States District Court for the District of Maryland; 1971–1980	Succeeded by Alexander Williams Jr.
