= Thomas Hofeller =

American political strategist (1943–2018)

- Born: April 14, 1943; San Diego, California, U.S.
- Died: August 16, 2018 (aged 75); Raleigh, North Carolina, U.S.
- Education: Claremont McKenna College (B.A.); Claremont Graduate University (Ph.D)
- Occupation: Political strategist

Thomas Brooks Hofeller (April 14, 1943 – August 16, 2018) was a Republican political strategist primarily known for his involvement in gerrymandering electoral district maps favorable for Republicans. David Daley of The New Yorker referred to Hofeller as "the master of the modern gerrymander." According to The New York Times, Hofeller's "mastery of redistricting strategy helped propel the Republican Party from underdog to the dominant force in state legislatures and the United States House of Representatives."

== Early life and education ==
Hofeller was born April 14, 1943, in San Diego, California. He served in the United States Navy during the Vietnam War.

He majored in political science at Claremont McKenna College and earned a Ph.D. in government at The Claremont Graduate School (now Claremont Graduate University).

== Career ==
In the early 1970s, Hofeller developed a "computerized mapping system" for the California State Assembly. In the 1980s, he was behind a strategy to increase Republican power in the South by using the 1965 Voting Rights Act to create more majority-black districts and thus pack African-Americans into fewer districts and make it easier for Republican candidates to win the remaining white districts. According to The New York Times, Hofeller's views on skewed maps appeared to be motivated by a desire to strengthen Republican power; during the 1980s, Hofeller opposed Democratic maps that were skewed in favor of Democrats, but later became an advocate for similar maps skewed to favor Republicans.

Hofeller played a key part in gerrymandering notoriously lopsided maps, such as those in North Carolina (turning a 7-to-6 seat Democratic edge in the House to a 10-to-3 Republican edge) and Pennsylvania. He once said, "Redistricting is like an election in reverse. It's a great event. Usually the voters get to pick the politicians. In redistricting, the politicians get to pick the voters." Hofeller normally hid his tracks and advised his clients to do the same, warning them, "Don’t reveal more than necessary," and, "Emails are the tool of the devil." In 2017, as he was deposed under oath in a federal lawsuit challenging gerrymandered North Carolina congressional district maps, he was asked about directives Republicans had given him. "There were no instructions given to you in writing?" "There’s no paper trail against which we can evaluate your description of the instructions?" "No," he responded to both questions while denying he recalled cautioning the operatives against giving him written instructions.

From June 2009 to August 2018, Hofeller earned just over $2 million from the Republican National Committee. From January 2017 to July 2018, he was paid $422,000.

== After death ==
=== 2020 census citizenship question ===
After his death, Hofeller's daughter, Stephanie Hofeller, made available computer hard drives that had been in her father's possession. Files on the hard drives showed that he played a key part in the decision of the Trump administration to add a citizenship question to the 2020 census, a decision that was challenged in the federal courts in the case Department of Commerce v. New York. Hofeller had conducted a study in 2015 which found that adding such a question would make it possible to draw district boundaries that "would be advantageous to Republicans and non-Hispanic whites." Hofeller himself wrote the portion of the Department of Justice letter used to justify why the Trump administration had made this decision. The letter claimed that adding the citizenship question was necessary to enforce the 1965 Voting Rights Act. The New York Times described the files as "the most explicit evidence to date that the Trump administration added the question to the 2020 United States Census to advance Republican Party interests."

In May 2019, the plaintiffs suing over the 2020 United States Census citizenship question cited the 2015 Hofeller analysis and other documents in a motion for sanctions, saying "many striking similarities" existed between the unpublished Hofeller analysis and the United States Department of Commerce's decision to seek a citizenship question on the Census. The federal government, in response, said that the Hofeller study "played no role in the department's December 2017 request" for a citizenship question on the Census. In June 2019, the United States Court of Appeals for the Fourth Circuit, citing the Hofeller document, remanded the case to the U.S. district court to determine whether the Trump administration's stated rationale for adding a citizenship question to the 2020 census was in fact a pretext for a discriminatory purpose (the dilution of voting power of Hispanic voters in order to advantage Republicans and non-Hispanic whites).

On July 5, 2019, Judge George J. Hazel of the United States District Court for the District of Maryland, which is part of the Fourth Circuit Court of Appeals, approved the commencement of discovery into the Hofeller files.

=== North Carolina ===
The New Yorker was the first media outlet to obtain at least seventy thousand files and several years of emails that were saved by Hofeller. David Daley wrote that the files "...mostly pertain to Hofeller’s work in North Carolina, where he drew—and defended in court—the state’s legislative and congressional maps multiple times, after judges ruled them to be either unconstitutionally partisan or racial gerrymanders." On Sept. 3, 2019, in the case of Common Cause v. Lewis, a North Carolina court struck down the state's legislative maps as a partisan gerrymander in violation of the state constitution. Mark Joseph Stern wrote in Slate, "The court had unprecedented access to the gerrymandering process thanks to the Hofeller files..." The court cited from Hofeller's files that "metadata on maps of state legislative districts showed they were almost completely drawn months before Republican legislative leaders publicly adopted the standards for drawing them." The three-judge panel also cited his files "in concluding that he had used racial statistics to shape his maps despite public claims to the contrary." Jowei Chen, a professor of Political Science at the University of Michigan, had testified in July 2019 that he had found that Hofeller had manually entered "%18_ap_blk" into nearly every draft of his mapping software when he mapped North Carolina's districts. The formula "%18_ap_blk" shows the number of African American citizens of voting age in each district.

In November 2019, a court ruled that Hofeller's files were no longer considered confidential as they address political activities in other states, affecting redistricting and the national census, and could be used in other suspected cases of gerrymandering. The files covered Hofeller's work on political maps in Arizona, Florida, Maryland, Mississippi, Missouri, Ohio, Tennessee and Virginia, along with Nassau County in New York and Galveston and Nueces Counties in Texas.

=== Publication ===
Hofeller's daughter, Stephanie, several weeks after announcing her intentions on Twitter, published copies of her father's files on January 5, 2020.

Encouraging others to mirror the files and to create and seed torrents as quickly as possible, Stephanie was able to keep her shared Google Drive available for just over a week before overwhelming traffic brought down the drive. Nevertheless, the plan to distribute the files was successful.

== Personal life ==
Hofeller was married to Kathleen Hofeller. They had a daughter, Stephanie. Hofeller died in 2018 in his Raleigh, North Carolina home at the age of 75.
