= Maryland Office of the Public Defender =

Public defense organization in Maryland

The headquarters of the Maryland Office of the Public Defender is located in the William Donald Schaefer Tower; Suite 1400, 6 St. Paul Street, Baltimore, MD 21202. Natasha Dartigue is the Public Defender.

== Historic legislation of the Maryland Office of the Public Defender ==
On March 4, 1971, Maryland Senate President William James introduced Senate Bill 454 to the 1971 session of the Maryland General Assembly. Senate Bill 454 was:

^{AN ACT to add a new Article 27A to the Annotated Code of Maryland (1971 Replacement Volume), to follow immediately after Article 27 thereof, and to be under a new title "Public Defender, "to provide for and authorize the creation of a Public Defender System for the State of Maryland so as to assure effective assistance and continuity of counsel and related services to indigent accused persons taken into custody and to indigent defendants in criminal, juvenile, appellate, post conviction and other proceedings instituted before the Courts of the State of Maryland; and relating generally to the public defender system and to its workings and operations and the duties of certain persons in relation thereto.}

On April 3, 1971, Senate Bill 454 received a 33–3 vote by the Maryland Senate, and on April 10, 1971, it received a 78–39 vote by the Maryland House of Delegates. On April 28, 1971, Governor Marvin Mandel approved Senate Bill 454. Subsequently, Section 3 of Article 27A took effect in the Annotated Code of Maryland on July 1, 1971, and the remainder of Article 27A went into effect on January 1, 1972.

== Section 3 of Article 27A ==
Section 3 of Article 27A went into effect as the first stage of law concerning the Office of the Public Defender for Maryland. It decreed that the Office of the Public Defender is part of Maryland’s Executive Branch of government, and provided that a Public Defender shall be appointed head of the Office by the Board of Trustees. Furthermore, it stated that the public defender shall seek the approval of the board of trustees per the appointment of a deputy director, and likewise with the appointment of district public defenders for each of the twelve districts. Section 3 follows that the Public Defender shall seek the advice of district public defenders in the course of appointing assistant public defenders for a respective district.

Pursuant Section 3 of Article 27, to be qualified as Public Defender, a person must be an attorney-at-law, having been admitted to practice law in the State of Maryland by the Court of Appeals of Maryland, by which he or she has been engaged in the practice of law for at least five years prior to appointment. A person seeking appointment to deputy public defender must satisfy the same criteria. Assistant public defenders are qualified for appointment after establishment that he or she is an attorney-at-law as confirmed by admittance to practice law in the State of Maryland by the Court of Appeals of Maryland.

The remainder of Section 3, Article 27A pertains to the Public Defender’s use of the budget in that it shall provide suitable offices within the state with at least one office in each district, and that all employees including personnel such as investigators, stenographers, clerical assistants and other staff shall be provided a salary appropriated by the executive budget for the Office of the Public Defender.

== Repeal of Article 27A ==
At the time when Article 27A was enacted, it followed immediately after Article 27 of the Annotated Code, which is titled: “Crimes and Punishments”. On the first day of the 2008 Regular Session of the Maryland General Assembly (January 9, 2008 to April 7, 2008), Senate Bill 37 was introduced and subsequently on April 8, 2008, Article 27A (sections 1-14) was repealed in entirety and underwent a code revision as “Chapter 15, Acts of 2008, Criminal Procedure Article, Title 16. Office of the Public Defender”, which is codified in the most current version (red books) of the Maryland Annotated Code. The 2008 code revision of Article 27A was a milestone in a forty-year effort to revise the Maryland Annotated Code. “Chapter 15, Acts of 2008, Criminal Procedure Article, Title 16. Office of the Public Defender” was part of the revision process that won't end until every articles in the black books (cited by an article and section number) undergo a transition to the new red books (cited by article name and number) of the Maryland Annotated Code.

== Chapters 223 & 224, Acts of 2010; Code Criminal Procedure Article, Title 16 (sections 16-101 through 16-213) ==
The purpose of Senate Bill 97, which was introduced in the 2010 Maryland General Assembly Session (January 13, 2010 – April 12, 2010), was to implement substantive changes to Chapter 15, Acts of 2008, Criminal Procedure Article, Title 16 (2008 code revision).

Senate Bill 97 was signed by Governor Martin O’Malley on May 4, 2010 (as chapter 223) and became effective on June 1, 2010. It affected sections 16-203 “Office Personnel” and 16-301 “Board of Trustees". House Bill 122 was identical to Senate Bill 97, and it was signed (as chapter 224) and went into effect on the same days as Senate Bill 97. The third substantive change to Chapter 15, Acts of 2008, Criminal Procedure Article, Title 16 began with House Bill 121 which was signed on May 1, 2010 (as chapter 393) and went into effect June 1, 2010. It affected section 16-210 “Eligibility for Service”.

== Funding ==
The Maryland Office of the Public Defender (OPD) is an independent agency of the Executive Branch of Maryland. In 2017, the OPD’s fiscal allowance was $104.2 million.

== Public Defender ==
Pursuant Title 16-207 Duties and Powers of Public Defender, the general duties of the Public Defender are to

1. be responsible for the operation of the all district offices;
2. prepare schedule of fees and expenses for panel attorneys and other professional and technical services rendered to indigent individuals
3. consult and cooperate with professional groups about the causes of criminal conduct; and
4. maintain financial and statistical records about each case in which the Office provides legal assistance to an indigent individual.

The general powers of the Public Defender are to (1) adopt regulations to carry out the purpose of Title 16; (2) make necessary arrangements to coordinate services of the Office with any federal program to provide an attorney to indigent individuals; (3) arrange for the Office to receive money or services available to assist in the duties under Title 16; and (4) accept the services of volunteer workers or consultants at no compensation for their necessary expenses or otherwise. The Public Defender is appointed by the Board of Trustees to a six-year term. Eligibility requirements have not changed from Article 27A.

== Other providers of representation of indigent individuals ==
Pursuant Title 16-204, other than the public Defender, the deputy public defender, district public defenders, assistant public defenders and panel attorneys can provide representation to indigent individuals in accordance with the Office of the Public Defender.

== Indigent individuals ==
The OPD renders legal services to eligible indigent individuals charged with violating State, county, and/or municipal laws involving possible incarceration. According to Title 16-210, an individual is considered indigent only after being determined so by the following:

(a) Application as indigent individual. -- An individual may apply for services of the Office as an indigent individual, if the individual states in writing under oath or affirmation that the individual, without undue financial hardship, cannot provide the full payment of an attorney and all other necessary expenses of representation in proceedings listed under 16-204(b).

(b) Determination of eligibility—Individuals with assets and income less than 100 percent of federal poverty guidelines. -- For an individual whose assets and net annual income are less than 100 percent of the federal poverty guidelines, eligibility for services of the Office may be determined without an assessment regarding the need of the applicant.

(c) Determination of eligibility—Individuals with assets and income equal to or exceeding 100 percent of federal poverty guidelines.

== Representation of indigent individual ==
Title 16-204 of the Maryland Annotated Code states that the proceedings for which an indigent individual shall receive representation are:

- in a criminal or juvenile proceeding in which a defendant or party is alleged to have committed a serious offense;
- in a criminal or juvenile proceeding in which an attorney is constitutionally required to be present prior to presentment being made before a commissioner or judge;
- in a postconviction proceeding for which the defendant has a right to an attorney under Title 7 of this article;
- in any other proceeding in which confinement under a judicial commitment of an individual in a public or private institution may result;
- in a proceeding involving children in need of assistance under § 3-813 of the Courts Article; or
- in a family law proceeding under Title 5, Subtitle 3, Part II or Part III of the Family Law Article, including for a parent, a hearing in connection with guardianship or adoption; a hearing under § 5-326 of the Family Law Article for which the parent has not waived the right to notice; and an appeal.

It is not a constitutional right that an indigent individual have the right to counsel at the initial appearance before a District Court Commissioner. See Senate Bill 1114, Senate Bill 973, House Bill 1186, which all failed to be passed at the 2014 session of the Maryland General Assembly.

== Districts ==
The OPD is divided into twelve district offices throughout the state of Maryland. Each district of the OPD has jurisdiction within each geographical district of the District Court of Maryland. The OPD operates offices located in

District 1: Baltimore City;

District 2: Dorchester, Somerset, Wicomico, and Worcester Counties;

District 3: Caroline, Cecil, Kent, Queen Anne’s, and Talbot Counties;

District 4: Charles, Calvert, and St. Mary’s Counties;

District 5: Prince George’s County;

District 6: Montgomery County;

District 7: Anne Arundel County;

District 8: Baltimore County;

District 9: Harford County;

District 10: Howard and Carroll Counties;

District 11: Frederick and Washington Counties

District 12: Alleghany and Garrett Counties.

== Divisions ==
=== Statewide Division: Appellate ===
The Appellate Division of the OPD employs 26 lawyers who represent OPD clients in direct appeals in the Court of Special Appeals of Maryland and the United States Supreme Court – upon the granting of further review in a lower court.

=== Statewide Division: Collateral Review ===
Lawyers who are within the OPD Collateral Review Division represent OPD clients in state post conviction hearings, coram nobis, state habeas corpus, motions to reopen, parole revocation, and extradition hearings.

=== Statewide Division: Parental Defense ===
Staff or panel attorneys within the Parental Defense Division represent parents/legal guardians in court proceedings when their children have been removed or are at risk of being removed by the State (local department of social services) due to allegations of abuse and/or neglect.

=== Litigation Support Unit: Aggravated Homicide ===
The lawyers within The Aggravated Homicide Division represent OPD clients, on a statewide level, facing capital prosecution. The Aggravated Homicide Division also provides training to assistant public defenders in the following areas: “complex homicide litigation, including pretrial motions practice, identification of mental health and sentencing issues, and trial preparation”

=== Litigation Support Unit: Forensics ===
The Forensics Division of the OPD trains and provides technical and litigation support to OPD attorneys in order to:

- Formalize collaborative relations with Districts/Divisions to increase the utilization of forensic experts and to ascertain forensics needs specific to the individual Districts/Divisions
- Develop experts in all present and emerging forensic fields
- Provide individualized and specialized training in the respective Districts/Divisions
- Provide trial support in cases with forensic evidence
- Draft and litigate comprehensive forensic discovery motions
- Litigation by the Division of unique or groundbreaking litigation
- Development and maintenance of a forensic expert transcript databank.

=== Litigation Support Unit: Mental Health ===
Lawyers within the OPD Mental Health Division represent individuals who have been “involuntarily confined to public or private mental health facilities”.

=== Litigation Support Unit: Juvenile Protection ===
The three attorneys, one social worker, and one paralegal within the Juvenile protection unit “work collaboratively with the trial attorneys who represent the individual juveniles ensuring that the commitment orders for those clients are fully complied with and ensuring the health and safety of the juveniles while detained”.

=== Litigation Support Unit: Social Work ===
The Social Work Division consists of three positions: Director of Social Work, Supervisor of Juvenile Services Division, and Social Work Supervisor. This division handles the social and mental aspects involved with crime committed by OPD clients.
