= George J. Hazel =

American lawyer and former judge (born 1975)

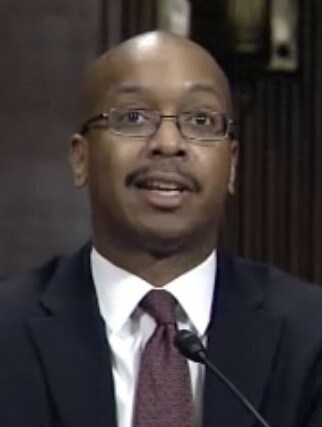
- Hazel in 2013

Judge of the United States District Court for the District of Maryland
- In office May 2, 2014 – February 24, 2023
- Appointed by: Barack Obama
- Preceded by: Alexander Williams Jr.
- Succeeded by: Brendan Hurson

Personal details
- Born: George Jarrod Hazel; March 19, 1975 (age 51) New York City, U.S.
- Education: Morehouse College (BA); Georgetown University (JD)

George Jarrod Hazel (born March 19, 1975) is an American lawyer who is a former United States district judge of the United States District Court for the District of Maryland. He previously served as the chief deputy state's attorney for Baltimore, Maryland.

== Early life and education ==
Born in New York City, Hazel received a Bachelor of Arts cum laude, from Morehouse College in 1996. He received a Juris Doctor from the Georgetown University Law Center in 1999.

== Career ==
He began his legal career as an associate at the law firm of Weil, Gotshal & Manges LLP, in Washington, D.C., from 1999 to 2004. He served as an Assistant United States Attorney in the District of Columbia, from 2005 to 2008 and in the U.S. Attorney's Office of Maryland, from 2008 to 2010. From 2011 until his confirmation as a federal judge in 2014, he served as chief deputy state's attorney for Baltimore.

=== Federal judicial service ===
On September 25, 2013, President Barack Obama nominated Hazel to serve as a United States district judge of the United States District Court for the District of Maryland, to the seat vacated by Judge Alexander Williams Jr., who assumed senior status on May 8, 2013. On January 16, 2014, his nomination was reported out of committee. On May 1, 2014, the Senate invoked cloture on Hazel’s nomination by a 55–42 vote. Later that same day, Hazel was confirmed by a 95–0 vote. He received his judicial commission on May 2, 2014. Upon his swearing in, Hazel was told he was the youngest United States district judge. On December 7, 2022, Judge Hazel announced his intention to resign as a United States District Judge, effective February 24, 2023, and to return to private practice. He resigned from the bench on February 24, 2023. He is now a partner at Gibson, Dunn & Crutcher LLP.

=== Notable rulings ===
- In April 2019, Hazel ruled against Maryland plaintiffs in a case challenging the Commerce Department's intent to include a question about citizenship on census forms. With two other judges, he had found that the Trump administration had violated administrative law with its intent to add the question to 2020 United States Census. However in formulating that decision, Hazel did not find sufficient evidence to support claims that the government had intentionally moved to include the question specifically in order to discriminate against immigrants and non-white minorities by its inclusion, nor did he agree that evidence before the court proved that it was an element of a conspiracy violate the constitutional rights of noncitizens. The panel's decision was appealed, but plaintiffs had subsequently uncovered more direct evidence of the existence of such a strategy found on a computer belonging to and in the files of Thomas Hofeller, a recently deceased Republican consultant. Given that, they asked Hazel to reconsider his earlier ruling. On June 18, Hazel acknowledged that the request to reopen the issue had merit, saying their evidence "raises a substantial issue" in the case, that inclusion would favor Republicans and whites over minorities. This case is concurrent to Department of Commerce v. New York.

== See also ==
- List of African-American federal judges
- List of African-American jurists

Legal offices
Preceded by Alexander Williams Jr.	Judge of the United States District Court for the District of Maryland; 2014–2023	Succeeded by Brendan Hurson
