= Jack B. Johnson =

American politician

6th Executive of Prince George's County
- In office December 2, 2002 – December 6, 2010
- Preceded by: Wayne K. Curry
- Succeeded by: Rushern Baker
- Constituency: Prince George's County

State's Attorney of Prince George's County
- In office August 1994 – December 2002
- Preceded by: Alexander Williams Jr.
- Succeeded by: Glenn Ivey

Personal details
- Born: Jack Bruce Johnson; April 3, 1949 (age 77) Charleston, South Carolina, U.S.
- Party: Democratic
- Spouse: Leslie Johnson
- Education: Benedict College (BBA); Howard University (JD)
- Profession: Attorney

Military service
- Allegiance: United States of America
- Branch/service: United States Army
- Years of service: 1970–1976

Jack Bruce Johnson (born April 3, 1949) is a former American politician and lawyer. He was a Maryland state's attorney and was, from 2002 to 2010, the county executive of Prince George's County, Maryland. He was elected state's attorney in November 1994 and served as county executive from December 2002 to December 2010. On November 12, 2010, both Johnson and his wife were indicted on federal charges as part of a larger political corruption scandal in the county.

On May 17, 2011, Johnson pleaded guilty to extortion and witness- and evidence-tampering. He served most of his seven-year and three-month sentence at the Cumberland Federal Correctional Institution, with prisoner number 52777-037. On December 15, 2016, Johnson was released to a federal halfway house near Baltimore. He was released from federal custody in June 2017.

== Early life and education ==
Johnson grew up on Johns Island, located outside of Charleston, South Carolina. The fifth of ten children, Johnson's mother was a maid and his father was a farmer who raised white potatoes, okra, and string beans. He attended a segregated high school, which he claimed heavily shaped his worldview as a young person.

In 1970, Johnson received a bachelor's degree in business administration from Benedict College, an historically black school in Columbia, South Carolina. He also served in the United States Army from 1970 to 1976. After college, Johnson's goal was to "get a nice job" where he could "wear a suit", which led him to the accounting department of a life insurance company in New York City. Johnson returned to school soon after and graduated from Howard University School of Law in 1975 with a J.D. He entered into a legal career with the Internal Revenue Service, where he spent nearly a decade from 1975 to 1984 working as an attorney for the chief counsel. For a brief period from 1984 to 1987, Johnson was associate professor of tax law at North Carolina Central University School of Law.

== Career ==
=== State's Attorney ===
In 1985, Johnson was recruited into politics by serving as the campaign treasurer for Alexander Williams Jr., an old friend from law school vying for the State's Attorney office of Prince George's County. Williams defeated 24-year incumbent Arthur "Bud" Marshall, thereby becoming the first black person elected to a countywide office in Prince George's. After his election, Williams hired Johnson as Deputy State's Attorney. Johnson's responsibilities in that position included day-to-day management of the office, including administration of its $5 million budget.

Williams was appointed to a federal judgeship in 1994 by President Bill Clinton, opening the state's attorney seat for another politician. Soon after the news, Johnson announced his candidacy for the seat, surprising many of his colleagues who did not perceive political ambition in Johnson. However, Johnson built a strong community network and won the Democratic primary election with twice as many votes as the runner-up. He handily won the general election that November.

Johnson's tenure as top prosecutor in Prince George's was marked by an aggressive push against police brutality in the notoriously violent Prince George's County Police Department. He fired several deputy state's attorneys for refusing to prosecute officers, and his frequent battles with the police department brought a great deal of both positive and negative attention to his office. While his allies defended his aggressive push against the police as simply pursuing justice, opponents—including the police union—questioned his intentions and accused him of political grandstanding. One circuit court judge in the county even questioned Johnson's grasp of criminal law after dismissing one of his cases.

=== Executive of Prince George's County ===
Johnson was elected county executive in 2002 and re-elected in 2006. He served until his term expired on December 6, 2010.

A November 20, 2006, article in The Washington Post detailed excessive travel expenses claimed by Johnson:

Johnson flew business class to Senegal in December 2005 to attend a ribbon-cutting ceremony for homes built by a local developer. The cost of his travel was $6,003, charged to the county, and paid for by taxpayers. Johnson was quoted as saying, "I always fly business class or first class. I think the people of Prince George's County expect me to. I don't think they expect me to be riding in a seat with four across and I'm in the middle." Johnson again generated controversy by staying at the luxurious Bellagio Hotel and The Wynn when traveling to Las Vegas for recent shopping center conventions, two of the most expensive hotels in the city.

==== Corruption charges ====
In 2010, the Office of the Maryland State Prosecutor began investigating whether Johnson and four other Prince George's County council members had solicited bribes and favors while deliberating on a one-million-dollar annual lease for a county agency.

On November 12, 2010, Jack Johnson and his wife Leslie were arrested by the FBI as part of the federal probe of political corruption in Prince George's County. They were charged with witness tampering and destruction of evidence. According to court documents filed by the FBI, Johnson is accused of taking kickbacks and bribes in exchange for helping a developer secure federal funding for housing developments. Johnson can be heard on a wiretap instructing Leslie to locate and flush a $100,000 check from the developer down a toilet at their home and to hide $79,600 in cash in her bra as FBI agents knocked at the door of their home with a search warrant. The Johnsons were charged with crimes that carried a sentence of up to 20 years in jail for each offense, but they were both released with Jack Johnson being placed on home detention with electronic monitoring. Johnson remained in office until December 6, when his term expired; Leslie was sworn in as a newly elected county council member on the same day; however, she was not eligible to remain in the office if she were convicted of a felony.

On February 14, 2011, Johnson was indicted for allegedly soliciting more than $200,000 in bribes as part of a conspiracy that dates back to 2003. While Johnson is the only person named in the indictment, two unnamed developers were named co-conspirators in the indictment. The indictment reports that the FBI recorded conversations between Johnson, a developer and the county director of housing where cash bribes were solicited.

On May 17, 2011, Johnson agreed to a plea deal in which he pleaded guilty to extortion and witness- and evidence-tampering. Following Johnson's hearing, federal prosecutors revealed that former county housing director James Johnson (no relation) and developers Mirza Hussein Ali Baig and Patrick Ricker had pleaded guilty as part of a larger corruption probe. Leslie Johnson had been scheduled to plead guilty on May 3, but the hearing was abruptly canceled. Leslie Johnson pleaded guilty to federal corruption charges on June 30, 2011.

On December 6, 2011, Johnson was sentenced to seven years and three months in Butner federal prison in North Carolina. He was also fined $100,000.

Johnson continued serving his sentence after a move to the Cumberland Federal Correctional Institution, with prisoner number 52777-037. On December 15, 2016, Johnson was released to a federal halfway house near Baltimore to serve the remainder of his sentence. He was released from federal custody in June 2017 after serving more than five years, which included a reduction for good behavior.

== Personal life ==
Johnson had lived with wife, Leslie Johnson, who was a co-conspirator in the 2010 FBI investigation, and his three children in Mitchellville, Maryland. He is a member of the Omega Psi Phi fraternity.

Preceded by Alexander Williams Jr.	State's Attorney for Prince George's County, Maryland; 1994–2002	Succeeded by Glenn F. Ivey
Preceded by Wayne K. Curry	County Executive of Prince George's County, Maryland; 2002–2010	Succeeded by Rushern Baker
