= Anton–Schmidt equation of state =

Equation of State

The Anton–Schmidt equation is an empirical equation of state for crystalline solids, e.g. for pure metals or intermetallic compounds. Quantum mechanical investigations of intermetallic compounds show that the dependency of the pressure under isotropic deformation can be described empirically by

$$p(V) = - \beta \left(\frac{V}{V_0}\right)^n \ln\left(\frac{V}{V_0}\right)$$.

Integration of $p(V)$ leads to the equation of state for the total energy. The energy $E$ required to compress a solid to volume $V$ is

$$E(V) = - \int_V^\infty p(V^\prime) dV^\prime$$

which gives

$$E(V) = \frac{\beta V_0}{n+1} \left(\frac{V}{V_0}\right)^{n+1} \left[\ln\left(\frac{V}{V_0}\right) - \frac{1}{n+1}\right] + E_\infty$$.

The fitting parameters $\beta, n$ and $V_0$ are related to material properties, where

$\beta$ is the bulk modulus $K_0$ at equilibrium volume $V_0$.
$n$ correlates with the Grüneisen parameter $n = -\frac{1}{6} - \gamma_G$.

However, the fitting parameter $E_\infty$ does not reproduce the total energy of the free atoms.

The total energy equation is used to determine elastic and thermal material constants in quantum chemical simulation packages.

The equation of state has been used in cosmological contexts to describe the dark energy dynamics. However its use has been recently criticized since it appears disfavored than simpler equations of state adopted for the same purpose.

== See also ==
- Murnaghan equation of state
- Rose–Vinet equation of state
- Birch–Murnaghan equation of state
