= Murnaghan =

Murnaghan is a surname of Northern Irish origin, which means "loveable". The name may refer to:

- Dermot Murnaghan (1957–2026), British journalist
- Francis Dominic Murnaghan (mathematician) (1893–1976), Irish mathematician
- Francis Dominic Murnaghan, Jr. (1920–2000), American judge
- George Murnaghan (1847–1929), Irish politician
- Sarah Murnaghan (born 2002), American transplant recipient
- Sheelagh Murnaghan (1924–1993), British politician

== Other uses ==
- Murnaghan–Nakayama rule
- Murnaghan equation of state
- Murnaghan (programme)

== See also ==
- Monaghan (disambiguation)
