= Francis Murnaghan =

Francis Murnaghan may refer to:

- Francis Dominic Murnaghan (mathematician) (1893–1976), Irish mathematician
- Francis Dominic Murnaghan Jr. (1920–2000), U.S. federal judge, son of the latter
