= Judge Rubin =

Judge Rubin may refer to:

- Alvin Benjamin Rubin (1920–1991), judge of the United States Court of Appeals for the Fifth Circuit
- Carl Bernard Rubin (1920–1995), judge of the United States District Court for the Southern District of Ohio
- Julie Rubin (born 1972), judge of the United States District Court for the District of Maryland
