= Francis Birch =

Francis Birch may refer to:

- Francis Birch (cryptographer) (1889–1956), British cryptographer and actor
- Francis Birch (geophysicist) (1903–1992), American geophysicist
