= Pamela Harris (judge) =

American judge (born 1962)

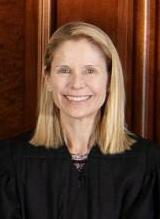
- Harris in 2022

Judge of the United States Court of Appeals for the Fourth Circuit
- Incumbent
- Assumed office July 29, 2014
- Appointed by: Barack Obama
- Preceded by: Andre M. Davis

Personal details
- Born: September 23, 1962 (age 63) Hartford, Connecticut, U.S.
- Education: Yale University (BA, JD)

Pamela Ann Harris (born September 23, 1962) is a United States circuit judge of the United States Court of Appeals for the Fourth Circuit. Prior to joining the federal bench, she was an associate professor at the University of Pennsylvania Law School, and visiting professor at the Georgetown University Law Center and executive director of its Supreme Court Institute.

== Early life and education ==
Harris graduated from Walt Whitman High School in Bethesda, Maryland. She received a Bachelor of Arts degree, summa cum laude, in 1985 from Yale College. She received a Juris Doctor in 1990 from Yale Law School. She served as a law clerk to Judge Harry T. Edwards of the United States Court of Appeals for the District of Columbia Circuit, from 1990 to 1991. She worked as an associate at the law firm of Shea & Gardner (now Goodwin Procter LLP) in Washington, D.C. from 1991 to 1992. She served as a law clerk to Justice John Paul Stevens of the United States Supreme Court, from 1992 to 1993.

== Career ==
Harris served as an attorney-advisor in the United States Department of Justice's Office of Legal Counsel, from 1993 to 1996. From 1996 to 1999, she was an associate professor at the University of Pennsylvania Law School, earning the Harvey Levin Memorial Teaching Award. She previously served as the Principal Deputy Assistant Attorney General of the Office of Legal Policy at the United States Department of Justice. She joined O'Melveny & Myers LLP as counsel in 1999, where she specialized in appellate and Supreme Court litigation, becoming partner in 2005. Beginning in 2007, concurrently with her private practice, she co-directed Harvard Law School's Supreme Court and Appellate Practice Clinic and was a visiting professor at Georgetown University Law Center. In 2009, she was named the Executive Director of the Supreme Court Institute at Georgetown, serving in that position until 2010, when she joined the Office of Legal Policy. She returned to Georgetown in 2012 and served in that capacity until her appointment as a federal judge in 2014.

=== Federal judicial service ===
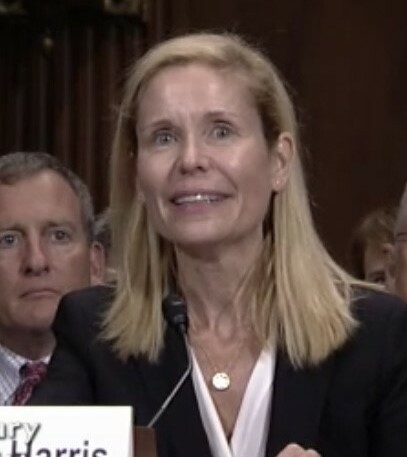
U.S. Senate Judiciary Committee hearing

On May 8, 2014, President Barack Obama nominated Harris to serve as a United States Circuit Judge of the United States Court of Appeals for the Fourth Circuit, to the seat vacated by Judge Andre M. Davis, who assumed senior status on February 28, 2014. She received a hearing on her nomination on Tuesday, June 24, 2014. On July 17, 2014, her nomination was reported out of committee by a 10–8 vote. On July 22, 2014, U.S. Senate Majority Leader Harry Reid filed for cloture on Harris's nomination. On July 24, 2014, the United States Senate invoked cloture on her nomination by a 54–41 vote. On July 28, 2014, her nomination was confirmed by a 50–43 vote. She received her judicial commission the next day.

In 2024, Judge Harris joined Judge Toby Heytens in a 2-1 decision on West Virginia v. B.P.J., where she held that "West Virginia cannot enforce its anti-transgender sports ban against a 13-year-old girl."

== Personal life ==
Harris is married to Austin Schlick, Executive Director of the U.S. Consumer Product Safety Commission and former Federal Communications Commission general counsel.

== See also ==
- List of Jewish American jurists
- List of law clerks for the fourth seat of the Supreme Court of the United States

Legal offices
Preceded by Andre M. Davis	Judge of the United States Court of Appeals for the Fourth Circuit; 2014–present	Incumbent
