= Ellen Lipton Hollander =

American judge (born 1949)

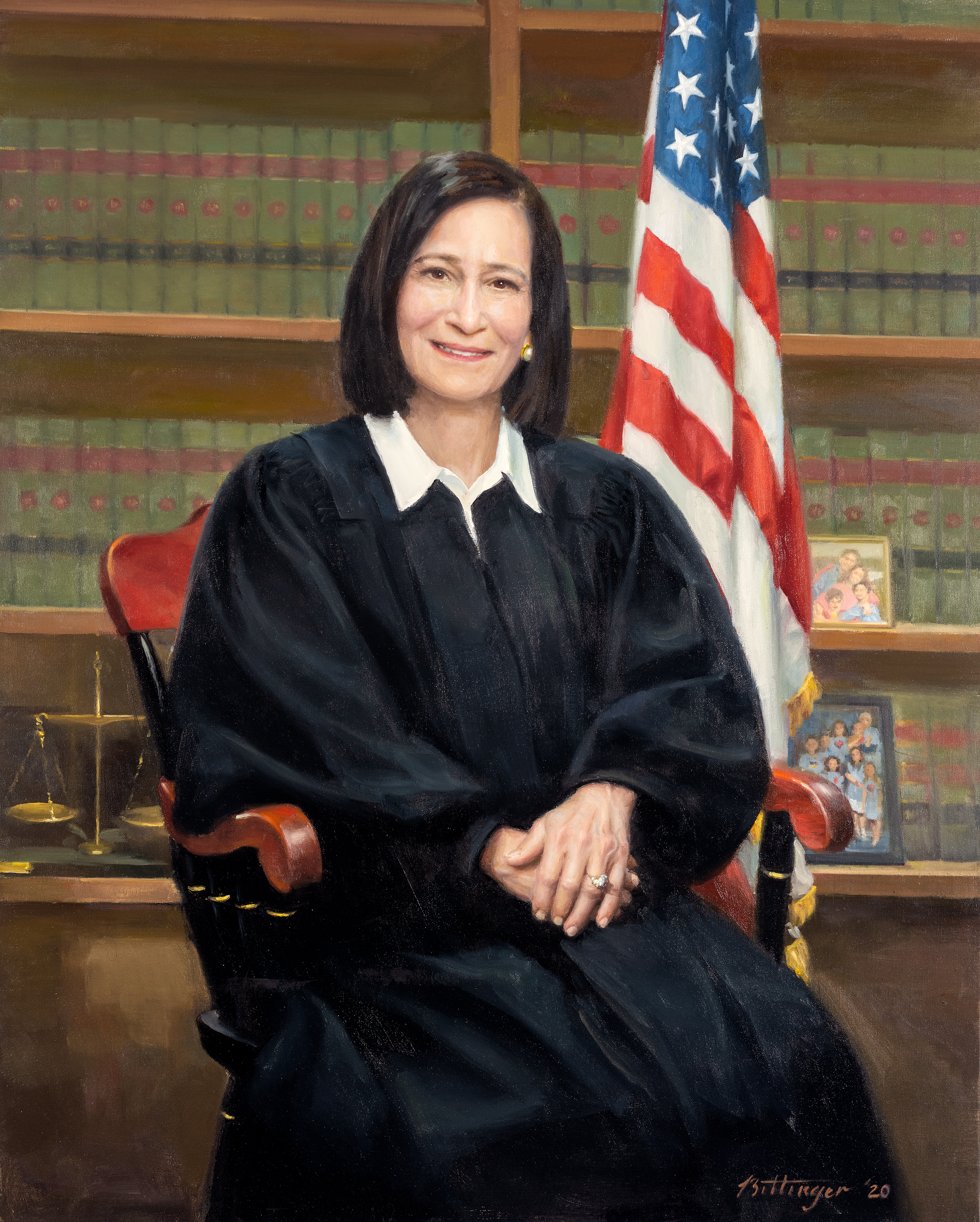
- Official portrait by Ned Bittinger, 2012

Senior Judge of the United States District Court for the District of Maryland
- Incumbent
- Assumed office January 4, 2022

Judge of the United States District Court for the District of Maryland
- In office December 28, 2010 – January 4, 2022
- Appointed by: Barack Obama
- Preceded by: Andre M. Davis
- Succeeded by: Julie Rubin

Personal details
- Born: Ellen Frances Lipton; 1949 (age 76–77) New York City, New York, U.S.
- Education: Goucher College (BA); Georgetown University (JD)

Ellen Frances Lipton Hollander (born 1949) is a senior United States district judge of the United States District Court for the District of Maryland.

== Early life and education ==
Born Ellen Frances Lipton in 1949, in New York, New York, she received her Bachelor of Arts in 1971 from Goucher College, then attended Hofstra University School of Law during the 1971 – 1972 academic year, but received no degree. She later obtained her Juris Doctor from Georgetown University Law Center in 1974. Hollander is Jewish.

== Career ==
Between 1974 and 1975, Hollander was a law clerk to Judge James Rogers Miller Jr. of the United States District Court for the District of Maryland. Hollander was in private practice as an associate in the litigation department for the law firm of Frank, Bernstein, Conaway & Goldman in Baltimore, Maryland, from 1975 to 1979. In 1979, she became an Assistant Attorney General in the civil division for the Office of the Maryland Attorney General. She was an Assistant United States Attorney in the District of Maryland from 1979 to 1983. Between 1983 and 1989, Hollander went back into private practice with Frank, Bernstein, Conaway & Goldman, where she worked her way from an associate to partner. She was a judge on the Circuit Court for Baltimore City from 1989 to 1994. She then was a judge on the Maryland Court of Special Appeals (the state's intermediate appellate court) from 1994 until she became a federal judge.

=== Federal judicial service ===
In April 2009, Hollander wrote to Senators Barbara Mikulski and Benjamin Cardin expressing interest in her nomination to the United States District Court for the District of Maryland with respect to an anticipated vacancy. In June 2009, she submitted a written application to the merit selection committee composed of members of the Maryland Bar Association. She interviewed with the committee and became one of the persons on the short list of candidates submitted to the Senators. She was recommended by Cardin and Mikulski to President Barack Obama in December 2009. Hollander was formally nominated on April 21, 2010, and her nomination was confirmed on December 18, 2010. She received her commission on December 28, 2010. Hollander assumed senior status on January 4, 2022.

== Notable cases ==
In BP P.L.C. v. Mayor and City Council of Baltimore, a June 2019 ruling, Hollander ruled for the city of Baltimore that they could receive damages for climate liability in the city. The 4th circuit affirmed Hollander's ruling, but the U.S. Supreme Court, in overturning Hollander's ruling, found that more factors had to be considered. However, Sara Gross, a lawyer for Baltimore, noted that “Judge Hollander has already rejected every single one of the fossil fuel defendants’ arguments, as have federal district court judges in ten other climate damage and deception cases around the country".

== Personal ==
Hollander married her husband, Rich Hollander, in 1972. The couple has three children, including Baltimore Orioles broadcaster Brett Hollander.

== See also ==
- List of Jewish American jurists

Legal offices
Preceded by Andre M. Davis	Judge of the United States District Court for the District of Maryland; 2010–2022	Succeeded by Julie Rubin
