= Rose–Vinet equation of state =

The Rose–Vinet equation of state is a set of equations used to describe the equation of state of solid objects. It is a modification of the Birch–Murnaghan equation of state. The initial paper discusses how the equation only depends on four inputs: the isothermal bulk modulus $B_0$, the derivative of bulk modulus with respect to pressure $B_0'$, the volume $V_0$, and the thermal expansion; all evaluated at zero pressure ($P=0$) and at a single (reference) temperature. The same equation holds for all classes of solids and a wide range of temperatures.

Let the cube root of the specific volume be

$$\eta=\left({\frac{V}{V_0}}\right)^{\frac{1}{3}}$$

then the equation of state is:

$$P=3B_0\left(\frac{1-\eta}{\eta^2}\right)e^{\frac{3}{2}(B_0'-1)(1-\eta)}$$

A similar equation was published by Stacey et al. in 1981.
