= Kronecker coefficient =

Of a Kronecker product (combinatorics)

In mathematics, Kronecker coefficients g^{λ}_{μν} describe the decomposition of the tensor product (= Kronecker product) of two irreducible representations of a symmetric group into irreducible representations. They play an important role in algebraic combinatorics and geometric complexity theory. They were introduced by Murnaghan in 1938.

== Definition ==
Given a partition λ of n, write V_{λ} for the Specht module associated to λ. Then the Kronecker coefficients g^{λ}_{μν} are given by the rule

$$V_\mu \otimes V_\nu = \bigoplus_\lambda g_{\mu \nu}^{\lambda} V_\lambda.$$

One can interpret this on the level of symmetric functions, giving a formula for the Kronecker product of two Schur polynomials:

$$s_\mu \star s_\nu = \sum_{\lambda} g_{\mu \nu}^{\lambda} s_\lambda.$$

This is to be compared with Littlewood–Richardson coefficients, where one instead considers the induced representation

$$\uparrow_{S_{|\mu|} \times S_{|\nu|}}^{S_{|\lambda|}} \left ( V_\mu \otimes V_\nu \right ) = \bigoplus_\lambda c_{\mu \nu}^{\lambda} V_\lambda,$$

and the corresponding operation of symmetric functions is the usual product. Also note that the Littlewood–Richardson coefficients are the analogue of the Kronecker coefficients for representations of GL_{n}, i.e. if we write W_{λ} for the irreducible representation corresponding to λ (where λ has at most n parts), one gets that

$$W_\mu \otimes W_\nu = \bigoplus_\lambda c_{\mu \nu}^{\lambda} W_\lambda.$$

== Properties ==
Bürgisser & Ikenmeyer (2008) showed that computing Kronecker coefficients is #P-hard and contained in GapP. A later work by Ikenmeyer, Mulmuley & Walter (2017) shows that deciding whether a given Kronecker coefficient is non-zero is NP-hard. This interest in computational complexity of these coefficients arises from its relevance in the Geometric Complexity Theory program.

A major unsolved problem in representation theory and combinatorics is to give a combinatorial description of the Kronecker coefficients. It has been open since 1938, when Murnaghan asked for such a combinatorial description. A combinatorial description would also imply that the problem is #P-complete in light of the above result.

The Kronecker coefficients can be computed as
$$g(\lambda, \mu, \nu) = \frac{1}{n!} \sum_{\sigma \in S_n} \chi^{\lambda}(\sigma)\chi^{\mu}(\sigma)\chi^{\nu}(\sigma),$$
where $\chi^{\lambda}(\sigma)$ is the character value of the irreducible representation corresponding to integer partition $\lambda$ on a permutation $\sigma \in S_n$.

The Kronecker coefficients also appear in the generalized Cauchy identity
$$\sum_{\lambda, \mu, \nu} g(\lambda, \mu , \nu) s_\lambda(x)s_\mu(y)s_\nu(z) = \prod_{i,j,k} \frac{1}{1-x_iy_jz_k}.$$

== See also ==
- Littlewood–Richardson coefficient
