= Andre M. Davis =

American judge (born 1949)

Andre Davis
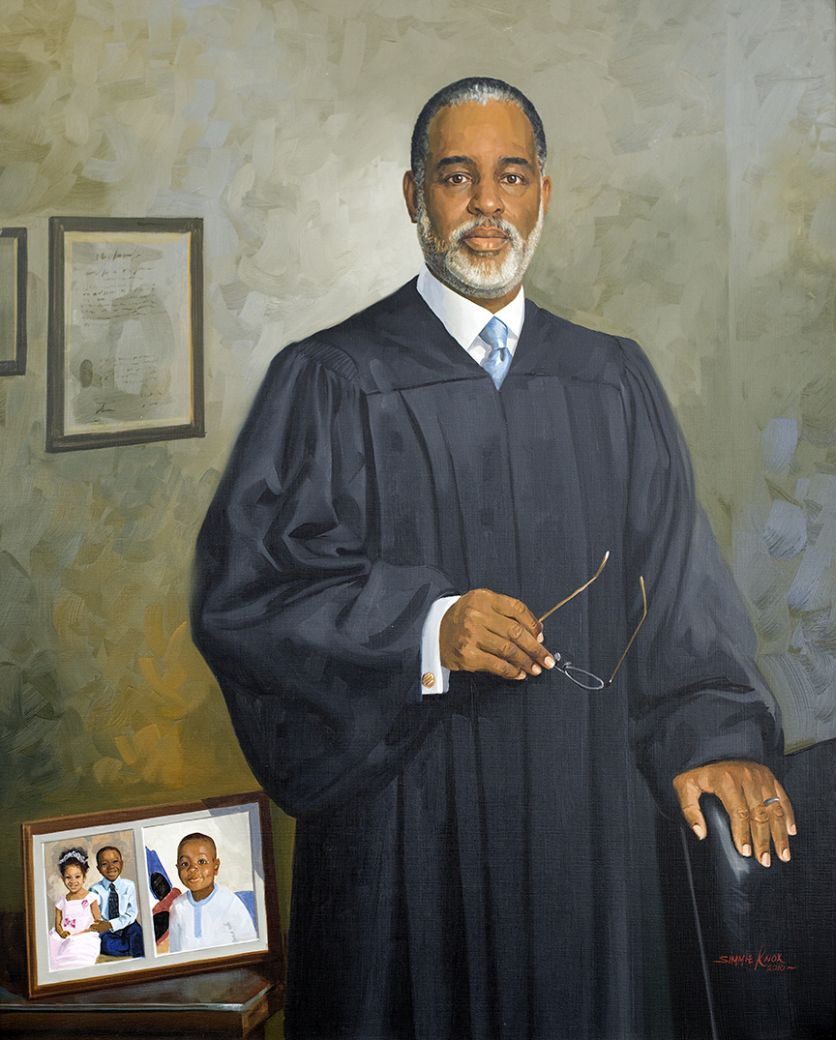
- Official portrait by Simmie Knox

Senior Judge of the United States Court of Appeals for the Fourth Circuit
- In office February 28, 2014 – August 31, 2017

Judge of the United States Court of Appeals for the Fourth Circuit
- In office November 10, 2009 – February 28, 2014
- Appointed by: Barack Obama
- Preceded by: Francis Dominic Murnaghan Jr.
- Succeeded by: Pamela Harris

Judge of the United States District Court for the District of Maryland
- In office August 14, 1995 – November 12, 2009
- Appointed by: Bill Clinton
- Preceded by: Walter Evan Black Jr.
- Succeeded by: Ellen Lipton Hollander

Personal details
- Born: Andre Maurice Davis; February 11, 1949 (age 77) Baltimore, Maryland, U.S.
- Education: University of Pennsylvania (BA); University of Maryland, Baltimore (JD)

Andre Maurice Davis (born February 11, 1949) is the former city solicitor for Baltimore and a former United States circuit judge of the United States Court of Appeals for the Fourth Circuit. He was formerly a United States district judge and was nominated first for a seat on the United States Court of Appeals for the Fourth Circuit by President Bill Clinton in 2000. He was renominated to the Fourth Circuit by President Barack Obama on April 2, 2009, and he was confirmed by the Senate on November 9, 2009. On February 28, 2014 Davis assumed senior status. Davis retired from the federal bench to become the City Solicitor for the City of Baltimore of which he served from 2017 to 2020.

== Early life and education ==
Born in Baltimore, Maryland, Davis grew up in East Baltimore. His father was a schoolteacher, his mother was a food services worker and his stepfather was a steel worker, according to an October 12, 2000 article in the Baltimore Sun. As an early participant in the Ford Foundation's A Better Chance (ABC) program, Davis attended Phillips Andover Academy for high school, and earned a Bachelor of Arts degree in American history from the University of Pennsylvania in 1971. Although he had planned to become a college professor, Davis chose to pursue a career in the law after taking an undergraduate course in constitutional law, according to the October 12, 2000 article in the Baltimore Sun. Davis earned a Juris Doctor from the University of Maryland School of Law in 1978. At the University of Maryland, Davis won the Myerowitz Moot Court Competition in 1977 and was thus elected to the law school's three-member National Moot Court Team.

== Professional career ==
Prior to law school, Davis served as an assistant housing manager and equal opportunity specialist with the Housing Authority of Baltimore City. After graduating from law school, Davis clerked for United States District Judge Frank Kaufman of the United States District Court for the District of Maryland from 1978 until 1979. Davis then clerked from 1979 until 1980 for Judge Francis Dominic Murnaghan Jr. of the Fourth Circuit. From 1980 until 1981, Davis worked as an appellate attorney for the United States Department of Justice's Civil Rights Division. In 1981, Davis joined the United States Attorney's office for the District of Maryland as an Assistant United States Attorney until 1983, when he entered private practice. From 1984 until 1987, Davis worked as an assistant professor for the University of Maryland School of Law. He became a judge in 1987, when he was appointed to be an associate judge for the District Court of Maryland for Baltimore City. From 1990 until 1995, Davis worked as an associate judge for the Circuit Court for Baltimore City.

== Federal judicial service ==
=== District court service ===
On May 4, 1995, President Bill Clinton nominated Davis to be a United States district judge of the United States District Court for the District of Maryland to a seat vacated by Judge Walter Evan Black Jr., who assumed senior status on October 21, 1994.The United States Senate confirmed Davis by a voice vote on August 11, 1995. He received his commission on August 14, 1995. His service terminated on November 12, 2009, due to elevation to the Fourth Circuit. In discussing his judicial philosophy, Davis told the Baltimore Sun in an article that was published on October 12, 2000 that "I want the loser—and I know there's always going to be a loser, that's the nature of the beast—but I want the loser to be able to say, 'I lost, but I was heard, and I believe that judge gave me every consideration in hearing my side.

=== Court of Appeals service ===
On October 12, 2000, President Clinton nominated Davis to be a judge for the United States Court of Appeals for the Fourth Circuit, to a seat vacated by Judge Francis Dominic Murnaghan Jr., who died on August 31, 2000. The nomination was a part of Clinton's effort to integrate the Fourth Circuit, which up to that point had never had an African-American judge; however, since Davis was nominated after July 1, 2000, the unofficial start date of the Thurmond Rule during a presidential election year, no hearings were scheduled on his nomination, and the nomination was returned to Clinton at the end of his term. President George W. Bush chose not to renominate Davis to the Fourth Circuit.

On April 2, 2009, President Barack Obama renominated Davis to the same seat of the United States Court of Appeals for the Fourth Circuit. On June 4, 2009, the Senate Judiciary Committee approved the nomination by a 17–3 vote. On November 9, 2009, the Senate confirmed Davis by a 72–16 vote. He received his commission on November 10, 2009. Davis assumed senior status on February 28, 2014. Davis retired from active federal judicial service on August 31, 2017, and was named City Solicitor for the City of Baltimore by Mayor Catherine Pugh, effective September 1, 2017. Davis retired from that position on March 1, 2020.

== See also ==
- Bill Clinton judicial appointment controversies
- List of African-American federal judges
- List of African-American jurists

Legal offices
Preceded by Walter Evan Black Jr.	Judge of the United States District Court for the District of Maryland; 1995–2009	Succeeded by Ellen Lipton Hollander
Preceded by Francis Dominic Murnaghan Jr.	Judge of the United States Court of Appeals for the Fourth Circuit; 2009–2014	Succeeded by Pamela Harris
