= Francis Birch (geophysicist) =

American geophysicist (1903–1992)

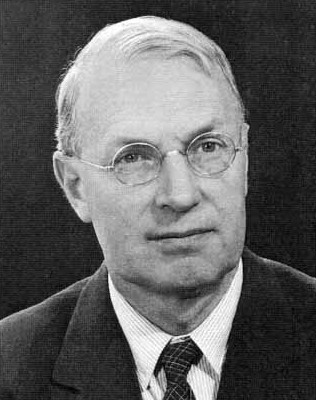
- Birch, c. 1970
- Born: August 22, 1903; Washington, D.C.
- Died: 30 January 1992 (aged 88); Cambridge, Massachusetts
- Education: Harvard University
- Known for: Birch's law Birch-Murnaghan equation of state
- Spouse: Barbara Channing
- Awards: Legion of Merit (1945); Arthur L. Day Medal (1950); William Bowie Medal (1960); National Medal of Science (1967); Vetlesen Prize (1968); Penrose Medal (1969); Gold Medal of the Royal Astronomical Society (1973)
- Scientific career
- Fields: Geophysics
- Workplaces: Harvard University
- Doctoral advisor: Percy Bridgman

Albert Francis Birch (August 22, 1903 – January 30, 1992) was an American geophysicist. He is considered one of the founders of solid Earth geophysics. He is also known for his part in the atomic bombing of Hiroshima and Nagasaki.

During World War II, Birch participated in the Manhattan Project, working on the design and development of the gun-type nuclear weapon known as Little Boy. He oversaw its manufacture, and went to Tinian to supervise its assembly and loading into Enola Gay, the Boeing B-29 Superfortress tasked with dropping the bomb.

A graduate of Harvard University, Birch began working on geophysics as a research assistant. He subsequently spent his entire career at Harvard working in the field, becoming an associate professor of geology in 1943, a professor in 1946, and Sturgis Hooper Professor of Geology in 1949, and professor emeritus in 1974.

Birch published over 100 papers. He developed what is now known as the Birch-Murnaghan equation of state in 1947. In 1952 he demonstrated that Earth's mantle is chiefly composed of silicate minerals, with an inner and outer core of molten iron. In two 1961 papers on compressional wave velocities, he established what is now called Birch's law.

== Early life ==
Birch was born in Washington, D.C., on August 22, 1903, the son of George Albert Birch, who was involved in banking and real estate, and Mary Hemmick Birch, a church choir singer and soloist at St. Matthew's Cathedral in Washington, D.C. He had three younger brothers: David, who became a banker; John, who became a diplomat; and Robert, who became a songwriter. He was educated at Washington, D.C., schools, and Western High School, where he joined the High School Cadets in 1916.

In 1920 Birch entered Harvard University on a scholarship. While there he served in Harvard's Reserve Officers' Training Corps Field Artillery Battalion. He graduated magna cum laude in 1924, and received his Bachelor of Science (S.B.) degree in electrical engineering.

Birch went to work in the Engineering Department of the New York Telephone Company. He applied for and received an American Field Service Fellowship in 1926, which he used to travel to Strasbourg, and study at the University of Strasbourg's Institut de Physique under the tutelage of Pierre Weiss. There, he wrote or co-wrote four papers, in French, on topics such as the paramagnetic properties of potassium cyanide, and the magnetic moment of Cu++ ions.

On returning to the United States in 1928, Birch went back to Harvard to pursue physics. He was awarded his Master of Arts (A.M.) degree in 1929, and then commenced work on his 1932 Doctor of Philosophy (Ph.D.) degree under the supervision of Percy Bridgman, who would receive the Nobel Prize for Physics in 1946. For his thesis, Birch measured the vapor-liquid critical point of mercury. He determined this as 1460±20 °C and 1640±50 kg/cm^{2}, results he published in 1932 in the Physical Review.

Around this time, there was an increased interest in geophysics at Harvard University, and Reginald Aldworth Daly established a Committee for Experimental Geology and Geophysics that included Bridgman, astronomer Harlow Shapley, geologists Louis Caryl Graton and D. H. McLaughlin and chemist G. P. Baxter. William Zisman, another one of Bridgman's Ph.D. students, was hired as the committee's research associate, but, having little interest in the study of rocks, he resigned in 1932. The position was then offered to Birch, who had little interest or experience in geology either, but with the advent of the Great Depression, jobs were hard to find, and he accepted.

On July 15, 1933, Birch married Barbara Channing, a Bryn Mawr College alumna, and a collateral descendant of the theologian William Ellery Channing. They had three children: Anne Campaspe, Francis (Frank) Sylvanus and Mary Narcissa. Frank later became a professor of geophysics at the University of New Hampshire.

== World War II ==
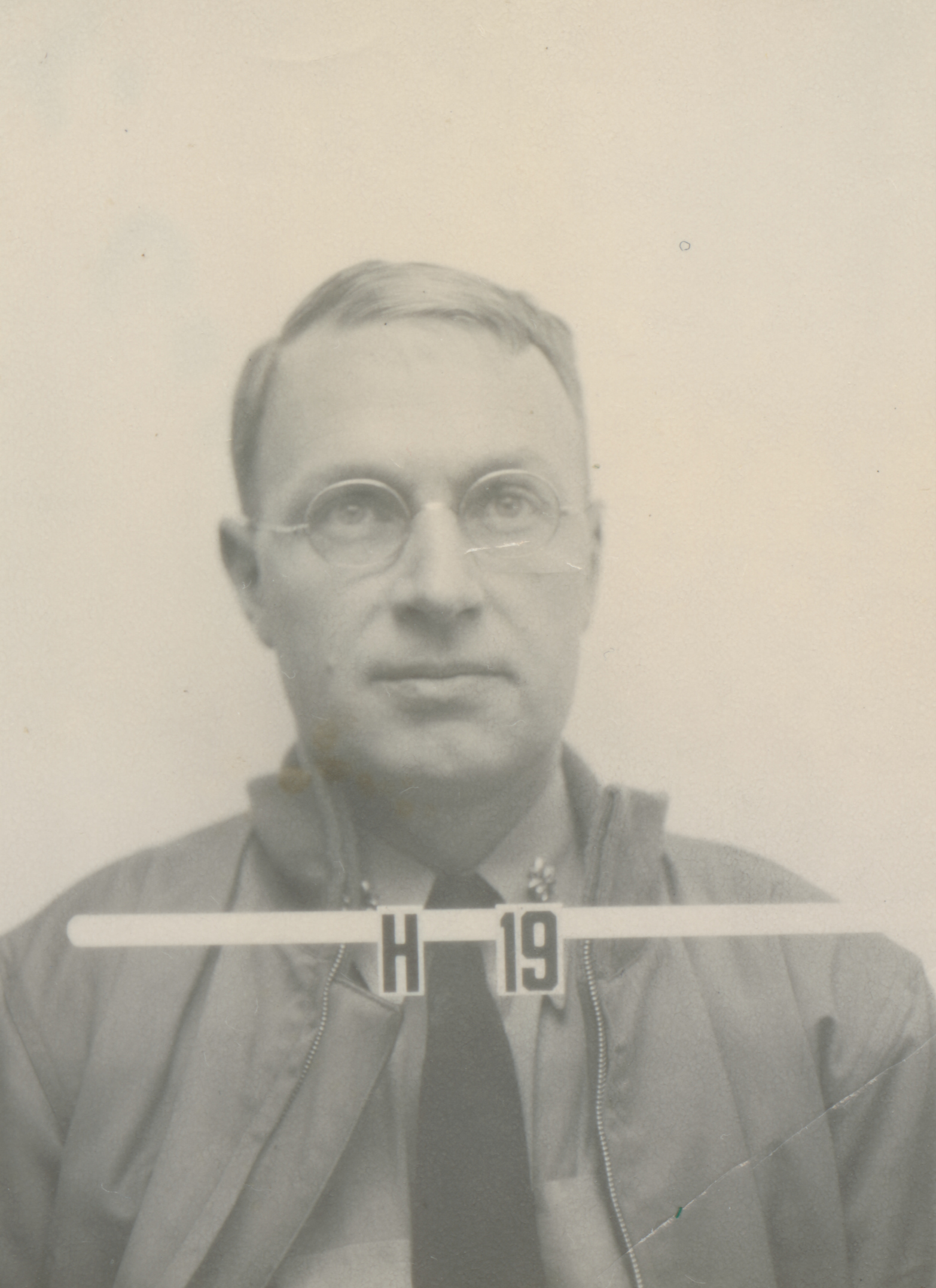
Birch's Los Alamos badge

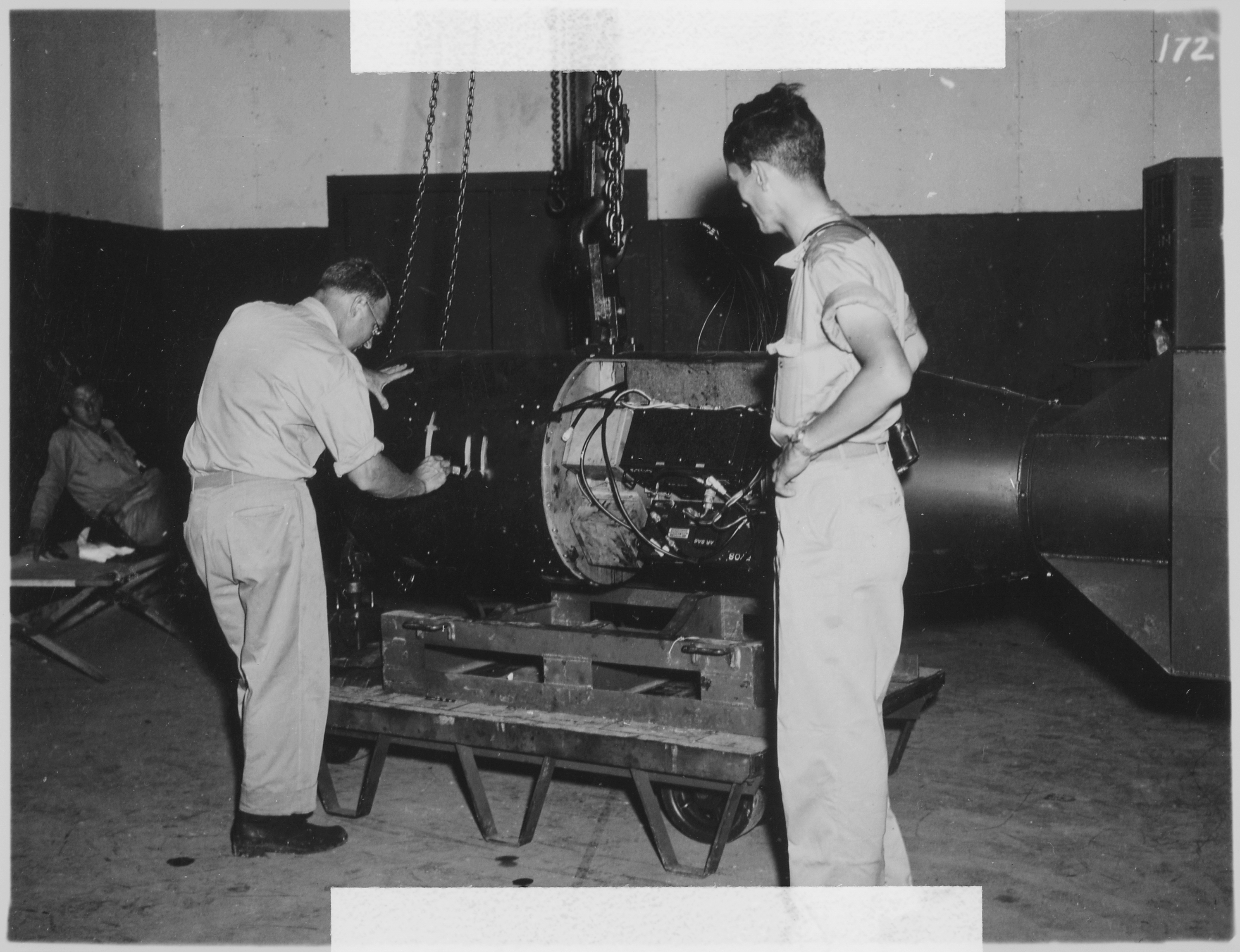
Birch (left) works on the Little Boy bomb while Norman F. Ramsey (right) looks on

In 1942, during World War II, Birch took a leave of absence from Harvard, in order to work at the Massachusetts Institute of Technology Radiation Laboratory, which was developing radar. He worked on the proximity fuze, a radar-triggered fuze that would explode a shell in the proximity of a target. The following year he accepted a commission in the United States Navy as a lieutenant commander, and was posted to the Bureau of Ships in Washington, D.C.

Later that year he was assigned to the Manhattan Project, and moved with his family to Los Alamos, New Mexico. There he joined the Los Alamos Laboratory's Ordnance (O) Division, which was under the command of another Naval officer, Captain William S. Parsons. Initially the goal of the O Division was to design a gun-type nuclear weapon known as Thin Man. This proved to be impractical due to contamination of the reactor-bred plutonium with plutonium-240, and in February 1944, the Division switched its attention to the development of the Little Boy, a smaller device using uranium-235. Birch used unenriched uranium to create scale models and later full-scale mock-ups of the device.

Birch supervised the manufacture of the Little Boy, and went to Tinian to supervise its assembly and loading it onto Enola Gay, the Boeing B-29 Superfortress tasked with dropping the bomb. He devised the 'double plug' system that allowed for actually arming the bomb after Enola Gay took off so that if it crashed, there would not be a nuclear explosion. He was awarded the Legion of Merit. His citation read:

for exceptionally meritorious conduct in the performance of outstanding services to the Government of the United States in connection with the development of the greatest military weapon of all time, the atomic bomb. His initial assignment was the instrumentation of laboratory and field tests. He carried out this assignment in such outstanding fashion that he was placed in charge of the engineering and development of the first atomic bomb. He carried out this assignment with outstanding judgment and skill, and finally, went with the bomb to the advanced base where he insured, by his care and leadership, that the bomb was adequately prepared in every respect. Commander Birch's engineering ability, understanding of all principles involved, professional skill and devotion to duty throughout the development and delivery of the atomic bomb were outstanding and were in keeping with the highest traditions of the United States Naval Service.

Birch was promoted to commander and released from the Navy in 1945.

== Post-war ==
Birch returned to Harvard after the war ended, having been promoted to associate professor of geology in 1943 while he was away. He would remain at Harvard for the rest of his career, becoming a professor in 1946, and Sturgis Hooper Professor of Geology in 1949, and professor emeritus in 1974. Professor Birch published over 100 papers. He served as president of The Geological Society of America in 1964 and was awarded their Penrose Medal in 1969.

In 1947, he adapted the isothermal Murnaghan equation of state, which had been developed for infinitesimal strain, for Eulerian finite strain, developing what is now known as the Birch-Murnaghan equation of state.

Albert Francis Birch is known for his experimental work on the properties of Earth-forming minerals at high pressure and temperature, in 1952 he published a well-known paper in the Journal of Geophysical Research, where he demonstrated that the mantle is chiefly composed of silicate minerals, the upper and lower mantle are separated by a thin transition zone associated with silicate phase transitions, and the inner and outer core are alloys of crystalline and molten iron. His conclusions are still accepted as correct today. The most famous portion of the paper, however, is a humorous footnote he included in the introduction:

Unwary readers should take warning that ordinary language undergoes modification to a high-pressure form when applied to the interior of the Earth. A few examples of equivalents follow:

High Pressure Form	Ordinary Meaning
Certain	Dubious
Undoubtedly	Perhaps
Positive proof	Vague suggestion
Unanswerable argument	Trivial objection
Pure iron	Uncertain mixture of all the elements

In 1961, Birch published two papers on compressional wave velocities establishing a linear relation of the compressional wave velocity V_{p} of rocks and minerals of a constant average atomic weight $\bar{ M}$ with density $\rho$ as:

$V_p = a (\bar{ M}) + b \rho$.

This relationship became known as Birch's law. Birch was elected to the American Academy of Arts and Sciences in 1942, the National Academy of Sciences in 1950, the American Philosophical Society in 1955, and served as the president of the Geological Society of America in 1963 and 1964. He received numerous honors in his career, including the Geological Society of America's Arthur L. Day Medal on 1950 and Penrose Medal in 1969, the American Geophysical Union's William Bowie Medal in 1960, the National Medal of Science from President Lyndon Johnson in 1967, the Vetlesen Prize (shared with Sir Edward Bullard) in 1968, the Gold Medal of the Royal Astronomical Society in 1973, and the International Association for the Advancement of High Pressure Research's Bridgman Award in 1983. Since 1992, the American Geophysical Union's Tectonophysics section has sponsored a Francis Birch Lecture, given at its annual meeting by a noted researcher in this field.

Birch died of prostate cancer at his home in Cambridge, Massachusetts, on January 30, 1992. He was survived by wife Barbara, his three children and his three brothers. His papers are in the Harvard University Archives.
