= Julie Rubin =

American judge (born 1972)

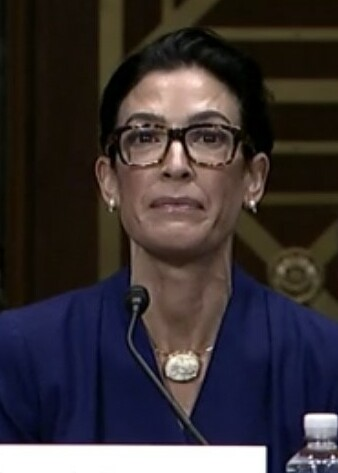
- Julie Rubin in 2021

Judge of the United States District Court for the District of Maryland
- Incumbent
- Assumed office March 30, 2022
- Appointed by: Joe Biden
- Preceded by: Ellen Lipton Hollander

Judge of the 8th Judicial Circuit of the Baltimore City Circuit Court
- In office January 9, 2013 – March 30, 2022

Personal details
- Born: 1972 (age 53–54) Baltimore, Maryland, U.S.
- Education: Mount Holyoke College (BA); University of Maryland (JD)

Julie Rebecca Rubin (born 1972) is a United States district judge of the United States District Court for the District of Maryland. She served as Maryland state court judge from 2013 to 2022.

== Early life and education ==
Rubin was born in 1972, in Baltimore, Maryland. She received her Bachelor of Arts, cum laude, from Mount Holyoke College in 1995 and her Juris Doctor from the University of Maryland School of Law in 1998.

== Career ==
From 1998 to 2000, Rubin was an associate at the Baltimore law firm Shapiro and Olander, P.A. From 2000 to 2012, she worked at Astrachan Gunst Thomas Rubin, P.C. in Baltimore where she handled intellectual property and employment law matters. She served as a judge of the 8th Judicial Circuit of the Baltimore City Circuit Court from January 9, 2013, to March 30, 2022.

Rubin was a member of the legal committee of Baltimore Neighborhoods, Inc., from 2010 to 2013.

=== Federal judicial service ===
On November 3, 2021, President Joe Biden nominated Rubin to serve as a United States district judge of the United States District Court for the District of Maryland. Biden nominated Rubin to the seat being vacated by Judge Ellen Lipton Hollander, who announced her intent to assume senior status upon confirmation of a successor. On December 15, 2021, a hearing on her nomination was held before the Senate Judiciary Committee. On January 3, 2022, her nomination was returned to the President under Rule XXXI, Paragraph 6 of the United States Senate; she was renominated the same day. On January 20, 2022, her nomination was reported out of committee by a 13–9 vote. On March 16, 2022, the Senate invoked cloture on her nomination by a 52–45 vote. On March 23, 2022, her nomination was confirmed by a 51–46 vote. She received her judicial commission on March 30, 2022. She was sworn in on April 6, 2022.

== See also ==
- List of Jewish American jurists

Legal offices
Preceded by Ellen Lipton Hollander	Judge of the United States District Court for the District of Maryland; 2022–present	Incumbent
