= Francis Dominic Murnaghan (mathematician) =

Irish American mathematician

Francis Dominic Murnaghan (August 4, 1893 – March 24, 1976) was an Irish mathematician and former head of the mathematics department at Johns Hopkins University. His name is attached to developments in group theory and mathematics applied to continuum mechanics (Murnaghan and Birch–Murnaghan equations of state).

== Biography ==
Frank Murnaghan was born in Omagh, County Tyrone, Ireland, seventh of the nine children of George Murnaghan, a Nationalist MP representing Mid Tyrone constituency. He graduated from Irish Christian Brothers secondary school in 1910, and University College Dublin with first-class honours BSc in Mathematical Sciences in 1913. Following an MSc in 1914, he was awarded a National University of Ireland (NUI) Travelling Studentship, which funded him to pursue his doctorate at Johns Hopkins University. In 1916, after just two years working under department chair Frank Morley's new PhD student Harry Bateman, he was awarded the Ph.D.

He then lectured at Rice University, and returned to Johns Hopkins University with the rank of associate professor at the young age of 25. In 1928 he was promoted to Professor and became only the fourth head of the Department of Mathematics (after J.J. Sylvester, Simon Newcomb and Frank Morley). After his retirement in 1949, he worked at the Instituto Tecnológico de Aeronáutica near São Paulo, Brazil, but returned to Baltimore in 1959. He continued working as a consultant for the Marine Engineering Laboratory; his last publication appeared in 1972.

Murnaghan was a member of US National Academy of Sciences, American Philosophical Society, Royal Irish Academy, and Brazilian Academy of Sciences. He wrote 15 books, some in English and some in Portuguese, and over 90 papers.

He was the father of Francis Dominic Murnaghan, Jr., former U.S. federal judge and uncle of Northern Irish barrister and politician Sheelagh Murnaghan.

== Selected publications ==
- — (May 1921). "A cubic space curve connected with the tetrahedron". The American Mathematical Monthly. 28 (5): 203–206. doi:10.2307/2973752. JSTOR 2973752.
- 1922: Vector Analysis and the Theory of Relativity, Johns Hopkins University Press @ Internet Archive
- — (1925). "The tensor character of the generalized Kronecker symbol". Bull. Amer. Math. Soc. 31 (7): 323–329. doi:10.1090/S0002-9904-1925-04043-4.
- — (1927). "The Cauchy-Heaviside expansion formula and the Boltzmann-Hopkinson principle of superposition". Bull. Amer. Math. Soc. 33: 81–89. doi:10.1090/S0002-9904-1927-04317-8.
- — (1929). "Modern hydrodynamical theory, with special reference to aeronautics". Bull. Amer. Math. Soc. 35 (3): 294–318. doi:10.1090/S0002-9904-1929-04734-7.
- 1944: —. "The Compressibility of Media under Extreme Pressures". Proceedings of the National Academy of Sciences of the United States of America. 30 (9): 244–247. doi:10.1073/pnas.30.9.244. PMC 1078704. PMID 16588651.

== See also ==
- Acoustoelastic effect
- Kronecker coefficient
- Murnaghan–Nakayama rule
- Murnaghan–Tait equation of state
