= Francis Dominic Murnaghan Jr. =

American judge (1920–2000)

Judge of the United States Court of Appeals for the Fourth Circuit
- In office July 13, 1979 – August 31, 2000
- Appointed by: Jimmy Carter
- Preceded by: Seat established by 92 Stat. 1629
- Succeeded by: Andre M. Davis

Personal details
- Born: Francis Dominic Murnaghan Jr. June 20, 1920 Baltimore, Maryland
- Died: August 31, 2000 (aged 80) Baltimore, Maryland
- Parent: Francis Dominic Murnaghan (father)
- Education: Johns Hopkins University (AB); Harvard Law School (LLB)

Francis Dominic Murnaghan Jr. (June 20, 1920 – August 31, 2000) was a United States circuit judge of the United States Court of Appeals for the Fourth Circuit.

== Education and career ==
Born in Baltimore, Maryland, Murnaghan received an Artium Baccalaureus degree from Johns Hopkins University in 1941 and was a United States Naval Reserve Lieutenant during World War II, from 1942 to 1946. He received a Bachelor of Laws from Harvard Law School in 1948. He was in private practice in Philadelphia, Pennsylvania from 1948 to 1950. He was a staff attorney of the United States Department of State High Commission on Germany in Frankfurt, West Germany from 1950 to 1952. He was an assistant state attorney general of Maryland from 1952 to 1954. He was in private practice in Baltimore from 1954 to 1979.

== Federal judicial service ==
Murnaghan was nominated by President Jimmy Carter on May 8, 1979, to the United States Court of Appeals for the Fourth Circuit, to a new seat created by 92 Stat. 1629. He was confirmed by the United States Senate on July 12, 1979, and received his commission on July 13, 1979. Murnaghan served in that capacity until his death on August 31, 2000, in Baltimore.

== Personal life ==
Murnaghan's father was Francis Dominic Murnaghan, a mathematician.

== Sources ==
Legal offices
Preceded by Seat established by 92 Stat. 1629	Judge of the United States Court of Appeals for the Fourth Circuit; 1979–2000	Succeeded by Andre M. Davis
