= Birch–Murnaghan equation of state =

Equation in mechanics

The Birch–Murnaghan isothermal equation of state, published in 1947 by Albert Francis Birch of Harvard, is a relationship between the volume of a body and the pressure to which it is subjected. Birch proposed this equation based on the work of Francis Dominic Murnaghan of Johns Hopkins University published in 1944, so that the equation is named in honor of both scientists.

== Expressions for the equation of state ==
The third-order Birch–Murnaghan isothermal equation of state is given by
$$P(V)=\frac{3B_0}{2}
\left[\left(\frac{V_0}{V}\right)^{7/3} -
\left(\frac{V_0}{V}\right)^{5/3}\right]
\left\{1+\frac{3}{4}\left(B_0^\prime-4\right)
\left[\left(\frac{V_0}{V}\right)^{2/3} - 1\right]\right\}.$$
where P is the pressure, V_{0} is the reference volume, V is the deformed volume, B_{0} is the bulk modulus, and B_{0}' is the derivative of the bulk modulus with respect to pressure. The bulk modulus and its derivative are usually obtained from fits to experimental data and are defined as
$$B_0 = -V \left(\frac{\partial P}{\partial V}\right)_{P = 0}$$
and
$$B_0' = \left(\frac{\partial B}{\partial P}\right)_{P = 0}$$
The expression for the equation of state is obtained by expanding the Helmholtz free energy in powers of the finite strain parameter f, defined as
$$f = \frac{1}{2}\left[\left(\frac{V_0}{V}\right)^{{2/3}} - 1\right] \,,$$
in the form of a series. This is more evident by writing the equation in terms of f. Expanded to third order in finite strain, the equation reads,
$$P(f) = 3 B_0 f (1 + 2 f)^{5/2} ( 1 + a f + \text{higher order terms})\,,$$
with $a = \frac{3}{2}(B_0' - 4)$.

The internal energy, E(V), is found by integration of the pressure:
$$E(V) = E_0 + \frac{9V_0B_0}{16}
\left\{
\left[\left(\frac{V_0}{V}\right)^{2/3} - 1\right]^3 B_0^\prime +
\left[\left(\frac{V_0}{V}\right)^{2/3} - 1\right]^2
\left[6-4\left(\frac{V_0}{V}\right)^{2/3}\right]\right\}.$$

== See also ==
- Albert Francis Birch
- Francis Dominic Murnaghan
- Murnaghan equation of state
