= List of first women lawyers and judges in Maryland =

This is a list of the first women lawyer(s) and judge(s) in Maryland. It includes the year in which the women were admitted to practice law (in parentheses). Also included are women who achieved other distinctions such becoming the first in their state to graduate from law school or become a political figure.

== Firsts in state history ==
=== Lawyers ===
- First female: Etta Haynie Maddox (1902)
  - Anna Grace Kennedy (1906)
  - Emilie Doetsch (1907)
  - Marie Elizabeth Kirk Coles (1907)
  - Mary Virginia Meushaw (1909)
  - Helen F. Hill (1912)
  - Emily Dashiell (1918)
- First Jewish American female (and 8th female): Grace Rebecca Gerber Silverberg (1920)
- First African American female: Jane Cleo Marshall Lucas (1946)
- First African American female (actively practice): Juanita Jackson Mitchell (1950)

=== State judges ===
- First female: Kathryn J. DuFour (1935) in 1955
- First female (Maryland Special Court of Appeals): Rita Charmatz Davidson (1963) in 1972
- First female (Maryland Court of Appeals): Rita Charmatz Davidson (1963) in 1979
- First African American female: Mabel H. Hubbard (1975) in 1985
- First Hispanic American (female): Audrey J.S. Carrion in 1995
- First female (chief judge): Martha F. Rasin in 1996
- First Muslim American female (preside over court): Zakia Mahasa in 1997
- First Korean American female: Jeannie Hong (1993) in 2002
- First openly LGBT (female): Halee F. Weinstein in 2002
- First female (juvenile court): Bess B. Lavine
- First African American female (Maryland Special Court of Appeals): Michele D. Hotten in 2010
- First African-American female (Maryland Court of Appeals): Shirley M. Watts (1983) in 2013
- First Asian American (female) (Maryland Special Court of Appeals): Rosalyn Tang in 2022
- First Latino American (female) (Maryland Court of Appeals): Angela Eaves in 2022

=== Federal judges ===
- First female (United States District Court for the District of Maryland): Shirley Brannock Jones (1946) in 1979
- First female of color (African-American/Native American; United States District Court for the District of Maryland): Lydia Kay Griggsby in 2021

=== Deputy Attorney General ===
- First female: Eleanor Carey in 1984

=== Associate Attorney General ===
- First female: Eleanor Carey in 1979

=== Assistant Attorney General ===
- First female: Shirley Brannock Jones (1946)

=== United States Attorney ===
- First female: Catherine C. Blake in 2009

=== State's Attorney ===
- First African American female: Toni E. Clarke from 1994 to 1995

=== District Attorney ===
- First female: Susie Starp around 1974

=== Public Defender ===
- First African American (female): Natasha Dartigue

=== Political Office ===
- First African American (female) (Senator-elect): Angela Alsobrooks in 2024

=== Maryland State Bar Association ===
- First female admitted: Rose Zetzer (1946)
- First female president: Louise Michaux Gonzales in 1991

== Firsts in local history ==
- Alice C. Taylor: First female magistrate in Southern Maryland (1965)
- Elizabeth Morris: First African American female circuit judge in Anne Arundel County, Maryland (2018)
- Anne Colt Leitess: First female to serve as the State's Attorney for Anne Arundel County, Maryland (2018)
- Juanita Jackson Mitchell and Elaine Carsley Davis: First African American females to graduate from the Maryland School of Law (1950)
- Edna Horak: First female Justice of the Peace in Baltimore, Maryland (1924)
- Patricia C. Jessamy: First female to serve as the State's Attorney for Baltimore, Maryland (1995)
- Audrey J.S. Carrion: First Hispanic American (female) to serve as a Judge of the Circuit Court for Baltimore City, Maryland (1995)
- Phoebe A. Haddon: First African American (female) to serve as the Dean of the University of Maryland Francis King Carey School of Law (2009)
- Jeanette Rosner Wolman (1957): First female lawyer admitted to the Bar Association of Baltimore City [Baltimore County, Maryland]
- Wanda Keyes Heard (1982): First female (and African American female) appointed as the Chief Judge of the Baltimore City Circuit Court (2017) [Baltimore City, Maryland]
- Ebony M. Thompson: First (openly lesbian) female to serve as the City Solicitor of Baltimore City, Maryland (2024)
- JoAnn Ellinghaus-Jones (1981): First female judge in Carroll County, Maryland
- Maria Oesterreicher: First female to become a Judge of the Circuit Court in Carroll County, Maryland (2018)
- Bonnie G. Schneider (1988): First female judge in Cecil County, Maryland
- Donine Carrington (1995): First African American female to serve on the Charles County Circuit Court (2017) [Charles County, Maryland]
- Betty Bright Nelson (c. 1950s): First woman to practice law in Dorchester County, Maryland
- Mary Ann Stepler (1974): First female judge in Frederick County, Maryland
- Yolanda L. Curtin: First Latino female to serve on the Harford County Circuit Court, Maryland (2013)
- Diane O. Leasure and Donna Hill Staton: First females to serve as a Judge of the Howard County Circuit Court in Maryland (1995). Staton is the first African American (female) judge appointed to the circuit court.
- Alice Gail Pollard Clark: First African American (female) to serve as district judge for Howard County, Maryland (1997)
- Vivian V. Simpson (c. 1930s): First female lawyer in Montgomery County, Maryland
- Irma S. Raker: First African American female to serve as the Assistant State's Attorney of Montgomery County, Maryland
- Marielsa A. Bernard (1981): First Hispanic American female to serve as a district court judge (1998) and circuit court judge (2002) in Montgomery County, Maryland
- Sharon V. Burrell (1984): First African American female to serve on the Montgomery County Circuit Court (c. 2008) [Montgomery County, Maryland]
- Karla Smith (1995): First African American female to serve on the Montgomery County District Court (2012) [Montgomery County, Maryland]
- Toni E. Clarke: First African-American female to serve as the State's Attorney for Prince George's County, Maryland (1994-1995). She was the first African-American (female) to serve as the President of the Prince George's County Bar Association.
- Carmen D. Tidler: First Hispanic American female to serve as the Assistant State’s Attorney for Prince George’s County, Maryland
- Jacqueline Byrd-Tillman: First African American female to serve as the Assistant State’s Attorney for Prince George’s County, Maryland
- Angela Alsobrooks: First African American female elected to serve as the State's Attorney for Prince George's County, Maryland (2010)
- Gladys Weatherspoon: First Latino American female (who is of Dominican descent) judge in Prince George's County, Maryland (2020)
- Llamilet Gutierrez: First Hispanic American (female) to serve as a Judge of Prince George’s County District Court (2023)
- Gina Circincion: First female to serve as the State's Attorney for Washington County, Maryland (2022)
- Grace Gerber (1920): First female (and Jewish American female) lawyer in Hagerstown, Maryland [Washington County, Maryland]
- Sally D. Adkins: First female to serve as a Judge of the Wicomico County Circuit Court (1996)
- Peggy Kent (c. 1980): First female judge in Worcester County (2018)
- Kris Heiser: First female to serve as the State's Attorney for Worcester County (2019)

== See also ==
- List of first women lawyers and judges in the United States
- Timeline of women lawyers in the United States
- Women in law

== Other topics of interest ==
- List of first minority male lawyers and judges in the United States
- List of first minority male lawyers and judges in Maryland
