= Justice and Jurisprudence =

1889 book

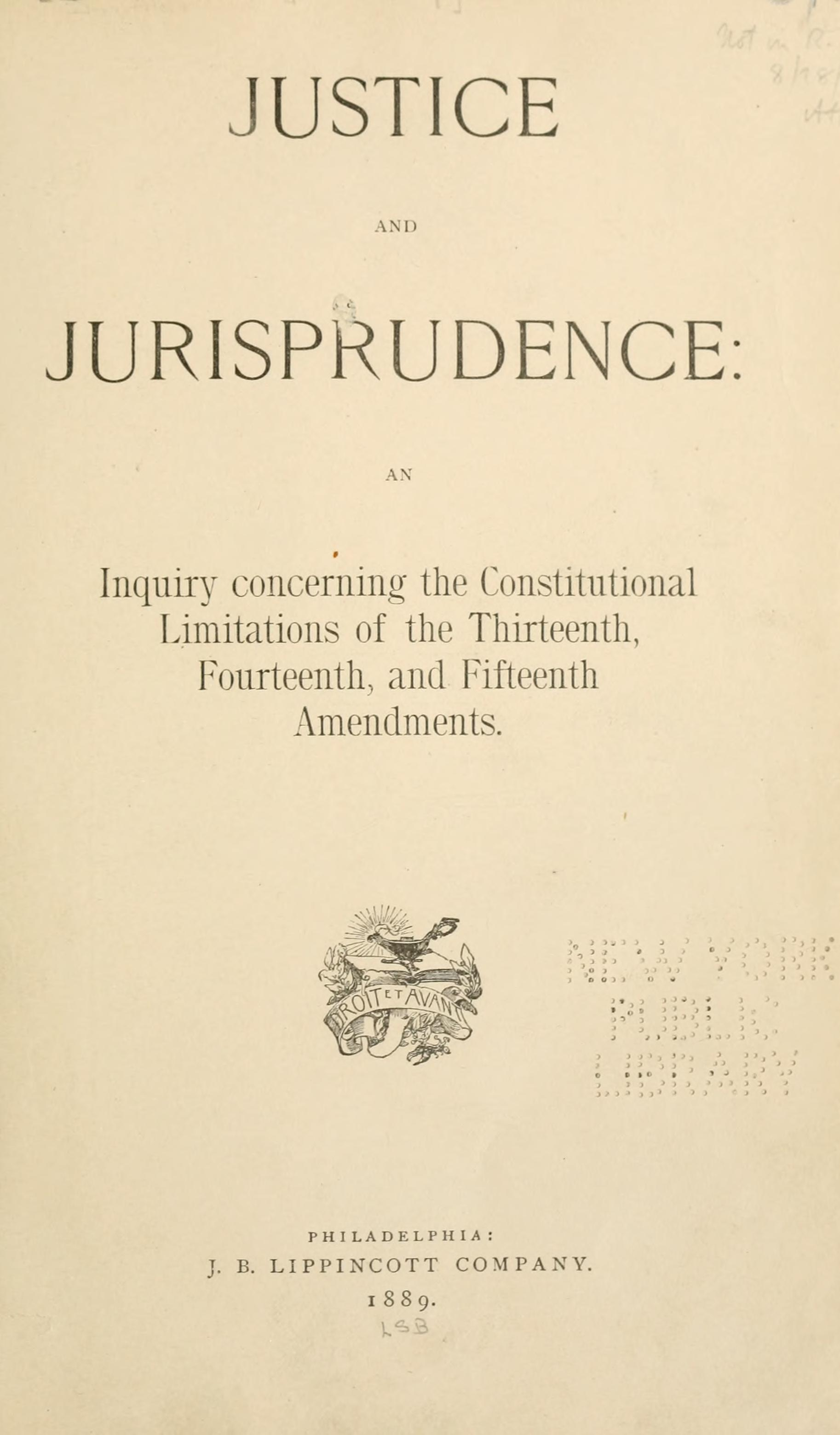
- Cover page of the first edition, 1889
- Author: Anonymous (affiliated with the Brotherhood of Liberty)
- Published: 1889 (J. B. Lippincott & Co.)

Justice and Jurisprudence is a book that was first published in 1889 by the Brotherhood of Liberty. It was a critique of rulings of the Supreme Court of the United States on the Reconstruction Amendments. The book is "the first known comprehensive book on jurisprudence written by blacks" and serves as a valuable source of information on African Americans' legal opinions in the late 19th century.

== Background ==
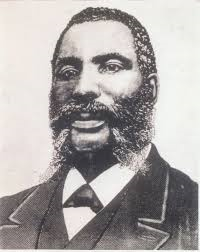
Harvey Johnson

After passing a bar exam in Maine in 1844, Macon Bolling Allen became the first African American lawyer in the United States. In 1865, John Swett Rock became the first Black person to be admitted to the bar of the Supreme Court of the United States. Partly in response to Black people being restricted from entering the Maryland Bar, a group known as the Brotherhood of Liberty was formed in Baltimore on June 2, 1885. That same year, Everett J. Waring was admitted to the bar and that portion of the Brotherhood's goal was reached. However, the group stayed active with the goal to fight "against denial of liberty according to race," and to "use all legal means within [their] power to procure and maintain [their] rights as citizens of [their] common country." A year later Waring wrote "The Judicial Function in Government", which was published in The A.M.E. Church Review. The article "expressed skepticism about the judicial power exercised in Dred Scott v. Sandford because such judicial power had ordained white power as superior ..."

=== Authorship and publication ===
In 1889, the Brotherhood of Liberty wrote Justice and Jurisprudence: An Inquiry Concerning the Constitutional Limitations of the Thirteenth, Fourteenth and Fifteenth Amendments. The book, which is 578 pages long, was published by J. B. Lippincott & Co. and sold for $3.00. Harvey Johnson, a reverend in Baltimore, felt that the book could influence racial thinking.

Although the book is listed as having been written only by Brotherhood of Liberty, the scholar Elaine K. Freeman argues that John Henry Keene, a white lawyer, actually wrote the vast majority of the book; Freeman attributes only its first 43 pages to the Brotherhood and argues that they were written by Harvey Johnson. Mark Weiner concurs with Freeman, attributing most of the work to Keene. J. Smith disagrees, writing in the Notre Dame Law Review that Waring likely "played a key role" in writing the book and speculating that contemporary Black lawyers including William E. Matthews, John H. Butler, Joseph F. Davis, and William Henry Richardson were involved. A near-contemporary biographical encyclopedia, in a profile of Keene, attributes Justice and Jurisprudence to him.

== Content ==
[Justice and Jurisprudence has two main parts] The first concerns the Positive Law of the Fourteenth Amendment, by which the whole power of the American state is pledged to maintain the equality of civil rights of every American citizen by Due Process of Law. The second discloses the transparent veils of legal fiction under cover of which the civil rights of all races are being slowly undermined.

— "Preface" to Justice and Jurisprudence (1889), p. i.

The book called for a "sober investigation and dissection of the decisions of our courts which have produced or suffered the present obscuration of the great political truths of the Fourteenth Amendment." It argued that Black people should be considered prima facie citizens of the US as long as they were born in the country; that civic life "should be free, easy, elastic, and natural"; and advocated for jurisprudence that would be fair to Black citizens.

Justice and Jurisprudence began with a preface and the bulk of its content was 46 chapters that condemned decisions of the United States Supreme Court such as the Civil Rights Cases, which the Brotherhood argued misinterpreted the Reconstruction Amendments. The book further maintained that the Court "ignored precedent, manipulated language to justify outcomes, and founded decisions on prejudice and policies instead of higher law and the forward march of morality."

A contemporary review outlined the work's style and content as follows:

... the main work commences after the style of the Doctor and Student. The constitutional, religious, sociological and economic discussion follows between the foreign publicist, who "has never felt the chill blasts of racial adversity," the Chief Justice of the Supreme Court and Leaders of the Press. This colloquial discourse closes with an understanding between them that the foreign publicist is to present to the American Public a review of the legal status of civil right in America as it appears to the unbiased judgment of a foreigner ... The author seems not at all embarrassed in his great undertaking to demonstrate that Supreme Court decisions of late, construing the Fourteenth Amendment, have been characterized by a narrow spirit, which defeats the noble purpose of its framers, and has given rise indirectly to the race controversies which now agitate the country.

According to Mark Weiner, Justice and Jurisprudence argues that the ideas expressed in the United States Declaration of Independence are legally binding on governments. Against prevailing legal theories, Weiner argues, the work posits a "jurisprudence of Christianity and liberal universalism".

== Reception and impact ==
Upon publication, the book was reviewed several times, including by The New York Times and Thaddeus B. Wakeman in Science. A review in The American Catholic Quarterly Review criticized the book's anonymous publication, saying that "the literary style is good enough for the author not to be ashamed of it" and felt its anonymity detracted from its effectiveness. It concluded that "we cannot but express our admiration for the work as a whole. It is a very valuable addition to our historical literature, and throws a flood of light on the position of the colored elements of our population." An anonymous reviewer in The Philadelphia Inquirer, describing it as "an inquiry concerning the constitutional limitations of the Thirteenth, Fourteenth and Fifteenth Amendments", suggested that Justice and Jurisprudence represented a "return to the pamphlet which preceded newspapers and now shows some signs of being revived". The review further argued that the Justice and Jurisprudence was best understood as an argument against the decision in Hall v. DeCuir, a 1878 United States Supreme Court case in which Josephine DeCuir, a Black woman, unsuccessfully sued the operator of a steamboat on which she had been refused access to the women's cabin.

The book is "the first known comprehensive book on jurisprudence written by blacks". It is a valuable source for the legal opinions of African Americans in the late 19th century. In an interview with The New Yorker in 2019, the historian Eric Foner described Justice and Jurisprudence as "a powerful critique of how the Supreme Court had really missed the point, in many ways, of the Thirteenth, Fourteenth, and Fifteenth Amendments" and in a 2019 op-ed published in The New York Times he wrote that it was "the first sustained critique of Supreme Court rulings construing the amendments." Smith concluded that the book's "origination stands as the Magna Carta of black people, and its powerful themes now grace the matrix of American law."

== Bibliography ==
- Brotherhood of Liberty (1889). Justice and Jurisprudence: An Inquiry Concerning the Constitutional Limitations of the Thirteenth, Fourteenth, and Fifteenth Amendments. Philadelphia: J.B. Lippincott. OCLC 18110316.
- Lado, Marianne (April 1, 1995). "A Question of Justice: African-American Legal Perspectives on the 1883 Civil Rights Cases". Chicago-Kent Law Review. 70 (3): 1123. ISSN 0009-3599.
- Smith, J. Clay (March 14, 2014). "Justice and Jurisprudence and the Black Lawyer". Notre Dame Law Review. 69 (5): 1077. ISSN 0745-3515.
- Wakeman, T. B. (January 10, 1890). "Justice and Jurisprudence: an Inquiry concerning the Constitutional Limitations of the Thirteenth, Fourteenth, and Fifteenth Amendments. Philadelphia, Lippincott. ‡ $3". Science. New series. 15 (362): 26–27. doi:10.1126/science.ns-15.362.26. ISSN 0036-8075.
- Weiner, Mark Stuart (2004). Black Trials: Citizenship from the Beginnings of Slavery to the End of Caste. Alfred A. Knopf. ISBN 0-375-40981-5. OCLC 54529147.
