= Francis M. Wood =

American educator and school administrator

- Born: 1878; Glasgow, Kentucky, U.S.
- Died: May 8, 1943; Baltimore, Maryland, U.S.
- Education: Kentucky State Normal School (BA); Eckstein Norton University (MA); Morgan College (PhD, Hon.)
- Organization: Baltimore City Public Schools
- Office: Director of Negro Schools
- Term: 1925-1943
- Successor: Elmer A. Henderson
- Spouse: Nellie V. Wood
- Children: 4

Francis Marion Wood (1878 – May 8, 1943) was an American educator and school administrator. Born and educated in Kentucky, Wood achieved his greatest prominence as the director of Negro schools for Baltimore City Public Schools, a role that he held for 18 years, from 1925 until his death.

Beyond his role with Baltimore schools, Wood was an active leader in several state and nationwide educational and civil rights organizations. At the time of his death, Wood was recognized as a "nationally-known Negro educator."

== Education and early career ==
Wood was born in Glasgow, Kentucky. He was a graduate of Glasgow High School and the State Normal School (now Kentucky State University) in Frankfort, Kentucky. He received diplomas from both the agricultural and academic departments. He received his Master of Arts degree at Eckstein Norton University in Cane Spring, Kentucky in 1906.

Wood began his career with a variety of different positions in Kentucky education. Wood first worked as a teacher in a one-room log schoolhouse, and continued teaching in rural Kentucky schools from 1896 to 1899. Wood next taught at Kentucky's State Normal School from 1901 to 1907. He then served as a principal of black elementary and high schools in Kentucky for the next three years. This was followed by a promotion to serve as the State Supervisor of black high schools and rural schools in the state in 1922 and 1923. Wood then served as the president of the Colored State Normal School (now Kentucky State University) at Frankfort in 1924.

During his tenure, Wood was also the president of Kentucky Negro Teachers' Association, and a member of the Kentucky Commission on Interracial Cooperation. Later in 1924, Wood was also the Rockefeller Foundation student at the Hampton Normal and Agricultural Institute (now Hampton University) in Hampton, Virginia.

== Work for Baltimore City Schools ==
Arguing that he was "untrammeled by local prejudice," Baltimore City Schools hired Wood from outside the state to serve as their Supervisor of Colored Schools beginning August 1, 1925, with a salary of $4,200 (equivalent to $77,106 in 2025). In 1927, Wood was reclassified as "Director of Negro Schools," with a commensurate salary increase. At this time, he moved his offices into the new location of the black teacher training school, Coppin Normal School, (now Coppin State University) when it relocated to Lafayette Avenue and McCulloh Streets. In 1928, Wood was briefly investigated by the School Board due to allegations he was being financially influenced by a local black leader, Tom Smith, but the two men were exonerated. According to newspaper reports however, this investigation did reveal that Dr. Wood was "regarded as an outsider" by some city residents, who sought his removal in favor of a black educator born in the city.

During his tenure, black enrollment in Baltimore City schools nearly doubled. Wood advocated for additional school facilities to support that greater enrollment. Wood oversaw the dedications of major black schools in Baltimore including Samuel Coleridge Taylor Elementary and an expanded campus for Frederick Douglas High School. Wood was also responsible for selecting names for many of the city's black schools, which had heretofore been identified only by their school number. He selected namesakes (both white and black) who had positively impacted the black community, including Harriet Tubman, Wendell Phillips, Harriet Beecher Stowe, Harvey Johnson and Frances Harper.

Despite his prestige and length of service in the city, a 1941 article in the Baltimore Sun described how, when the school board met, Wood, who was considered of lower rank, was required to be seated in the rear of the room, separate from the other school executives. The next year, citing both "the justice of the request" and Wood's "excellent service" to the city's schools, the executive secretary of the city's Public School Association, Marie Bauernschmidt put forward the proposal that Wood be promoted to the equal status of assistant superintendent. These requests for Wood's promotion were however "consistently refused" by the city's all-white school board.

== Other activities ==
In 1929, Wood assisted in the organization of the "first Negro symphony in the United States," which was formed and put on its first concert in Baltimore.

Wood received an honorary doctorate in pedagogy from Morgan State College in 1931. In 1933, Wood was elected president of the National Association of Teachers in Colored Schools.

In response to a 1934 lynching in Somerset County, Maryland, Wood worked with the Urban League and other black leaders in Baltimore to draft a resolution calling on Governor Albert Ritchie to pass an anti-lynching statute. Later in the same year, Wood was selected by the new Republican governor-elect Harry Nice to serve on the Maryland Commission of Higher Education of Negroes, which was tasked to determine whether the HBCU Morgan College should be taken over by the State of Maryland. The commission released its report five years later, in 1939, recommending that the state purchase Morgan. Wood was also a member of the commission's subcommittee on awards, which was charged with awarding scholarships to colleges and universities for black students. Governor Nice would also later appoint to Wood on the State Highway Safety Group.

In 1939, Wood served as one faculty member for the Baltimore Police Training School, a free program which sought to prepare black candidates for the Baltimore City Police entrance examinations.

During World War II, Wood supported the American war effort against Japan and Germany, and advised his fellow black Americans not to "unduly press for advantages" during wartime.

== Death and legacy ==
In May 1943, Wood was hospitalized for a heart condition, aggravated by a recent flu. He died several weeks later at Johns Hopkins Hospital, on the night of May 8. His funeral services were held at Union Baptist Church in Baltimore. The funeral service was attended by about 650 people, and was accompanied by a five-minute period of silence at all city schools, with flags flown at half-mast.

Following his death, Wood was succeeded as Director of Colored Schools by Elmer A. Henderson, then the principal of Booker T. Washington Junior High School. While Wood had been unable to achieve an equal title of assistant superintendent during his life, his successor Henderson finally was granted that position in 1945.

"Camp Francis M. Wood" was a summer camp for Baltimore City youth from low income families which existed along Bunker Hill Road in Baltimore County into the 1950s. Initially, the site was a camp operated by a private group headed by Wood himself, but it was purchased by Baltimore City Department of Public Welfare after his death and reopened in his honor.

Several different schools in Baltimore have borne Wood's name. Immediately following his death, the "Francis M. Wood School for colored handicapped children" was founded. The present-day Excel Academy at Francis M. Wood High School, an Alternative High School is the most recent iteration.
