= Laurel Cemetery =

Defunct cemetery in Maryland, U.S.

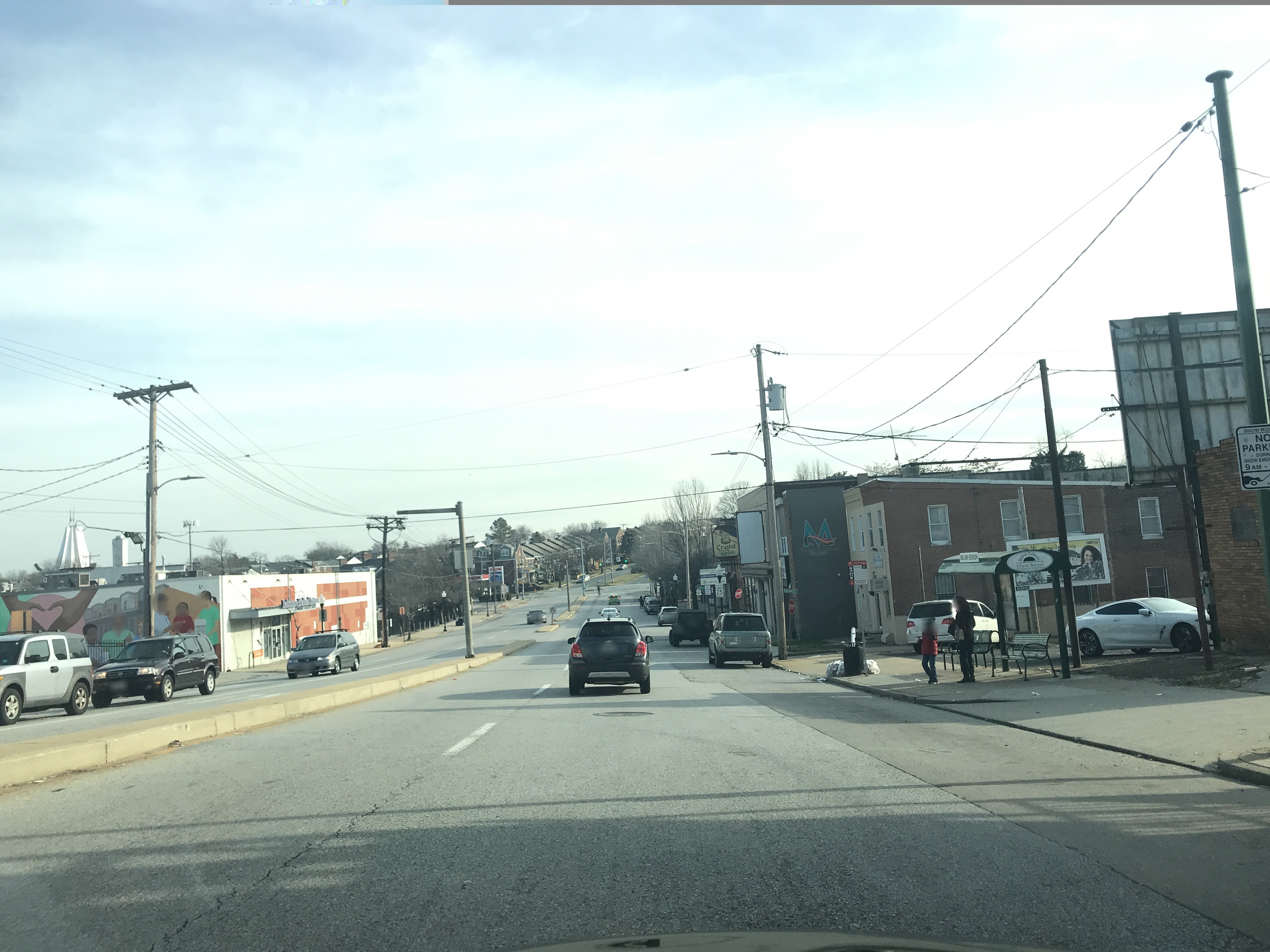
- Cross streets of Erdman Avenue & Belair Road across from the shopping center that now occupies the site of the historic cemetery.
- Interactive map of Laurel Cemetery

Details
- Established: November 19, 1851
- Closed: 1958
- Location: 2401 Belair Rd, Baltimore, MD 21213
- Country: United States
- Coordinates: 39°19′06″N 76°34′33″W
- Type: African-American nondenominational
- No. of graves: 40,000+
- Find a Grave: Laurel Cemetery

Laurel Cemetery was a former African-American cemetery in Baltimore, Maryland. For over one hundred years, the cemetery became the final resting place of thousands of citizens from Maryland's African-American community. After falling into disrepair, the cemetery land was purchased by developers and a shopping center was built overtop. The site has been listed on the National Register of Historic Places.

== History ==
In 1851, land was purchased from Thomas Burgan Jr. for use as a cemetery. Laurel Cemetery was incorporated shortly thereafter as the first nondenominational cemetery for African-Americans in Baltimore. By 1881, the cemetery covered 28 acres. That year, the cemetery was badly damaged when a cyclone hit Baltimore during the 1881 Atlantic hurricane season.

Throughout the 1880s, the cemetery was the site of a series of notable grave-robbing incidents conducted by several of the cemetery's grave diggers. By the 1920s, the cemetery began to fall into disrepair. In 1958, the site was purchased by a developer despite objections from the community. When developers bought the site, the remains of the cemetery's residents were to be moved. Later research found that developers largely did not comply with requirements to relocate the remains. It is estimated that the remains of between 18,000 and 40,000 internments at Laurel Cemetery remain under the Belair Edison Crossing Shopping center that now occupies the site.

=== Laurel Cemetery Project ===
In 2014, professors from the University of Baltimore and Coppin State University created the Laurel Cemetery Project to teach students about cultural resource management, history, archaeology, and environmental sustainability by undertaking work at the site. Anthropologists undertaking work at the site, have since discovered human remains, headstones and other funerary materials on the site of the former cemetery.

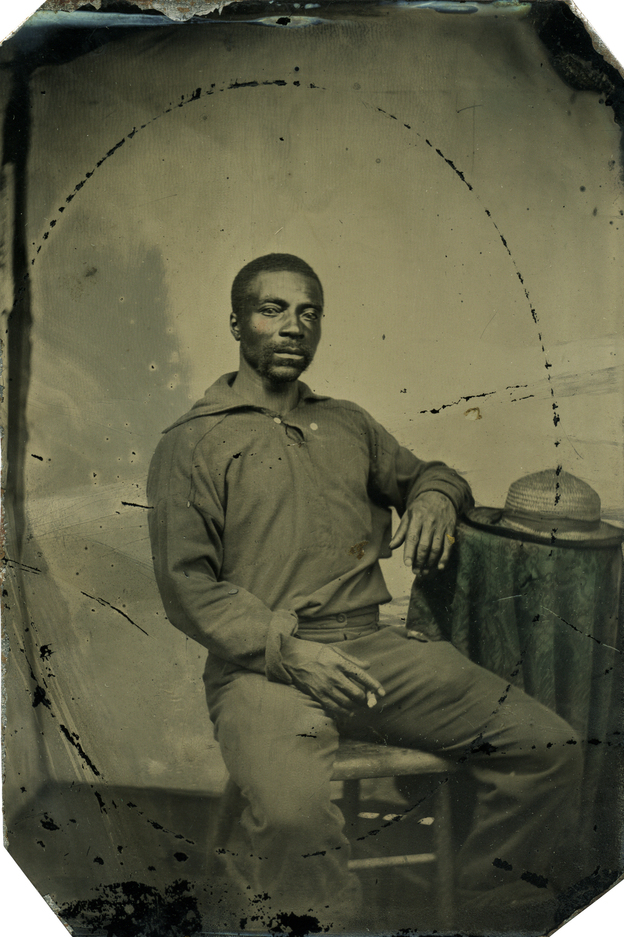
George William Commodore, born free in Baltimore in 1825, served in the US Navy during the American Civil War and interred in Laurel Cemetery in 1885

== Notable internments ==
- Reverend Alexander Walker Wayman, (1821–1895) Preacher and bishop
- Amelia E. Johnson, (1858 –1922) Canadian writer and poet
- Daniel Payne, (1811–1893) American bishop, educator, college administrator and author
- Harvey Johnson, (1843 –1923) pastor, activist, and leader of the Union Baptist Church
- George William Commodore, (1925–1885) US Navy sailor, served in the Potomac Flotilla aboard the USS Adolph Hugel
- Margaret Jane Blake, (1811–1880) formerly enslaved woman and later subject of biographical narrative
- Mary Ella Mossell, (1853–1886) American African Methodist Episcopal missionary in Haiti
- "Big Winnie" Johnson (1839–1888) American "Fat Lady" sideshow performer
- Isaac Myers, (1835–1891) pioneering trade unionist, co-operative organizer and caulker
- Dr. Thomas A. Killion, (died 1903) African-American physician and father of Adah Jenkins
- Hiram T. Watty, (1844–1905) member of the Baltimore City Council from 1899 to 1905
- Frederick B. McGinnis, (d. 1896) personal servant to P.G.T. Beauregard and Jefferson Davis
- Eliza Blackstone, (1782–1904) professed supercentarian of 122 years old
- Reverend William H.B. Vodery, (d. 1884) professor of ancient languages at Lincoln University, father of Will Vodery
- Lucy Welsh (d. 1903) dime museum "Fat Lady"
- Captain Edward J. Wheatley, (d. 1896) shipowner and sailor, first colored man to own an excursion resort in Maryland, Galesville Beach

=== United States Colored Troops ===
229 soldiers from the United States Colored Troops were buried at Laurel Cemetery. These remains were later interred in the new national cemetery at Loudon Park. They included:

- Samuel Simon, Company A 125th Infantry, New Jersey, September 19, 1865
- Daniel Williams, Company E 43rd Infantry, New Jersey, May 5, 1864

== See also ==
- Columbian Harmony Cemetery, a Washington, DC historic African-American cemetery that suffered the same fate at nearly the same point in time
