= Ada King =

Ada King may refer to:

- Ada Lovelace (1815–1852), English mathematician and writer, married name King
- Ada Copeland King (1860–1964), common-law wife of the American geologist Clarence King
