= Justice Watts =

Justice Watts may refer to:

- Joseph M. Watt (born 1947), associate justice of the Oklahoma Supreme Court
- Richard C. Watts (1853–1930), associate justice of the South Carolina Supreme Court
- Shirley M. Watts (born 1959), judge of the Maryland Court of Appeals
