= Everett J. Waring =

American lawyer

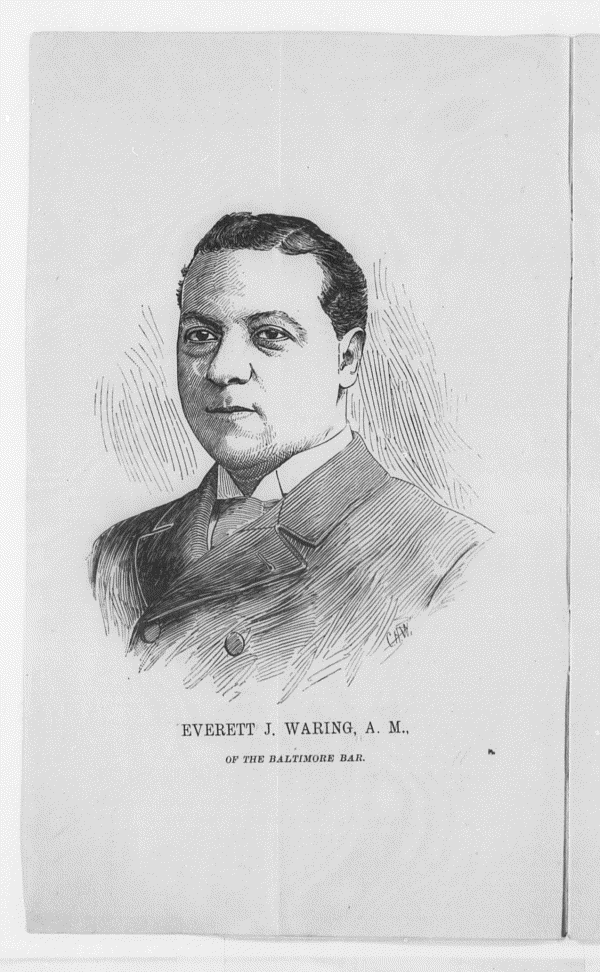
- Born: May 22, 1859
- Died: September 2, 1914 (aged 55) (Note: Waring is also said to have died in the year 1915, but public records show that he died on September 2, 1914.)
- Occupations: Attorney, banker

Everett J. Waring (May 22, 1859 – September 2, 1914) was the first African-American person admitted to the Maryland State Bar Association in 1885 and the Supreme Court Bench of Baltimore on October 10, 1885. He practiced before the Supreme Court of the United States and the Maryland State Appellate Court.

Representing the African American men who violently rebelled against inhumane treatment, low pay, and high costs after being lured to mine guano on Navassa Island, Waring was the first African American lawyer to argue before the Supreme Court in Jones v. United States (1890), ultimately losing the case.

Waring represented the Brotherhood of Liberty. He was cofounder of the Lexington Savings Bank in 1895, a black-owned business. Waring had legal and financial troubles that led to the bank failing and equity cases filed against Waring for unpaid mortgages. As a result, he left Baltimore and returned to Ohio where he established a law practice. He later moved to Philadelphia, where he practiced law. Over his career, he was a newspaper editor and publisher as well as an African Methodist Episcopal Church minister.

== Early life ==
The son of Malvina C. (Note: Her name is also said to be Malvina C. Waring and to have come from Fredericksburg, Virginia from a "prominent family of colored farmers". By 1880, she was known as Malvina Waring, and was a widow. Everett was the eldest child, followed by Adella, Mina, Clarence and Nora.) and James S. Waring, Everett was born in Springfield, Ohio, on May 22, 1859. Malvina was born c. 1838 in Pennsylvania. James, born c. 1828 in Virginia, (Note: James was purported to have descended from Arrica Vessels, and her enslaver, Captain William Waring, who was from Essex County, Virginia.) was an educator and principal of African American schools in Columbus and Springfield. Everett, whose mother and father were mulatto, was described as "very light-colored". His parents, who were second cousins, were married in Oberlin, Ohio c. 1857. James died May 15, 1878, in Columbus, Ohio.

James Stapleton Waring and Malvina Waring had five children: Everett, Clarence, Addie, Ovella, and Nora May. Clarence, later known as Dr. C.C. Waring, lived in Washington, D.C., as an adult.

== Education and early career ==
Waring graduated from Columbus High School in 1877, after which he taught in Columbus and Springfield public schools. One year later, he became a principal of colored schools in Columbus. After white and colored schools were integrated in 1882, he was appointed by Senator John Sherman that year as an examiner of pensions at the Department of Interior in Washington, D.C. He held the position during the period he studied at Howard Law School. Waring graduated with honor from Howard Law School in 1885. He received a Master's Degree in 1893.

== Career ==
First admitted to the bar in Washington, D.C., in 1885, Waring began practicing law in D.C. He moved to Baltimore in 1886 at the encouragement of Rev. Harvey Johnson to become the first black lawyer in the state and to represent the Brotherhood of Liberty to fight for rights of colored people. For instance, he sought to extend the state's Bastardy Act to include colored women as well as white women, which meant that unmarried colored women would have a legal right to financial assistance from their children's father. Although Clay did not officially win the case, the following year "white" was removed from the act so that the law was not limited to white women only. He established a law office on Courtland Street, where he served members of the African American community. He was admitted to the Maryland Court of Appeals in Annapolis in 1887.

He and fellow Howard alumni Joseph S. Davis represented three African American men, including Henry Jones, of the Navassa Island riot of 1889. The riot, by guano miners who worked for the Quaker Company on the uninhabited Navassa Island, resulted in the death of five officers. The riot ensued after African American men were lured to the island to mine guano deposits and then were subject to mistreatment and low pay.

The laborers, many from Baltimore, were wooed by a phosphate company to the island of Navassa to mine guano, seabird waste used as fertilizer. The workers say they were greeted with "literal slavery. [They] were shackled and beaten and forbidden to leave the island," according to a 1933 AFRO news story summarizing the case. The company also inflated charges for food and other necessities, leaving the workers in debt.

— Stephanie Cornish, Maryland's First Black Lawyers

Jones and 17 other men were charged with murder and returned to the United States. After arguing the case in several courts, the Jones v. United States case went to the Supreme Court in 1890, where it was ruled that since the island was discovered by an American, U.S. courts had jurisdiction. Jones and two other men were found guilty of murder and sentenced to execution. Waring and other leaders persuaded President Benjamin Harrison to commute the sentence to life in prison. As the sole oral advocate, Waring was the first African American lawyer to argue before the United States Supreme Court.

Waring became a "prominent civic leader" in the African American community. In addition to his law practice, Waring was a co-founder of Lexington Savings Bank. Waring also invested in real estate. He owned up to forty houses, all of which were mortgaged. Equity cases were taken out in Baltimore City Circuit Court against Waring when his bank failed and mortgages for his houses had outstanding balances.

He edited newspapers in Ohio, Washington, D.C., and in Baltimore. In Springfield, he edited the Sunday Capital. He founded and published the Afro American newspaper in Columbus, Ohio.

In 1897, he became an ordained minister in the African Methodist Episcopal Church. The same year he returned to Columbus and established a law practice and later also accepted the position of acting police judge. He was admitted to the bar in Pennsylvania on December 15, 1904. He was a member of the Odd Fellows and Masonic orders.

== Legal issues ==
Waring was indicted by a grand jury for conspiracy to kidnap African American Mary Toomer in 1893. Also called Mamie, Toomer attended an orphan asylum and school in Baltimore for African American children following the death of her mother and remarriage of her father. Waring was among people from Baltimore and Augusta, Georgia, her hometown, who planned to free her in April 1892. Waring created a scheme in which two of the alleged kidnappers filed a suit against each other and needed Toomer as a witness. The plan fell through when the two men failed to appear before a justice. The purpose was to give Toomer, born in 1879, the means to run away from the school to be married to Charles Dickson, her step-brother. Toomer, though, said after the incident that she needed the consent of her father before she would leave the academy. Waring provided legal strategy and offered financial support for expenses. Waring and other co-defendants were found not guilty of the charge of conspiracy to kidnap in March 1895. He was fined $100 and costs for having been found guilty of conspiracy to abduct Miss Toomer.

In March 1897, the Lexington Savings Bank went into receivership and Waring was charged with embezzlement. Waring was acquitted of the charges. There was a marked loss, though, to the bank's customers and the reputation within the African American community. It was determined that Waring had used his personal money to try to save the bank, but he was unable to prevent the financial institution from failing.

== Personal life ==
Waring married Katie E. Johnson, daughter of Harry H. Johnson, a prominent Baltimore barber, on January 12, 1887. They had four children: Alice, Nora, Kate, and Walter. (Note: Their descendants include attorneys. Their great nephew Honorable Michael Waring Lee was the first African American to serve as chief judgeship in Maryland.) After moving to Baltimore, Waring joined the Union Baptist Church and later transferred to the St. John's African Methodist Episcopal Church. He moved to Ohio in 1897 in the midst of the embezzlement trial. Waring was distraught and an ill man due to the stress. He moved to Pennsylvania in his later years.

Waring died on September 2, 1914. (Note: The PA Bar Annual Report states that he died on September 3, 1914, but public records and his obituary state that he died on September 2, 1914.) Kate died in 1925. They are interred at the Eden Cemetery in Collingdale, Pennsylvania.

== Legacy ==
In 1922, Baltimore attorney William Ashbie Hawkins told the Baltimore Afro-American that Waring was “a brilliant advocate, but he was erratic. Had he been content to remain in the field of advocacy instead of trying to achieve wealth in real estate, for which he was illy fitted, he might have made a great career for himself, and saved his professional brethren, and his race several serious embarrassments."

The Everett J. Waring / Juanita Jackson Mitchell Law Society of Howard County ("WMLS") was chartered in Maryland on April 23, 1985, for judges, lawyers, and elected community leaders. It was named for Waring and Juanita Jackson Mitchell, both "outstanding African American attorneys of historical significance". It is affiliated with the state and national bar associations and is involved in community, legal, mentoring, judicial nominations and other key initiatives.

Warings is mentioned in a historic marker at the Union Baptist Church in Baltimore.

== See also ==
- Ada Copeland King, one of his clients
- List of first minority male lawyers and judges in Maryland
