= Harry A. Cole =

American lawyer and jurist (1921–1999)

Honorable Harry A. Cole
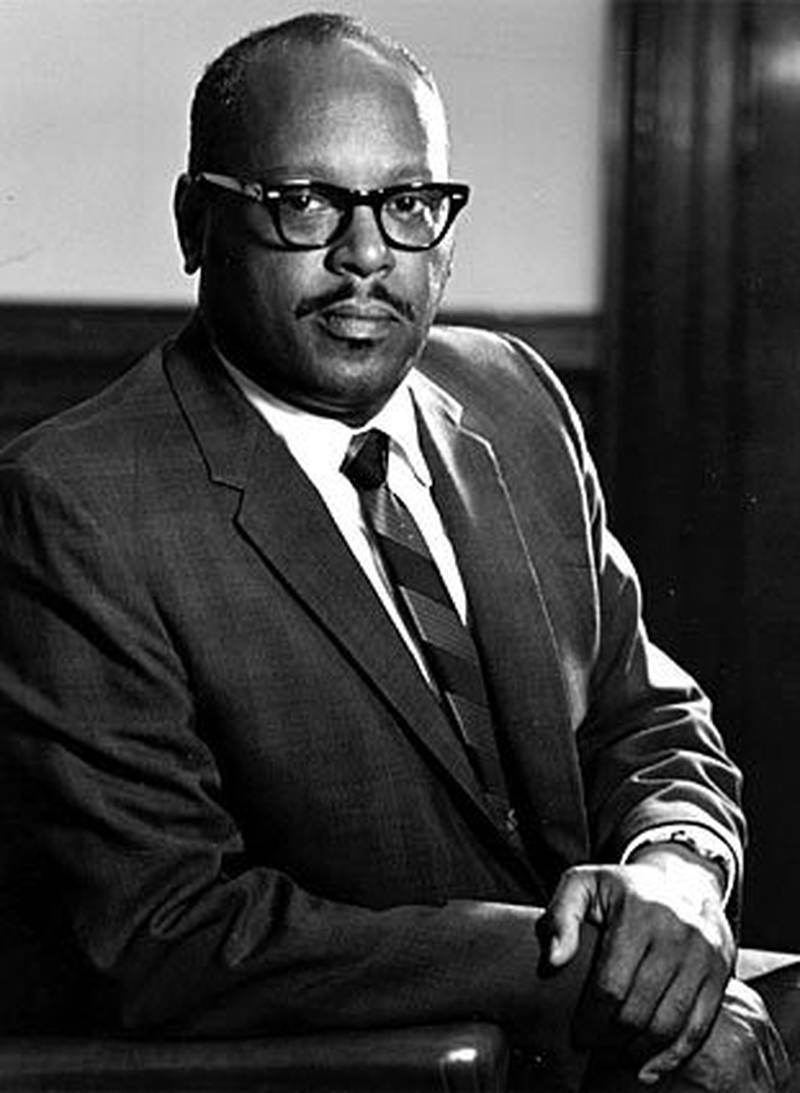

Judge, Maryland Court of Appeals
- In office 1977–1991
- Nominated by: Governor Blair Lee, III
- Preceded by: Frederick J. Singley Jr.
- Succeeded by: Robert M. Bell

Judge, Supreme Bench of Baltimore City
- In office 1967–1977
- Appointed by: Spiro T. Agnew

Member of the Maryland State Senate
- In office 1955–1966

Personal details
- Born: January 1, 1921 Washington, D.C., U.S.
- Died: February 14, 1999 (aged 78) Baltimore, Maryland, U.S.
- Party: Republican
- Spouse: Doris F. Cole
- Children: Susan Cole Hill; Harriette Cole; Stephanie Hill
- Education: Morgan State University, University of Maryland Law School

Harry A. Cole (January 1, 1921 – February 14, 1999) was an American lawyer, jurist and politician. He was a member of the Maryland State Senate from Baltimore, Maryland. He was the first African-American ever elected to the Maryland Senate and the first African-American to serve on the Maryland Court of Appeals.

== Background ==
Born in Washington, D.C., Cole was one of five children. His father died while he was an infant and his mother moved the family back to Baltimore where she had grown up. Cole attended Baltimore public schools and graduated from Douglass High School, he then attended and graduated as class valedictorian from Morgan State College with an A.B. in 1943. Immediately after college, Cole joined the U.S. Army where he was commissioned as a 1st Lieutenant in the Quartermaster Corps. He received an honorable discharge in 1946. Cole resumed his education and went on to the University of Maryland Law School where he earned an LL.B. in 1949. He was admitted to the Maryland Bar in 1949.

== Judicial career ==
Associate Judge, Municipal Court of Baltimore City, 1967. Associate Judge, Supreme Bench of Baltimore City (now Circuit Court), 1967–77. Associate Judge, Maryland Court of Appeals, 1977–91.

== Personal life ==
Cole married the former Doris Freeland in 1958; three daughters: Susan, Harriette and Stephanie. He died of pneumonia at Church Home, Baltimore, Maryland on February 14, 1999.

== See also ==
- List of African-American jurists
- List of first minority male lawyers and judges in Maryland
