= Jane Cleo Marshall Lucas =

First African American female to pass the Maryland bar exam

Jane Cleo Marshall Lucas (1920-2013) was the first African American female to pass the Maryland bar exam.

Lucas was born in Benton Harbor, Michigan, in June 1920 to Edson S. and Angelina (Lina) Marshall. She attended Howard University after obtaining a scholarship in 1937. She studied Political Science there and graduated June 13, 1941, with a Magna Cum Laude designation. She graduated from the University of Michigan Law School in 1944 and passed the bar exam. In 1945, she married Wendell M. Lucas. Lucas was a former captain in the U.S. Army Air Corps and Tuskegee Airman.

She worked for an Atlanta attorney before taking and passing the Maryland bar exam in 1946. She thus became the first African American female admitted to practice law in Maryland. Marshall achieved another historical first the same year by becoming the first female full-time faculty member of Howard University School of Law. Thus, due to Lucas becoming an educator, Juanita Jackson Mitchell has the distinction of becoming the first African American female to actually practice law in Maryland in 1950. Lucas resigned from the faculty in 1950, and eventually settled with her husband permanently in the Washington, D.C., area. She died November 4, 2013, in Burtonsville, Maryland.

== See also ==
- List of first women lawyers and judges in Maryland
