= Hannah Battersby =

American sideshow performer

Hannah Jane Battersby
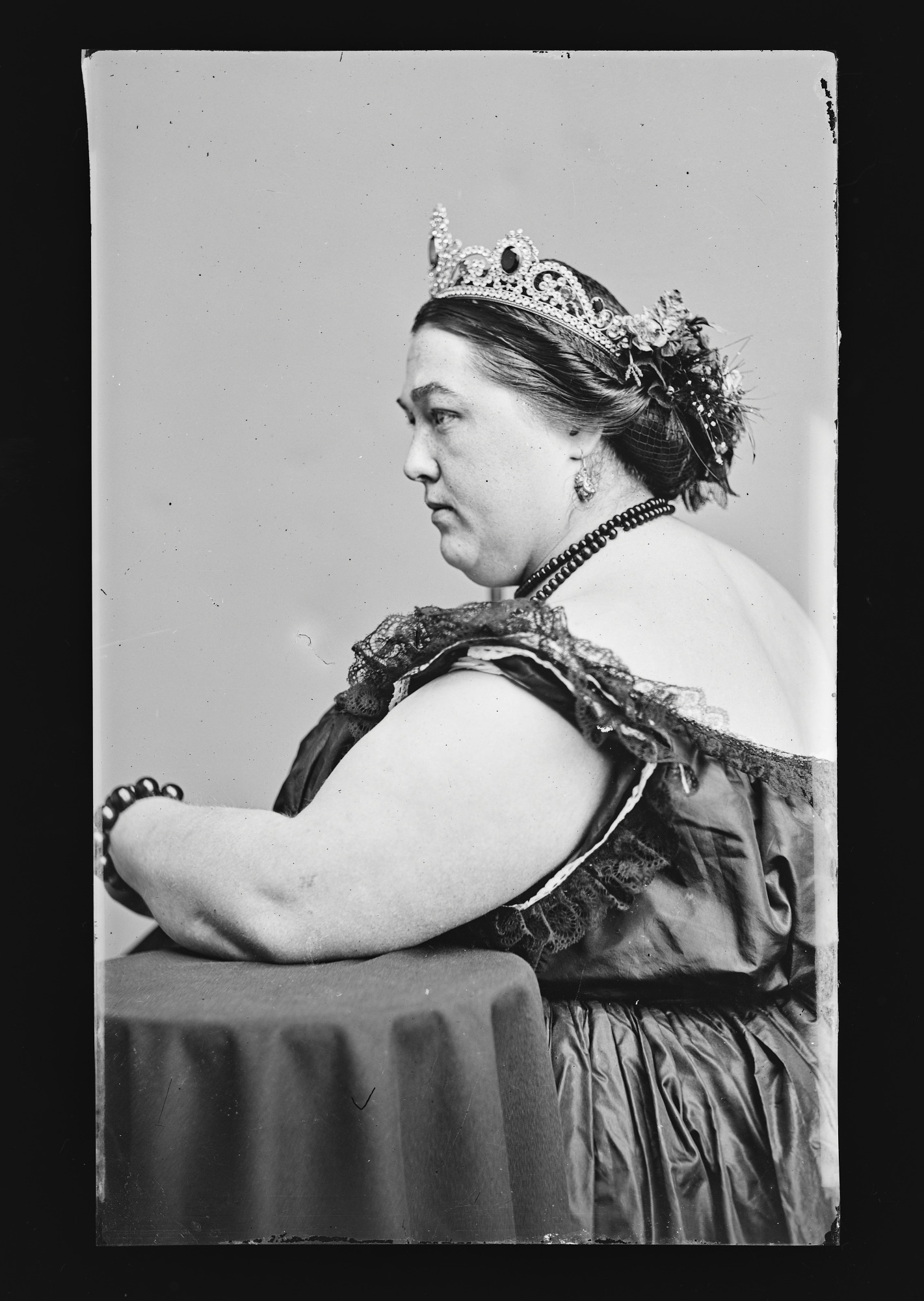
- Battersby, c. 1865
- Born: Hannah Jane Perkins c. 1836; Rome, Maine, US
- Died: April 19th, 1889; Frankford, Pennsylvania, US
- Resting place: Cedar Hill Cemetery, Philadelphia, Pennsylvania, US
- Occupation: Sideshow performer
- Years active: 1869-1889
- Employer: P. T. Barnum
- Spouse: John Lord Battersby (1829-1897)
- Children: 4

Hannah Jane Battersby (née Perkins); (c. 1836 – November 25, 1889) was an American "Fat Lady" sideshow performer and the wife of "Human Skeleton" John Battersby (1829–1897). She performed for companies including the Barnum & Bailey Circus alongside Lavinia Warren and Charles Stratton (General Tom Thumb) between 1859 and 1889 and was often advertised as the fattest woman in America.

== Early life ==
Hannah Jane Perkins was born to farmer Joseph Perkins (1776-1853) and his wife Nancy Perkins (née Sawtell; 1796-?) in Rome, Maine, and was one of between nine and fourteen children. It is unclear exactly when she was born, as in the 1850 census she is recorded as 14 years old, but at her death in 1889 was recorded to be only 45. Her biographer wrote that her paternal great-grandfather had been born in England and her grandfather fought in the Revolutionary War.

== Performing career ==
The earliest record of Battersby performing as a Fat Lady is in 1869 at P.T. Barnum's American Dime Museum. She was billed variously as both a "Giantess" and a "Mammoth Fat Lady".

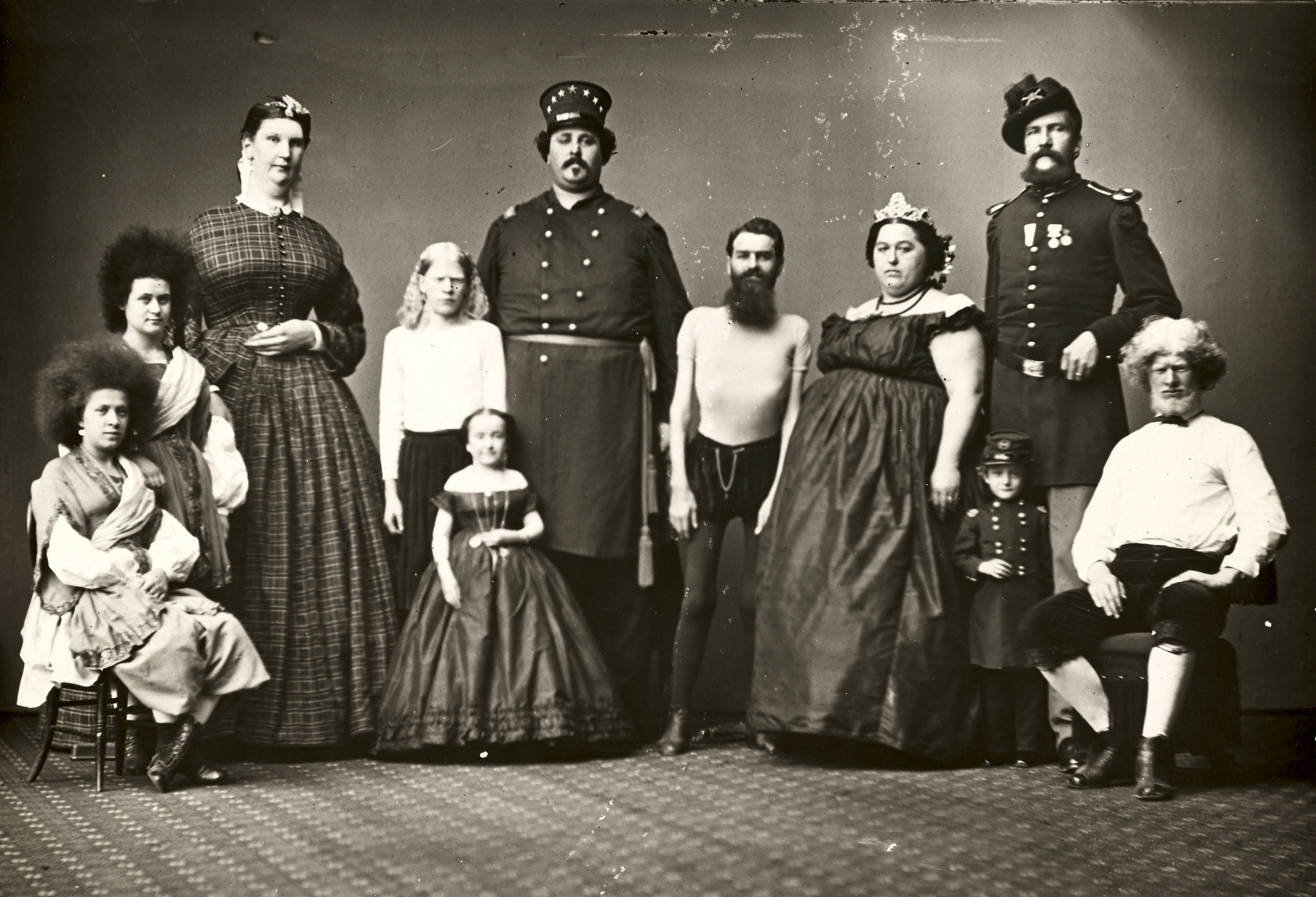
Battersby, third from right, with a group of Barnum's performers around 1865

In 1883, she was said to weigh 760 pounds and earn a salary of $200/week. Other sources reported that she was paid a dollar per pound, which would have provided a salary of between six and eight hundred dollars a week, but it is unlikely that she was actually paid that much. Though wages for Fat Lady performers toward the end of the nineteenth century were often as low as $5 a week, Battersby and her husband were supposedly worth $10,000 during the height of their popularity.

She was often reported to have rivalries with other Fat Lady performers, including Kate Keithley and Big Winnie Johnson. As part of her nationwide touring, Battersby reportedly participated in a "Fat Ladies' Convention" in October 1886 and was frequently advertised as the fattest woman in America. Performers' weights were generally exaggerated for effect, so it is likely that Battersby weighed significantly less than advertised.

She visited renowned Civil War photographer Mathew Brady's studio around 1865 and had a variety of portraits made both alone and with other Barnum & Bailey performers (see images). As part of her commercial strategy, she and her managers sold carte de visite photographs of her in costume.

Battersby's twenty-year career and her work with Barnum meant that she was relatively well-known in the business and was often upheld as the standard to beat. After her death, she was frequently referenced by reporters and compared to other Fat Lady performers like Della Beck and Ada Briggs.

== Personal life ==
Hannah was reported to have married the British-born Quaker John Battersby (1829-1897) in 1870, though it is more likely they married in the late 1850s as their first surviving child was born in 1858. John was a fellow performer billed as a "Living Skeleton" who weighed under one hundred pounds; they were often photographed together to emphasize their different sizes. In an interview, he claimed that they married in 1862 when Hannah weighed 480 pounds.

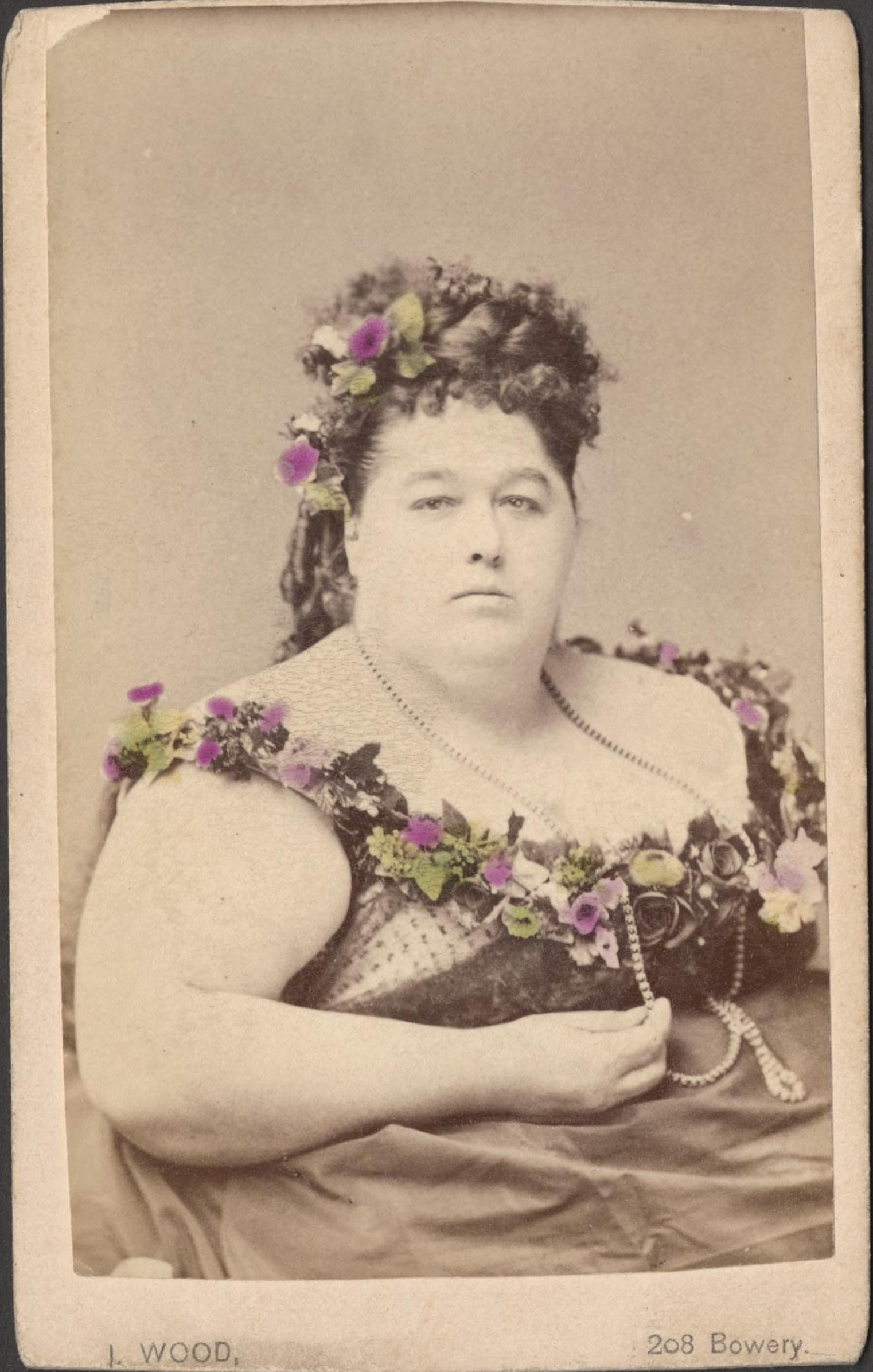
Hannah Battersby, c. 1864 in New York City

Some scholars regard this marriage as suspect, as it was a common advertising tactic to "marry" two performers who either looked very different or were exactly the same (like the short-statured Lavinia and Charles Stratton). Whether or not this was the case, the Battersbys had multiple children together and in his will John bequeathed Hannah's gold wedding band to their granddaughter Roberta Huckel.

While articles about Hannah generally claimed that she had grown in size after the onset of puberty at the age of twelve, John's biographer recorded that he had been of normal size until the age of sixteen, at which point he became frail. Hannah was said to be six feet tall or more, while John was recorded in 1871 to be five foot eight and forty-six pounds (though in a later interview he claimed his lightest weight was 59 lbs in 1853). However, in images of them standing side-by-side, they appear to be around the same height.

Hannah lived with her family in Maine until at least 1850. Due to her travels with circus companies and to dime museums for work, her children were born in various states including Illinois and Kentucky. The couple lived in Maine for the first half of the 1860s before moving to John's home state of Pennsylvania in 1866, where her last two children were born.

John was reported to have been in a wagon accident in 1873 that rendered him unable to walk, after which he ran a blacksmithing business in Frankford, PA, and Hannah continued to travel for work. In the 1880 census, they were recorded living with their daughter Rachel (1858-1933) in Philadelphia, Pennsylvania, at which time John had a spinal affliction.

Hannah and John performed in the 1880s with their daughter Zanobia Edith Battersby (1866-1885), marketed as the "African Cannibal Fan Child". It is unclear whether she was their daughter by birth, as her obituary at nineteen described her as adopted, a "light mulatto" girl born in Africa.

== Death ==
Battersby died on April 15, 1889, in Frankford, Pennsylvania, where she had been living with her husband. Obituaries reported that she had been ill for some time and had lost significant weight before her death. Reports of her coffin's size and weight were sensationalized in the press, which scholars have pointed out as a frequent reaction to the deaths of people of unusual body size during this time.
