= List of first minority male lawyers and judges in Maryland =

This is a list of the first minority male lawyer(s) and judge(s) in Maryland. It includes the year in which the men were admitted to practice law (in parentheses). Also included are men who achieved other distinctions such becoming the first in their state to graduate from law school or become a political figure.

== Firsts in Maryland's history ==
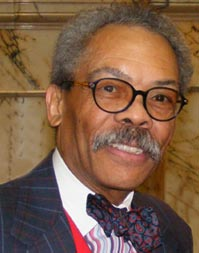
Robert M. Bell: First African American male Chief Judge of the Maryland Court of Appeals (1996)

=== Law Clerk ===
- First African American male to clerk for a federal judge: Larry S. Gibson (1967)

=== Lawyers ===
- First African American male to petition for admission to the Maryland State Bar: Edward Garrison Draper in 1857, but he was denied
- First African American male admitted to practice before Maryland's federal courts: James Harris Wolff in 1875
- First African American male: Everett J. Waring (1885)
- First African American male admitted after passing the Maryland State Bar exam: Harvey Johnson (c. 1888)

=== State judges ===
- First Jewish American male (Maryland Court of Appeals): Simon Sobeloff in 1952
- First African American male (court of record): E. Everett Lane (1923) in 1957
- First African American male (municipal court): Robert B. Watts in 1960
- First African American male (circuit court): George L. Russell Jr. (1954) in 1966
- First African American male (district court): J. Franklyn Bourne, Jr. (1948) in 1971
- First African American male (Maryland Special Court of Appeals): David T. Mason in 1974
- First African American male (Maryland Court of Appeals): Harry A. Cole (1949) in 1977
- First African American male (chief judge of any Maryland court): Michael Waring Lee in 1984
- First African American male (Chief Judge; Maryland Court of Appeals): Robert M. Bell (1969) in 1996
- First Muslim American male: Hassan Ali El-Amin in 2000
- First Hispanic American male: Ricardo Zwaig in 2010
- First African American and openly gay male (Chief Judge; Maryland Court of Special Appeals): E. Gregory Wells in 2022

=== Federal judges ===
- First African American male (U.S. District Court for the District of Maryland): Joseph C. Howard Sr. (1955) in 1979
- First Asian American male (U.S. District Court for the District of Maryland): Theodore D. Chuang (1994)

=== Attorney General of Maryland ===
- First African American male: Anthony Brown in 2022

=== Assistant Attorney General ===
- First African American male: Harry A. Cole (1949) in 1953

=== United States Attorney for the District of Maryland ===
- First Jewish American male: Simon Sobeloff in 1931
- First Asian American male: Robert Hur in 2018
- First African American male: Erek Barron in 2021

=== Assistant United States Attorney ===
- First African American male: John R. Hargrove Sr. (1950) in 1957

=== County Attorney ===
- First African American male: Larnzell Martin, Jr. in 1986

=== Maryland State Bar Association ===
- First Hispanic American male president: Robert T. Gonzales in 1995
- First African American male president: Harry S. Johnson in 2003
- First African American male posthumously admitted to the Bar by Supreme Court of Maryland: Edward Garrison Draper in 2023

== Firsts in local history ==
- Richard E. King: First African American male lawyer in Anne Arundel County, Maryland
- Clayton Greene Jr. (1977): First African American male judge in Anne Arundel County, Maryland (1989)
- Everett Waring (1885): First African American male lawyer admitted to the Supreme Bench of Baltimore City on October 10, 1885
- Harry Sythe Cummings and Charles W. Johnson: First African American males to graduate from the Maryland School of Law (1889)
- George L. Russell Jr. (1954): First African American male appointed as a City Solicitor and Judge of the Supreme Bench of Baltimore City, Maryland
- Joseph C. Howard Sr. (1955): First African American male to serve on the Baltimore City Supreme Court (1968)
- John R. Hargrove Sr. (1950): First African American male appointed as the Administrative Judge of the District Court of Maryland for Baltimore City (1971)
- George L. Rosedom: First African American male to serve as an Assistant State's Attorney for the City of Baltimore
- Michael L. "M.L." McCampbell: First African American male judge in Baltimore County, Maryland (1990)
- James R. Benjamin, Jr.: First African American male to serve as the County Attorney of Baltimore County, Maryland (2019)
- E. Gregory Wells: First African American (male) to serve as the Calvert County State’s Attorney
- William Davis, Jr.: First African American male judge in Cecil County, Maryland
- Anthony "Tony" Covington: First African American male to serve as the State's Attorney for Charles County, Maryland (2011)
- George Ames, Jr.: First African American male judge in Dorchester County, Maryland. In 2023, he became the first African American male Chief Justice of the Dorchester County Orphans Court.
- Ricardo Zwaig: First Hispanic American male in Howard County, Maryland (2010)
- Richard "Rich" Gibson: First African American male to serve as the State’s Attorney for Howard County, Maryland (2019)
- DeLawrence Beard (1974): First African American male judge in Montgomery County, Maryland (1982)
- Brian G. Kim: First Asian American male judge in Montgomery County, Maryland
- Victor Del Pino: First Latino American male to lead the Montgomery County State’s Attorney’s Office’s gang prosecution unit. He later became a judge.
- J. Franklyn Bourne, Jr. (1948): First African American to set up a law practice (c. 1950s) and serve as a Judge of the District 5 Court (1971) in Prince George’s County, Maryland
- Larnzell Martin, Jr.: First African American male to serve as the County Attorney for Prince George's County, Maryland (1986)
- James H. Taylor: First African American male to serve as the Assistant State’s Attorney and a Circuit Court Judge for Prince George’s County, Maryland. He was also the first African American male member of the Prince George’s County Bar Association.
- Howard S. Chasanow: First Jewish American male to serve as the Assistant State’s Attorney for Prince George’s County, Maryland
- Andrew Yslas: First Hispanic American male to serve as the Assistant State’s Attorney for Prince George’s County, Maryland
- Alexander Wiliiams Jr. (1973): First African American male elected as the State's Attorney in Prince George's County, Maryland. He would later become a district court judge.
- Gerald Purnell: First African American male lawyer in Berlin, Worcester County, Maryland

== See also ==
- List of first minority male lawyers and judges in the United States

== Other topics of interest ==
- List of first women lawyers and judges in the United States
- List of first women lawyers and judges in Maryland
