= Amelia E. Johnson =

Canadian writer and poet (1858–1922)

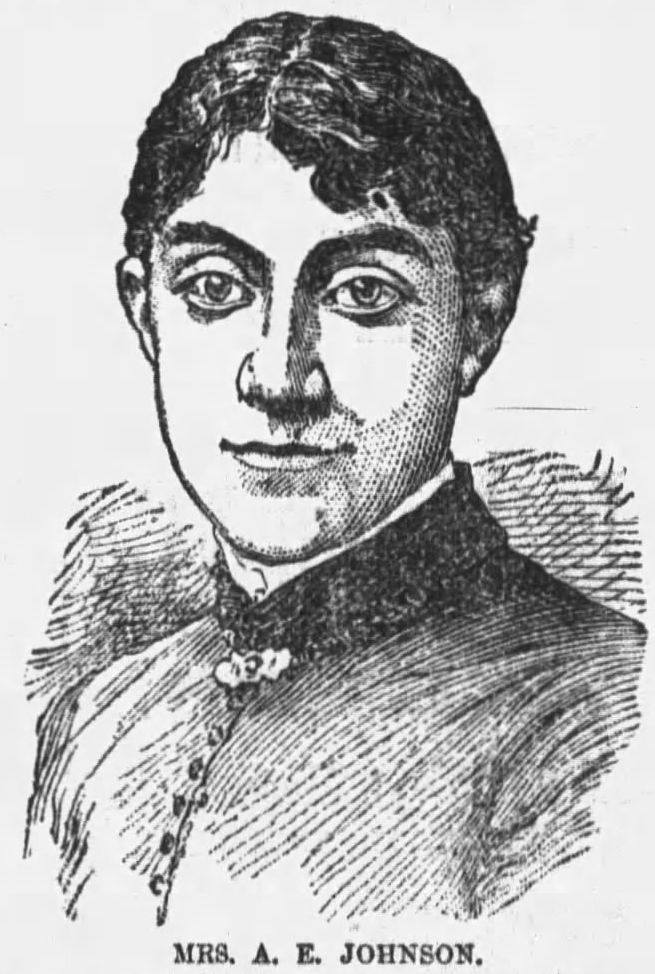
- Johnson in 1892
- Born: Amelia Etta Hall Johnson; 1858; Toronto, Canada West
- Died: 1922 (aged 63–64)
- Resting place: Laurel Cemetery, Baltimore, U.S.
- Occupations: Writer and poet
- Spouse: Rev. Harvey Johnson

Amelia E. Johnson (Amelia Etta Hall Johnson, 1858–1922) was a Canadian writer and poet.

== Early life and career ==
Johnson was born in Toronto, Canada West. As an editor she sought to encourage other writers with African American ancestry by publishing their works in a short periodical. Writing under the name Mrs. A. E. Johnson, her approach to fiction has been compared to Emma Dunham Kelley and Paul Laurence Dunbar, focusing on the social circumstances of her characters rather than identifying ethnic or "racial" aspects.

The study of her works by literary critics after a century of obscurity renewed interest in Johnson, though she had been praised by her contemporaries. Johnson's works include children's literature, Sunday school fiction, and three novels: Clarence and Corinne, which was the first Black-authored work to be published by the American Baptist Publication Society of Philadelphia, The Hazeley Family (1894), and Martina Meriden (2020).

== Personal life ==
She was married to a well-known Baptist minister, Reverend Harvey Johnson, whom she met after moving to Boston in the United States. She published in many well-known Black print venues, such as The Baptist Messenger, The American Baptist, and Our Women and Children.

She is also the English translator of "Sleeping Beauty" by Charles Perrault (Dodd Mead and Company, 1921)

In 1887, she published The Joy and, in 1888, she published The Ivy. These short-lived magazines targeted young African Americans and educated them about their culture, The Joy targeting young girls with stories and The Ivy spreading awareness of African-American history.

Johnson is interred at Laurel Cemetery in Baltimore.
