= Brotherhood of Liberty =

Used legal means to protect the civil rights of African Americans

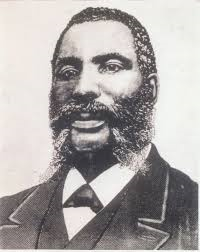
Harvey Johnson

Established June 2, 1885, in Baltimore, Maryland, the Mutual United Brotherhood of Liberty (known as the Brotherhood of Liberty) sought to remove social injustices and protect the civil rights of the black minority by fighting against the strictures of the Jim Crow Era. The Brotherhood of Liberty used legal means to protect the civil rights of African American people. The Brotherhood of Liberty was founded by Rev. Harvey Johnson, a pastor at Union Baptist Church, and other local pastors, Ananias Brown, William Moncure Alexander, Patrick Henry Alexander, John Calvin Allen, and W. Charles Lawson. They advocated for the right of colored people to practice law in Maryland. The Brotherhood of Liberty created schools for the black community and were pioneers in assisting colored people in getting a better education, being united, and improving their standard of living.

At the time the Brotherhood was established in Baltimore, there was no high school for African American children and no African American teachers. African American educators passed the examination to become a teacher, but the school board refused to appoint them as teachers. Separate African American schools had all white teachers. The brotherhood petitioned and appeared before the city council, the board of school commissioner and the city courts to resolve this issue. The school board said that there were not enough of African Americans on the Northwest side of Baltimore to have a public elementary school. The brotherhood enrolled 300 children at Shiloh Baptist Church and hired three teachers. The school board was convinced and the first new school for African Americans was built at Carrollton and Riggs Ave. The first African American appointed teacher and principal were Fannie Barbour and George Biddle. The school was not opened immediately because whites in the area were determined to take over the school and make it all-white. The Brotherhood of Liberty created the first colored schools with colored teachers and principals and provided them with resources to succeed.

The Brotherhood of Liberty and its members accomplished much for the African American community in Maryland. In 1885, Everett Waring, council member of the Brotherhood of Liberty, became the first black attorney to practice law in the Maryland court system. Waring was the first black person admitted to the bar of Court of Appeals in 1880, which opened the door to allowing five more black Baltimoreans to be allowed admittance to the University of Maryland School of Law in 1890. In 1889 William M. Alexander, an original member of the Brotherhood of Liberty, opened Public School No. 9, the first public school for black children. In 1888 at Irving Park, the Brotherhood celebrated the removal of the word "white" from statute books of Maryland.

== See also ==
- Justice and Jurisprudence
