= Harriette Cole =

American journalist

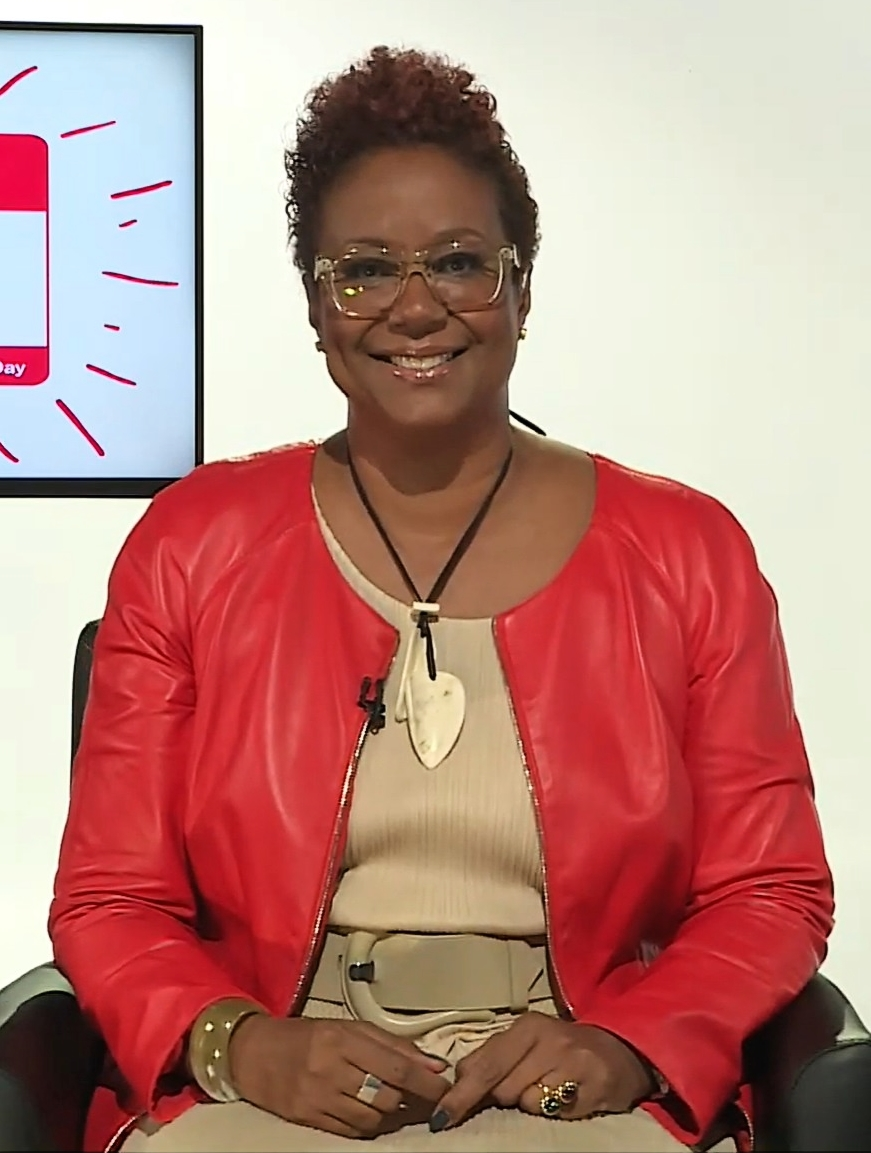
Cole in 2016

Harriette Cole, is a life stylist, author, nationally syndicated advice columnist, motivational speaker, media trainer, magazine editor, lifestyle writer, wife and mother.

== Early life and education ==
Cole was born in Baltimore, Maryland, the middle of three sisters. Her parents are Doris Freeland Cole, a retired kindergarten teacher who has devoted her life to her children, and the Honorable Harry A. Cole, the first black judge on the Maryland Court of Appeals. Cole's sisters are Susan Hill, a vice president at Disney in Los Angeles, and Stephanie Hill, a vice president at Lockheed Martin in Maryland.

Cole attended public schools in Baltimore, including Dickey Hill Elementary School, Greenspring Junior High School, and Western High School. She graduated from the all-girls' Western High School.

Cole spent her first year in college at Towson State University. She completed her college education at Howard University, where she became a member of Delta Sigma Theta sorority.

== Career ==
Cole worked for then freshmen member of Congress Barbara Boxer after she graduated from college. During that year she continued to freelance as a runway model. She became an assistant editor at Essence magazine in the lifestyle section, then known as Contemporary Living.

For the next several years, Cole was promoted annually until she became the editor of that section. During her tenure in Contemporary Living Cole traveled all over the world documenting cultures of people of African descent. Her travels took her to the Ivory Coast in West Africa, Zimbabwe in Southern Africa, Bahia, Brazil, Paris, France, throughout the Caribbean and also across the United States.

In 1995 she left Essence and launched her own media company which is now titled Harriette Cole Media.

Through her 20-year-old business, Cole has participated in a broad range of projects. She has written a number of books including How to Be: A Guide to Conscious Living, Choosing Truth, Vows and Coming Together. She has helped to launch a number of magazines, including Uptown and others. Cole led the visual transformation of Ebony magazine, and most recently served as editor in chief of the magazine. During her 3½ years at Ebony, Cole produced covers featuring Barack and Michelle Obama before he announced his run for the presidency, Michelle Obama in the thick of the campaign, which Cole authored, Barack Obama days after he was elected, Michael Jackson for his final photo shoot and interview, and Prince.

Cole has provided media training, presentation training and/or fashion styling for many clients, including Mary J. Blige, Alicia Keys, Carl Thomas, JoJo, Shontelle, and Hal Linton.

Cole has provided presentation and empowerment workshops for businesses and institutions, including Speaking of Women's Health, Kraft, Cornell University, the National Urban League, National Action Network, Jack and Jill of America, Delta Sigma Theta, and others.

Cole hosted a reality series on the ABC Family Channel, called Perfect Match New York. She hosted a daily radio show on XM Satellite radio, called Pulse. For the past ten years she has written the nationally syndicated advice column (six days a week), "Sense & Sensitivity," which is syndicated by United Media/United Features Syndicate.

== Media ==
She has been a frequent guest on the Today Show, offering advice on how to be your best. She has been featured on Access Hollywood, The Insider, MSNBC, LXTV, The Oprah Winfrey Show, Rachael Ray, NPR, BET and TVOne.

== Family ==
Harriette Cole has been married to fashion and beauty photographer George Chinsee since 1993. They have a daughter, Carrie Emmanuelle Cole Chinsee, who was born in 2003. They reside in New York City.
