= Emma Dunham Kelley-Hawkins =

American novelist (1863–1938)

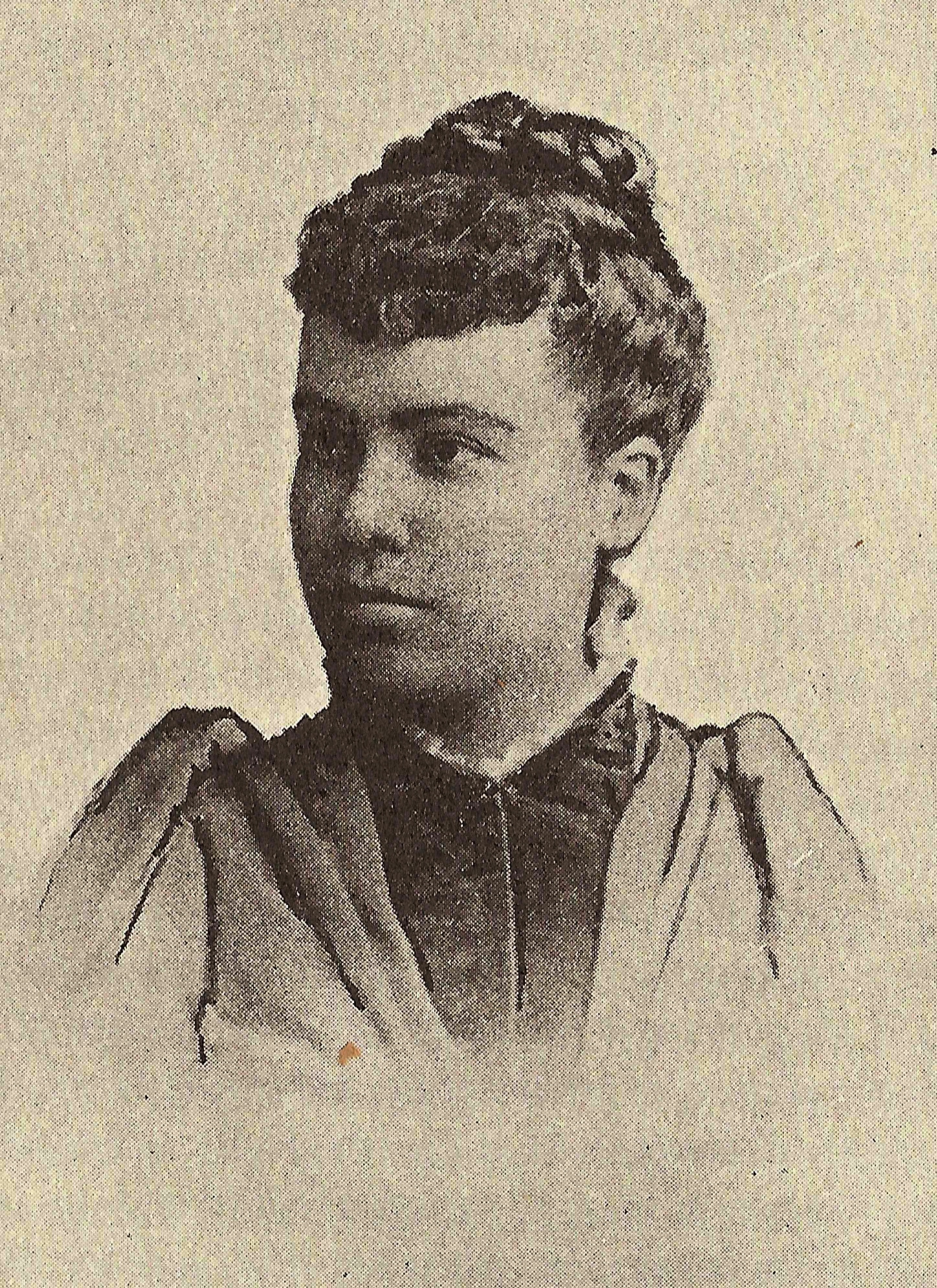
Emma Dunham Kelley from the frontispiece of Megda 1891.

Emma Dunham Kelley-Hawkins (November 11, 1863 – October 22, 1938) was an American writer, and author of the novel Four Girls At Cottage City (1895). An earlier novel, Megda (1891), was published under her maiden name of Emma Dunham Kelley and the pseudonym "Forget-me-not." Her father was Isaac Kelley, a sailor; her mother was Gabriella A. (Chase), and she had an older sister and younger half-brother. Kelley-Hawkins married Benjamin A. Hawkins, a civil engineer, in 1892, and had two daughters. Kelley-Hawkins and her work, which focused on themes of religion and gender, fell into obscurity before her death in 1938 as well as many years following. She later rose to prominence following the rediscovery of her works, with many focused on her racial identity.

== Biography ==
On November 11, 1863, in Dennis, Massachusetts, Emma Dunham Kelley-Hawkins was born the youngest of two children to Isaac Kelley, a sailor, and Gabriella A. (Chase) Kelley. On April 4, 1863, her father alongside her uncles, Johial Chase and Captain Hersey Crowell, were declared dead after disappearing off the coast of Rhode Island. Kelley-Hawkins and her older sister, Alice, were then left under the parentage of their widowed mother.

She and her family remained in Dennis until at least the year 1865, before departing for New Bedford, where they would stay with her aunt, Emily (Chase) Bryant. During this time, her mother remarried, giving birth to her younger half-brother.

The family relocated once more in 1868, to Lonsdale, Rhode Island. Kelly-Hawkins, alongside her brother, attended school while her older sister and her mother, now widowed a second time, worked in nearby mills.

In 1885, having completed her education, Kelley-Hawkins worked as a schoolteacher. While doing this, at the age of twenty-eight, she published her first novel, Megda (1891), under the pseudonym "Forget-Me-Not." Not long after, on July 14, 1892, she married a civil engineer, Benjamin Arnon Hawkins. In the years 1894 and 1897, they had two daughters, Gala and Megda. Between this time, in 1895, Kelley-Hawkins published her second and final novel, Four Girls at Cottage City.

Her marriage was racked with financial difficulties, her husband having invested much of their income on unsuccessful inventions. Their home was lost to foreclosure, and they underwent frequent moves, renting various houses. Following the death of her husband on November 22, 1929, Kelley-Hawkins and her two children moved to Providence.

After many struggles, she gained financial stability with a large inheritance left by her aunt, Lavina Chase. With it, she bought a house in Rumford, Rhode Island before dying a few years later on October 22, 1938, of heart disease. She was buried in Moshassuck Cemetery in Central Falls, Rhode Island beside her family.

== Authorship ==
Emma Dunham Kelley-Hawkins was long considered a pioneer of African American women's literature, and for a brief time, was looked upon as the first published African American woman novelist. Her body of work consists of two novels: Megda (1891) and Four Girls at Cottage City (1895). A third novel, to be a sequel to Megda, was drafted but never published.

According to scholars, owing to such factors as race and gender, much like other Black women writers at the time, Kelley-Hawkins's works fell into obscurity and were mostly forgotten, even before her death. Her novels were, however, included in various collections and bibliographies, including A Century of Fiction by American Negros 1853–1952: A Descriptive Bibliography (1955), Charles L. Blockson's bibliography of African American Literature, as well as other encyclopedias and compilations by Robert A. Corrigan, Carole McAlpine, and Robert Whitlow. Her work was later rediscovered by Henry Louis Gates Jr., serving as an inspiration for him to compile the 40-volume Schomburg Library of Nineteenth-Century Black Women Writers in 1988.

While many African American writers at the time dealt explicitly with issues of race, Kelley-Hawkins's work did not treat themes of racial uplift. They were absent of Black characters and matters of race, instead focusing mainly on themes of religion and gender, while also addressing issues of education, region, social class, and so on. This treatment is similar to fiction by other black authors of the period, including selected works by Frances Ellen Watkins Harper, Frank J. Webb, Paul Laurence Dunbar, and Amelia E. Johnson, for example.

Kelley-Hawkins's novels, often considered anomalous among the African American literary tradition by presiding scholarship, follow the lives of young girls and are characterized by their Christian outreach, spiritual feminism, and the whiteness of their characters.

=== Megda (1891) ===
Written in dedication to her mother, Megda was Kelley-Hawkins's first published novel. It follows the experiences of Megda, a young girl studying to be a schoolteacher, and a group of similar, middle-class girls through their Christian conversions and journeys to womanhood and wifehood. It focuses heavily on religious themes of salvation and gentility as it explores women's acceptance and roles in the Christian community.

=== Four Girls at Cottage City (1895) ===
Kelley-Hawkins's Four Girls at Cottage City, much like her first novel, Megda, focuses on themes of religion and spiritual feminism. It follows a group of four carefree, young girls vacationing at a Massachusetts resort during a summer religious camp meeting while each of them explores their religious beliefs, committing themselves to the Christian religion.

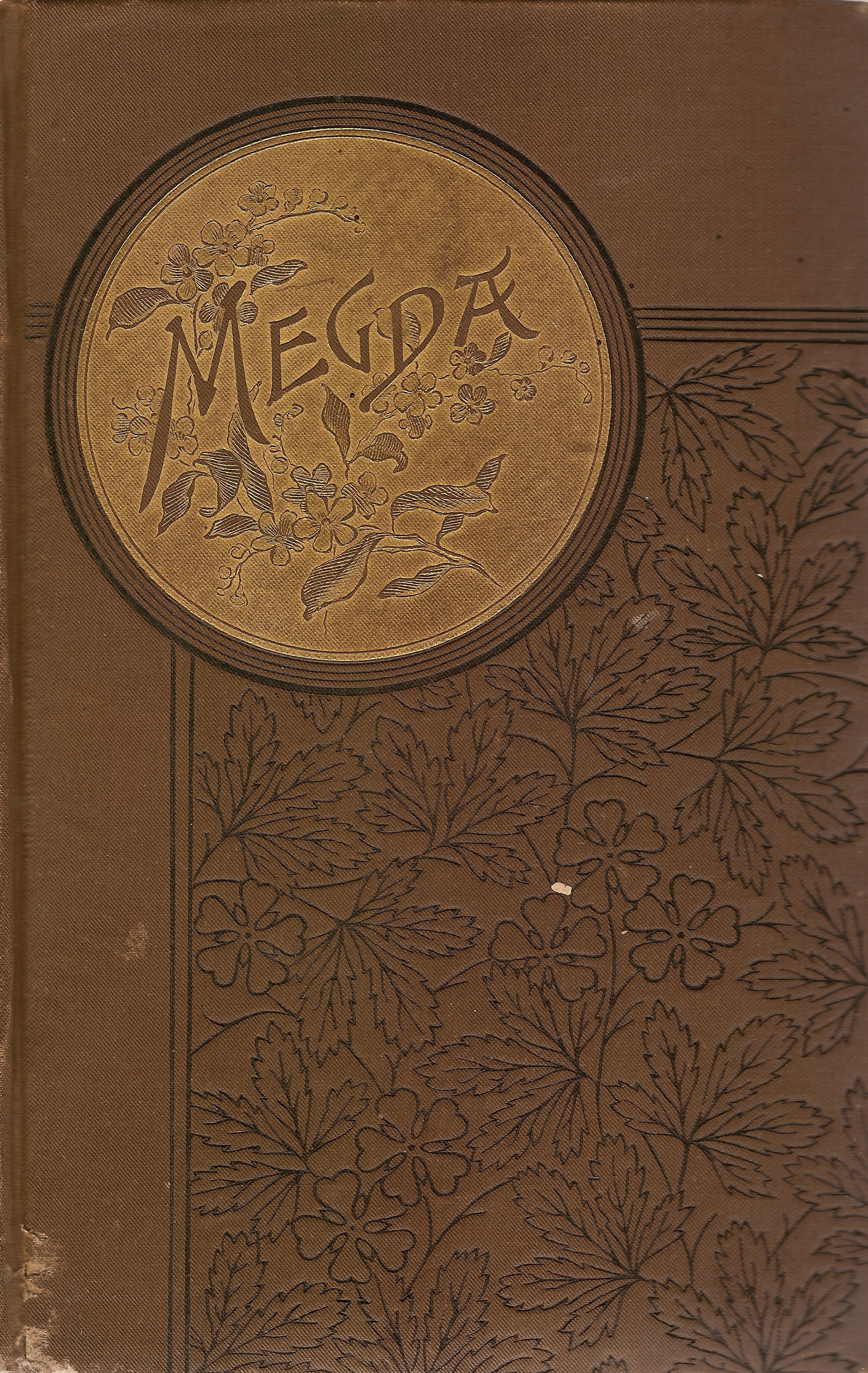
Megda, 1891

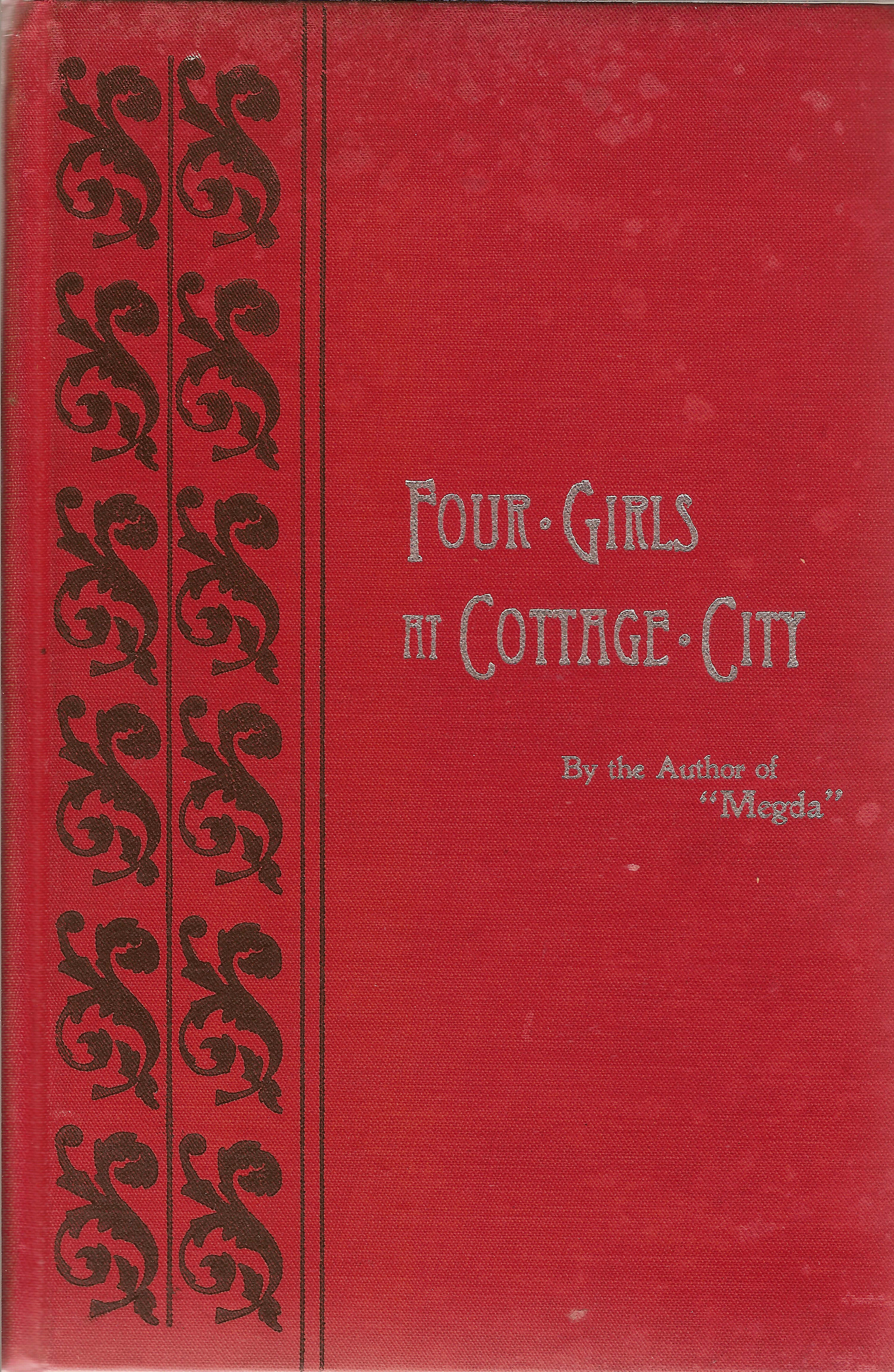
Four Girls at Cottage City, 1895

== Racial identity ==
For fifty years, Emma Dunham Kelley-Hawkins was touted and studied as a pioneer of African American women's literature. However, in 2005, an article in the Boston Globe appeared, asserting the author's identity as white. Later, in 2006, further genealogical research published indicated that Kelley-Hawkins was, in fact, white or identified herself as white. (National Genealogical Society Quarterly, Volume 94, No. 1, March 2006). Speculation has been made, assuming Kelley-Hawkins may have even descended from Irish immigrants.

During the reconstruction of lost or forgotten African American literature, Kelley-Hawkins's race, alongside others whose biographies and identities were unknown, was assumed based on what clues scholars could gather. No evidence, however, aside from a photograph pointed to her African heritage. In fact, through numerous examinations of US and state census records of Massachusetts and Rhode Island as well as her ancestral towns of Dennis, Yarmouth, Harwich, and Chatham, it has been discovered that neither Kelley-Hawkins nor her family members have ever identified as anything other than white. There were no traces of African heritage in her ancestry.

Much scholarship has attributed the case of her racial misidentification to the frontispiece of her first novel, Megda, which for many, had served as indisputable evidence of her classification as African American. The first case of her labeling as African American has been traced back to her inclusion in A Century of Fiction by American Negros 1853–1952: A Descriptive Bibliography (1955), when Maxwell Whiteman assumed Kelley-Hawkins was of African descent based on the frontispiece, classifying her as a "Negro author" in her bibliography annotation. Subsequent compilations and bibliographies followed suit as she was later included in Charles L. Blockson's bibliography of African American literature and served as inspiration for the 1988 Schomburg Collection of African American Women Writers of the Nineteenth-Century series.

For fifty years, Kelley-Hawkins has been solidified as a trailblazer in Black women's writing and an unquestionable contributor to the African American literary tradition. Many scholars have studied the lack of race in her novels, notions of raceless characters, racial passing, and so on, viewing her works as a tool to advance Black causes. In wake of her discovered racial identity, however, many were left debating whether or not Kelley-Hawkins should be removed from the African American literary canon and possibly added to the Anglo-American literary canon.

== Sources ==
- Shockley, Ann Allen. Afro-American Women Writers 1746–1933: An Anthology and Critical Guide, New Haven, Connecticut: Meridian Books, 1989. ISBN 0-452-00981-2
- Gates Jr., Henry Louis (1988). The Schomburg library of nineteenth-century Black women writers. New York: Oxford University Press. ISBN 978-0-19-505267-1.
