= Robert M. Bell =

American judge (born 1943)

Honorable Robert M. Bell
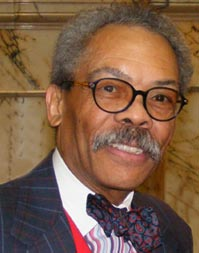

23rd Chief Judge of the Maryland Court of Appeals
- In office 1996 – July 6, 2013
- Nominated by: Parris Glendening
- Preceded by: Robert C. Murphy
- Succeeded by: Mary Ellen Barbera

Judge of the Maryland Court of Appeals
- In office 1991 – July 6, 2013
- Appointed by: William Donald Schaefer
- Preceded by: Harry A. Cole
- Succeeded by: Shirley M. Watts

Judge of the Maryland Court of Special Appeals
- In office 1984–1991
- Appointed by: Harry R. Hughes
- Succeeded by: Diana Gribbon Motz

Associate Judge of the Circuit Court for Baltimore City
- In office 1980–1984
- Appointed by: Harry R. Hughes

Associate Judge of the Maryland District Court for District 1, Baltimore City
- In office 1975–1980
- Appointed by: Marvin Mandel

Personal details
- Born: Robert Mack Bell; July 6, 1943 (age 83) Rocky Mount, North Carolina, U.S.
- Education: Morgan State College (AB); Harvard Law School (JD)

Robert Mack Bell (born July 6, 1943) is an American lawyer and jurist from Baltimore, Maryland. From 1996 to 2013, he served as Chief Judge on the Maryland Court of Appeals, now known as the Supreme Court of Maryland, the state's highest appellate court. He was the first African American to hold the position.

At 16 years old, Bell was the lead plaintiff in Bell v. Maryland, a case that ultimately helped push the U.S. toward desegregation. Bell served as a judge at every level of the Maryland court system; and on July 6, 2013, reached the state's mandatory retirement age of 70 years for appellate and circuit court judges.

== Background ==
Born in Rocky Mount, North Carolina, Bell's mother, a sharecropper, moved him and his two brothers to East Baltimore when he was one and a half years old. He attended Dunbar High School with classmate and friend Reginald F. Lewis. As a 16-year-old, he and a group of students participated in a sit-in to protest racial segregation at a local restaurant. On June 17, 1960, the group of 12 students entered Hooper's Restaurant, formerly located at Charles and Fayette Streets in downtown Baltimore, where they were refused service and asked to leave. The students, including Bell, refused. He and the other students were arrested and convicted in the Circuit Court of Baltimore City for criminal trespassing, and fined $10. The NAACP hired a team of lawyers, including Thurgood Marshall and Juanita Jackson Mitchell, to represent the students and appeal the conviction to the Maryland Court of Appeals. The appellants argued that the use of the state's trespassing laws to support segregation of public accommodations violated the Fourteenth Amendment to the United States Constitution. In 1962, the Court of Appeals upheld the decision of the circuit court.

The case was then appealed to the U.S Supreme Court, where Bell was represented by Constance Baker Motley and Jack Greenberg. In Bell v. Maryland (1964), the Supreme Court, noting that in the period since the students' conviction the Maryland General Assembly passed public accommodation laws and Congress passed the Civil Rights Act of 1964, refused to rule whether the state's trespassing laws could be used to exclude blacks from public accommodations. The Court vacated the decision and remanded the case to allow the state court to rule whether the conviction should be reversed due to the change in state law. On April 9, 1965, Bell's conviction was reversed by the state Court of Appeals and all of the students were cleared of all charges. The decision of the Supreme Court came just two days after the Senate ended a filibuster and passed the Civil Rights Act. It has been suggested that the Supreme Court refrained from reaching the merits of the case in consideration of the pending civil rights legislation, as had it done so, it would have eliminated the basis for passing the Act.

Bell later attended and graduated with a Bachelor of Arts in history from Morgan State University in Baltimore in 1966 and while there became a brother in Alpha Phi Omega. He then was admitted to Harvard Law School where he earned his Juris Doctor in 1969. That same year he was admitted to the bar and began his legal practice in Baltimore.

== Judicial career ==
In 1975, Bell was appointed to the District Court of Maryland, District 1, in Baltimore City and served there until 1980. He was an Associate Judge, Baltimore City Circuit Court, 8th Judicial Circuit, from 1980 to 1984 when he was appointed to the Maryland Court of Special Appeals.

As a circuit court judge, Bell presided over the 1984 jury trial of Alfred Chestnut, Ransom Watkins, and Andrew Stewart, three 16-year-olds charged in the November 1983 shooting death of 14-year-old DeWitt Duckett at Harlem Park Junior High School in Baltimore. After the jury convicted the three defendants of felony murder, Bell sentenced each of them to life in prison. In 2019, all four of the prosecution's identifying witnesses recanted during a reinvestigation by the Baltimore City State's Attorney's Conviction Integrity Unit. On November 25, 2019, Baltimore City Circuit Court Judge Charles Peters granted writs of actual innocence and vacated the convictions, and the three men, who became known as the Harlem Park Three, were released after 36 years in prison. The case is the subject of the 2026 HBO documentary When a Witness Recants.

Bell was appointed to the state's highest court and became the chief judge in 1996. He was a member, Court of Appeals Standing Committee on Rules of Practice and Procedure from 1977 to 1982; Commission to Revise the Annotated Code of Maryland, 1980–82; and the Board of Directors, Judicial Institute of Maryland, 1982–84. In August 2006, Bell was named Chair of the National Center for State Courts’ Board of Directors. At the same time, Judge Bell also was named president of the Conference of Chief Justices.

In April 2013, Bell announced that he would be retiring on July 6, 2013. After reaching Maryland's mandatory retirement age for state judges, 70, Bell retired from his position as Chief Judge of the Maryland Court of Appeals on July 6, 2013.

== Awards ==
Bell has also been the recipient of several awards:

- American Bar Association D'Alemberte-Raven Award for Outstanding Leadership in Alternative Dispute Resolution
- Legal Excellence Award for Advancement of Public Service Responsibility from the Maryland Bar Foundation
- Maryland Network Against Domestic Violence Special Recognition Award
- Maryland Leadership in Law Award
- Maryland Legal Services Corporation Medal for Access to Justice

== See also ==
- List of African-American jurists
- List of first minority male lawyers and judges in Maryland

== Notes ==
Legal offices
Preceded by Robert C. Murphy	Chief Judge of the Maryland Court of Appeals; 1996–2013	Succeeded by Mary Ellen Barbera
