= Big Winnie Johnson =

American sideshow performer

Winnie Johnson
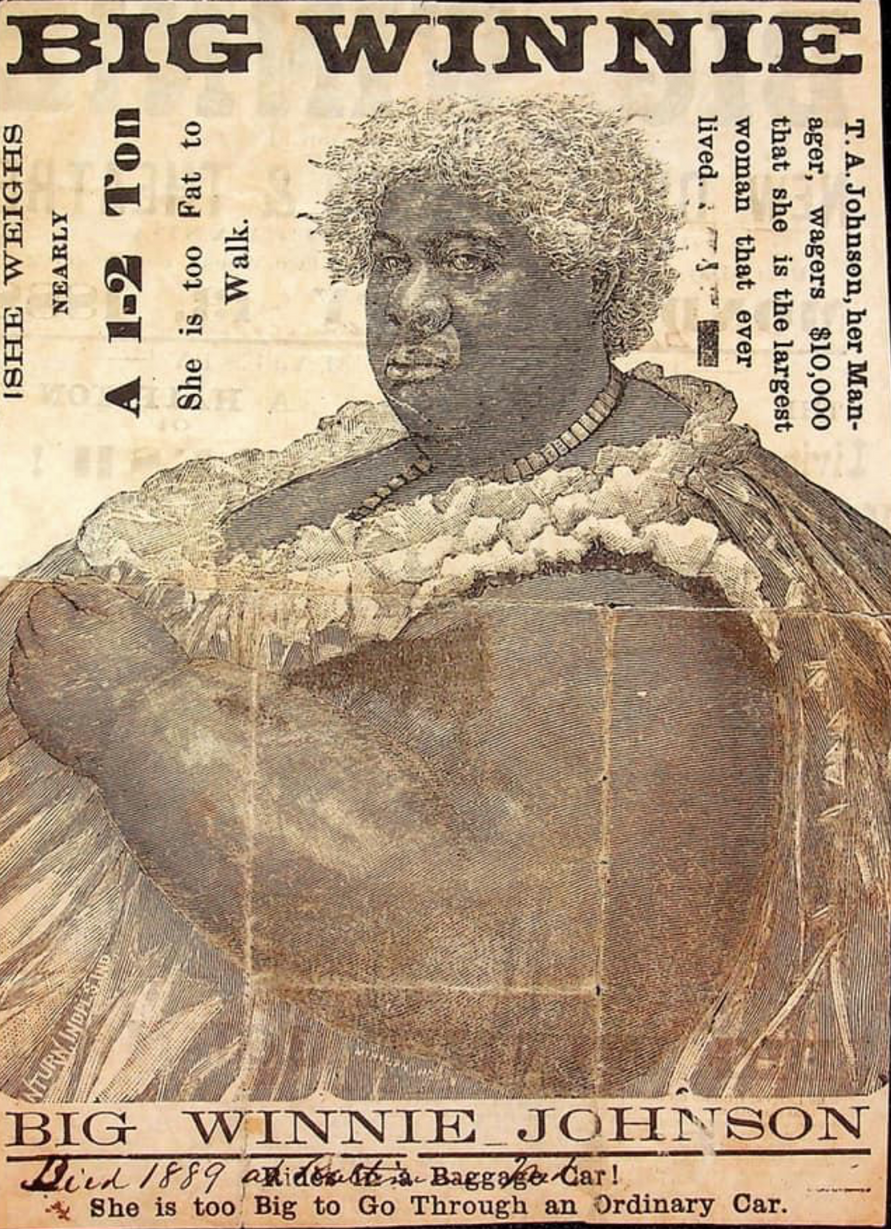
- Johnson in an 1888 publication
- Born: Winnie circa 1839; Henry County, Kentucky, US
- Died: September 4, 1888 (aged 48–49); Baltimore, Maryland, US
- Burial place: Laurel Cemetery
- Occupation: Sideshow performer
- Years active: 1882–1888
- Spouse: Benjamin Johnson (c. 1824/1830 – c.1882)
- Children: 4

"Big Winnie" Johnson (c. 1839 – September 4, 1888) was an American "Fat Lady" sideshow performer in the 1880s. Despite the relatively short span of her career, she became very well-known, performing for circuses and dime museums across the country. She was remembered for the exceptionally high salary she commanded as a Black "Fat Lady" performer in the United States, especially in northern Midwestern cities including Chicago and Cincinnati.

== Early life ==
Johnson was born into slavery on a farm in Henry County, Kentucky, possibly either under the ownership of the family of Boyd Clubb or Everett Millard Bryant.

- Joel H. Clubb and his wife Elizabeth Ann Ditto owned a farm in Pleasureville, Kentucky. Upon his death, Clubb was described as one of the wealthiest men in Henry County. The 1840 census records that Clubb enslaved six people: one boy and one girl under ten, two teenage girls or young women, one adult woman, and one adult man. It is possible that the girl was Winifred.
- John W. Bryant and his wife Eliza Ford owned a farm near Smithfield, KY. In 1850, they were recorded as owning a fifteen-year-old girl. In 1840, his father Samuel Bryant of Shelby, Kentucky, was recorded as enslaving sixteen people, three of which were girls under ten. Any of these girls could theoretically have been Winifred.

Her maiden name – if she had one – and birth details have been lost, but she was probably born between 1835 and 1840. Her publicized birth year was 1839.

Nothing is known about her emancipation, but she was most likely freed by the Emancipation Proclamation in 1863.

Most sources claim that she was of normal size until the age of twenty, at which point she gained an unusual amount of weight. It is uncertain if this is true.

== Performing career ==
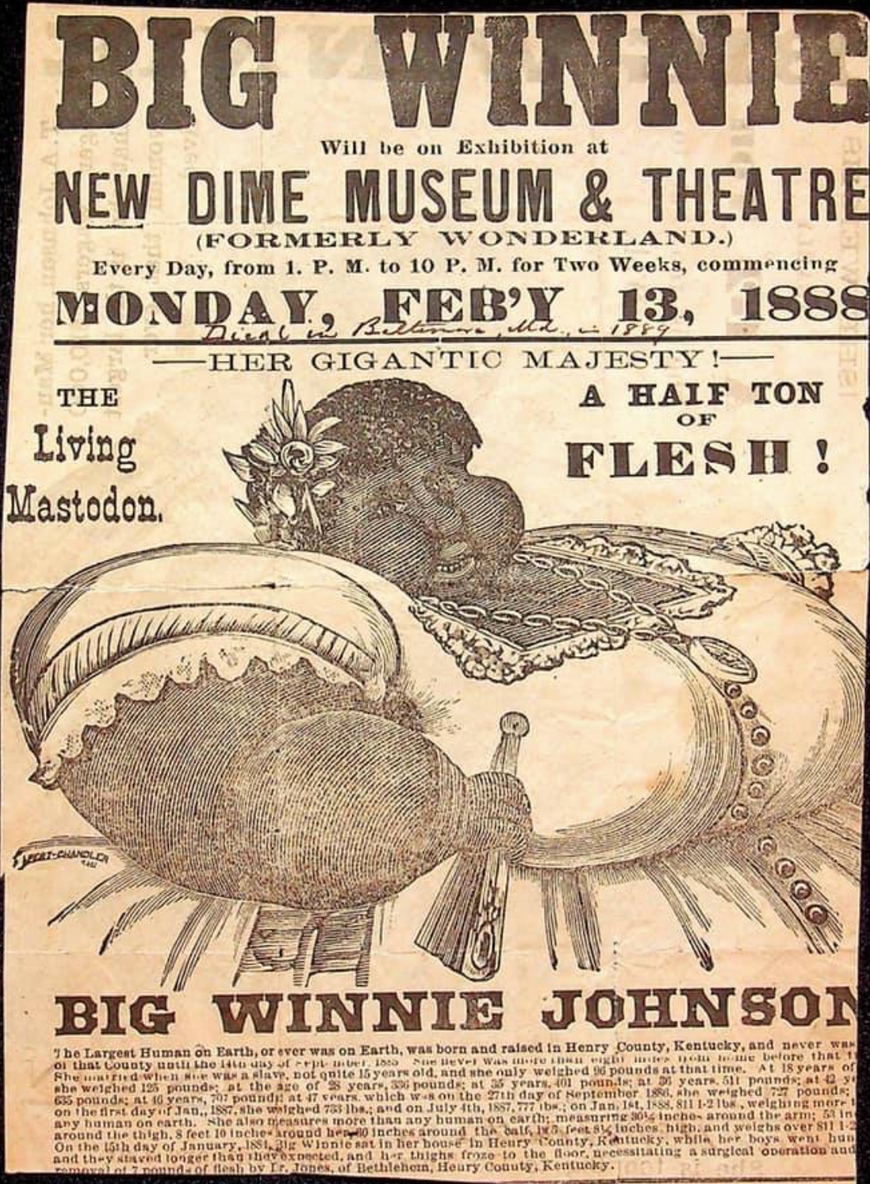
Advertisement for Big Winnie at the New Dime Museum & Theatre, Detroit, 1888

After Benjamin died in 1882, Winnie turned to the entertainment business to support herself and their children. Like other "Fat Lady" sideshow performers, she had her portrait taken in costume and sold carte-de-visite photographs which were purchased as souvenirs and helped to advertise her performances.

Johnson was said to be the "highest-salaried fat woman on the stage" and was usually reported being between 620 and 850 pounds. As advertised weights were a form of competition, she was often compared to other "Fat Lady" performers including Hannah Battersby and Ada Briggs.

In 1886, she visited Cincinnati. In 1887, she supposedly made $250/week working at a museum in Chicago, and in Indianapolis, 23,000 people attended her exhibitions. In 1887 and 1888 she worked at the Wonderland Theater in Detroit (later the New Dime Museum & Theatre), for the latter of which she performed for nine hours a day, two weeks straight (see image).

As Johnson was Black, she was sometimes compared to Millie and Christine McKoy, African-American conjoined twins who had also been born enslaved, but unlike her were sold into the sideshow business. She was not the only Black woman who chose to become a "Fat Lady" performer; Mrs. Eliza Sebastian ("Big Eliza," "The Kentucky Giantess"; d. 1892) also found relative success in the industry in her forties.

== Personal life ==
Around the age of fifteen, she married Benjamin Johnson, who was ten years her senior.

After emancipation, he found work as a farm laborer and she kept house; neither was literate. They had between five and ten children together, including Nancy, Simon, William, and John, and lived in the area of Lockport and Bethlehem, KY.

Johnson was able to take a vacation and visit her family in Kentucky in the summer of 1888 just before her death.

== Death ==
Johnson died in 1888 at her boarding house in Baltimore, Maryland, just before she exhibited at Johnson's Dime Museum (no relation). Her cause of death was reported to be fatty degeneration of the heart.

Like her contemporary Hannah Battersby, the size of her coffin was discussed intensely in the media. Called "as great an attraction in death as in life," it was reported that twenty pallbearers carried it down a street lined with hundreds of people before it was lowered into the ground with a derrick. She was interred in Baltimore's Laurel Cemetery.

Despite only spending approximately six years in the sideshow business, in the decades after her death she was frequently called "the most famous fat woman that ever lived," on par with or more popular than Battersby, whose career had lasted twenty years.
