= Excel Academy at Francis M. Wood High School =

Location
- 1001 West Saratoga Street; Baltimore, Maryland 21223; United States
- Coordinates: 39°17′32″N 76°38′5″W

Information
- School type: Public, Alternative, Adult
- Motto: "Engaging students toward Excellence"
- School district: Baltimore City Public Schools
- Superintendent: Sonja Brookins Santelises
- School number: 178
- Principal: Eugenia Young
- Grades: 9–12
- Enrollment: 574 (2018)
- Area: Urban
- Colors: Burgundy and Gray
- Mascot: Bear
- Team name: Bears

Excel Academy at Francis M. Wood High School is a public adult high school located in Baltimore, Maryland, United States and is part of the Baltimore City Public Schools. The school is named for Francis M. Wood, Baltimore's Director of Negro Schools from 1925 to 1943.

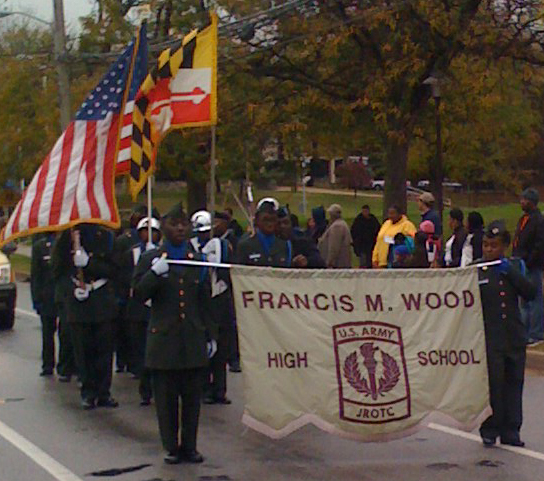
Francis M. Wood ROTC at the 2008 Morgan State University Homecoming Parade.
