= Grace Gerber Silverberg =

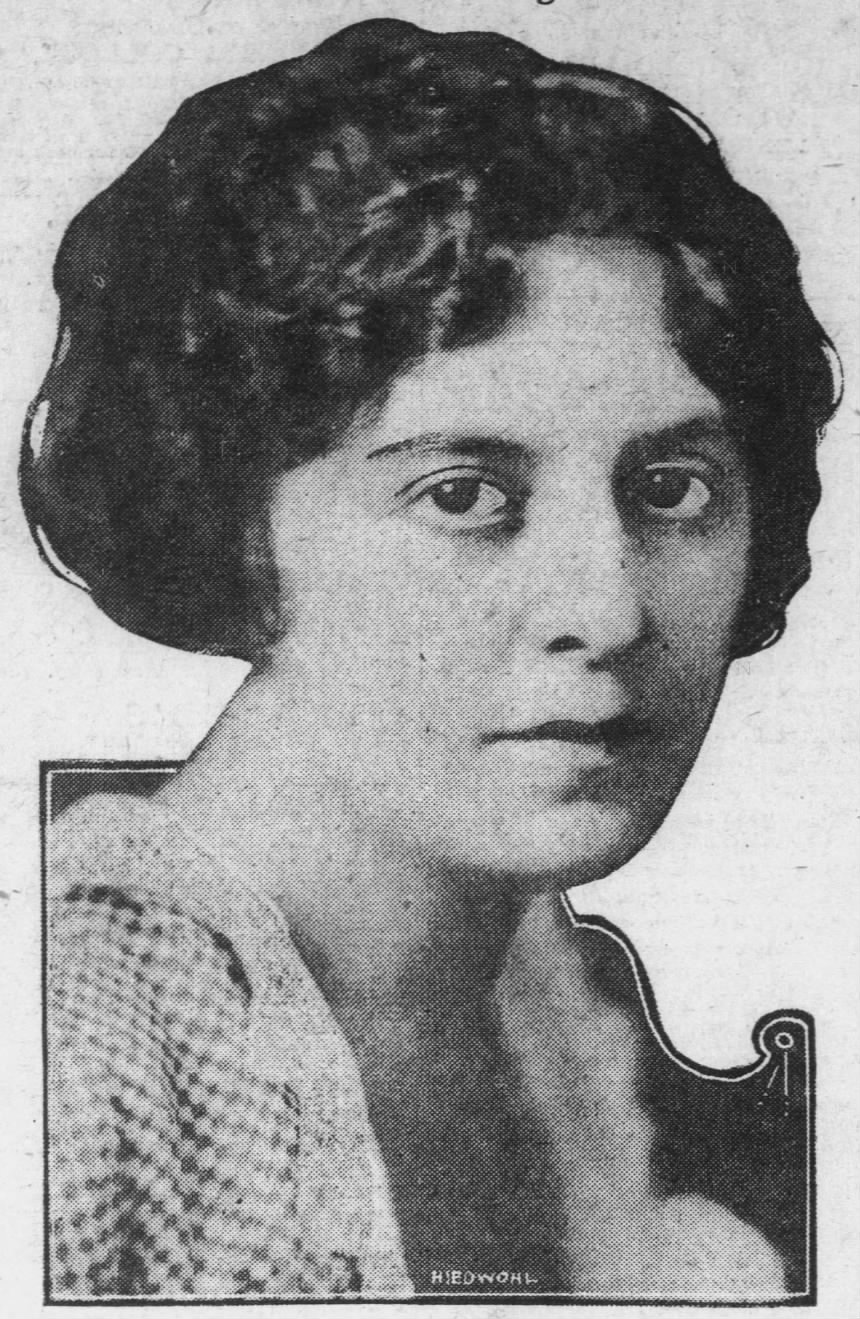
- Born: 1893
- Died: May 6, 1948; Cleveland
- Occupation: Lawyer

Grace Rebekah Gerber Silverberg (August 22, 1894 – May 6, 1948) was the first female Jewish lawyer to be admitted to the bar in Maryland, United States.

Grace Rebekah Gerber was the third of seven children of Julius (Judel) Gerber and Bessie Gerber. The Gerbers and their two eldest children fled Russia via South America for the United States and Grace Gerber was born during the journey. The Gerbers settled in Hagerstown, Maryland, which had a very small Jewish population, about 250.

In 1915, she graduated as valedictorian from Western Maryland College. Since the University of Maryland Law School barred women from attending at the time, she went to the Valparaiso University School of Law in Valparaiso, Indiana. One of only three women in a class of 105, she initially met with fierce hostility from male students before many of them realized they could rely on her study skills for tutoring. She graduated valedictorian in 1918.

In 1920, she was admitted to the bar in Maryland. She was the first Jewish woman and 8th woman admitted to the bar in the state. She was the first woman to practice law in Hagerstown and worked as a lawyer there into the mid-1940s. Most of her work involved divorce cases. In 1921, she unsuccessfully ran as a Republican to represent Washington County, Maryland in the Maryland House of Delegates.

Grace Rebekah Gerber Silverberg died on 6 May 1948 in Cleveland.

== Personal life ==
In 1930, she married lawyer Simon N. Silverberg. They had one child, Seth Samuel Gerber Silverberg.
