= Ada Copeland King =

Common-law wife of the American geologist Clarence King

Ada Copeland King (ca. 23 December 1860 – 14 April 1964) was the common-law wife of the American geologist Clarence King. Their thirteen-year relationship, with King posing as a black man named James Todd when they were together, was the subject of a substantial lawsuit and the book Passing Strange: A Gilded Age Tale of Love and Deception Across the Color Line by Martha Sandweiss.

== Biography ==
Copeland was presumed born a slave on or around 23 December 1860, in Georgia. As a young woman, she moved to New York in the mid-1880s and worked as a nursemaid. In about 1887, she became involved with Clarence King, an upper-class white man who presented himself to her as a light-skinned black Pullman porter under the name of James Todd. Given the long history of slavery in the United States, many African Americans had European ancestry. Some passed or identified as white, given their majority white ancestry. King said that he was West Indian and that he worked as a railroad porter, explaining why he was so frequently away, but also how he could support their family.

They married in a home ceremony in September 1888. King lived as James Todd while with her, but went by Clarence King while working in the field as a geologist. They had five children together, four of whom survived to adulthood. Their two daughters married white men. Their two sons served, classified as black during World War I. Before his death from tuberculosis in 1901, King wrote to Copeland from Arizona, confessing his true identity. He had said that he had left money in a trust for her, with his friend John Gardiner.

After King died, Copeland embarked on a thirty-year battle to gain control of the trust fund he had promised her. Her representatives included the notable lawyers Everett J. Waring, the first African-American lawyer to argue a case before the Supreme Court of the United States, and J. Douglas Wetmore, who contested segregation laws in Jacksonville, Florida. Eventually, in 1933, the court determined that King had died penniless, and no money was forthcoming.

John Hay, a friend of Clarence King's, provided Ada King with a monthly stipend. After his death in 1905, Hay's daughter Helen Hay Whitney continued the support. The stipend eventually stopped, though Copeland until her death continued to live in the house John Hay had bought for her, an 11-room house in Flushing, Queens.

King died on 14 April 1964, one of the last of the former American slaves.

== Bibliography ==
- Martha A. Sandweiss, Passing Strange: A Gilded Age Tale of Love and Deception across the Color Line (2009)
