= Emilie Doetsch =

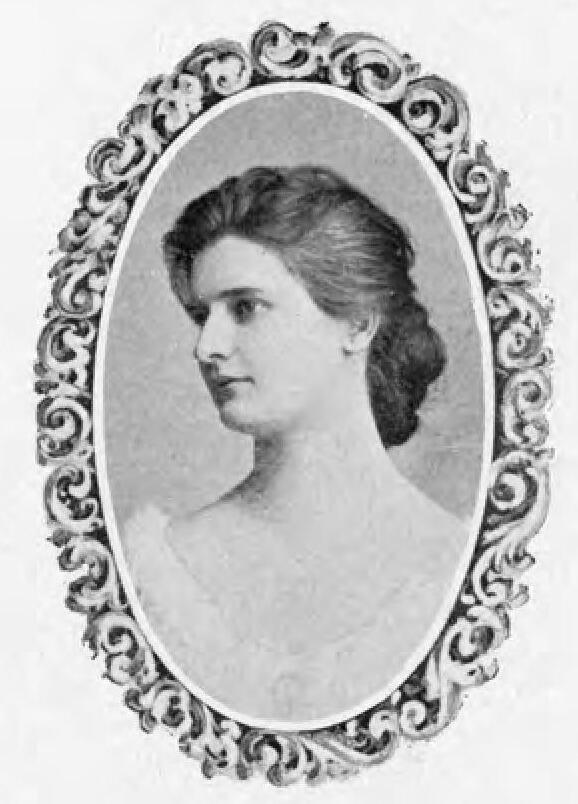
- Born: June 30, 1882; Roland Park
- Died: June 10, 1969 (aged 86); Baltimore
- Occupation: Suffragist, lawyer

Emilie A. Doetsch (June 30, 1882 – June 10, 1969) was an American lawyer and suffragist. She was the third woman to be admitted to the bar in the US state of Maryland and the second woman known to practice law in Maryland.

Emilie Doetsch was born on June 30, 1882 in Roland Park, Baltimore, the daughter of Louis John Doetsch, a German-American lithographer, and Johanna (Pohl) Doetsch. She attended Western High School and graduated from The Woman's College of Baltimore in 1903. She graduated from Baltimore Law School in June 1906, prior to the school banning women in 1907, and was admitted to the Maryland bar on January 29, 1907. (Doetsch is sometimes cited as the second woman to be admitted to the bar in Maryland. Doetsch was the second woman known to practice law in Maryland. There is no evidence that the second woman admitted to the bar in Maryland, Anna Grace Kennedy in 1906, ever practiced law.)

Initially unable to secure work as a lawyer, she became a journalist with the Baltimore News. An active suffragist, she participated in General Rosalie Jones' February 1913 suffragist march from New York City to Baltimore, braving winter weather and jeering crows while filing daily reports for the News. She was one of only 14 women to complete the entire 19-day, 240-mile march.

She became the first woman to run for the Baltimore City Council in 1923. She came in seventh in the race but received more votes than any other candidate from her party, the Citizens Independent League. She was finally able to practice law when, under Republican mayor William F. Broening, she was appointed Assistant City Solicitor in 1928, the first woman to hold a major post in Baltimore government. When Democrat Howard W. Jackson became mayor, she was ousted in 1932 and entered private practice.

Doetsch was active in numerous progressive organizations and causes. She was elected president of the Women's Bar Association of Baltimore. She was vice-chair of the Baltimore chapter of the National Woman's Party and served as managing editor of their newspaper, Equal Rights, from 1932-1934. In 1934, she failed to obtain a seat as a judge on the newly formed Juvenile Court despite strong public support. She also served as director of the board of the Children's Fresh Air Society. During the Great Depression, her law practice struggled, so she also worked as librarian for the Washington Times Herald.

Emilie Doetsch died on 10 June 1969 in Baltimore.
