= Audrey Carrion =

American judge (born 1958)

Member of the Eighth Circuit Court for Baltimore City
- Incumbent
- Assumed office November 10, 1999

Personal details
- Born: July 16, 1958 (age 67) New York City, U.S.
- Education: College of Notre Dame of Maryland (BA 1981); University of Baltimore (JD 1984)

Audrey J. S. Carrion (born July 16, 1958) is an American judge who has served as an associate judge on the Eighth Judicial Circuit in Baltimore since 1999, as that court's administrative judge as of 2020, and later as its chief judge.

== Early life and education ==
Carrion was born on July 16, 1958, in New York City. She graduated with a bachelor's degree from the Notre Dame of Maryland University in 1981, having earlier attended Colegio Espiritu Santo, Puerto Rico. She earned a Juris Doctor degree from the University of Baltimore School of Law in 1984.

== Judicial service ==
As of July 2024, Carrion is administrative judge and chief judge of the Circuit Court for Baltimore City. She has been Chair of Maryland's Conference of Circuit Judges since January 1, 2023 (as of July 2024). She first became an Associate Judge of the Circuit Court for Baltimore City in 1999. She headed the Family Division – Domestic from 2003 to 2009. Before becoming a circuit court judge, from 1996 to 1999, she was an associate judge in Maryland's state level District Court.

The Maryland Circuit Courts have a specialized business court program, the Business and Technology Case Management Program (BTCMP). Carrion was appointed to the Baltimore City Circuit Court's BTCMP in 2010, was its Director from 2012 to January 1, 2020, and remains a BTCMP judge (as of July 2024). She was a Business Court Representative to the American Bar Association's Business Law Section, and is a member of the American College of Business Court Judges.

== Personal life ==
Carrion is an outspoken lesbian and has supported LGBT rights throughout her career.

== Honors and awards ==
Carrion has received the following honors and awards;

- EBLO Jose Ruiz Achievement Award (2012)
- The Daily Record's Leadership in Law Award (2011)
- The Maryland Hispanic Bar Association Outstanding Achievement Award (2011)
- Women’s Law Center — Rosalyn B. Bell Award (2010)
- Excellence in Leadership Award, University of Baltimore, Women’s Bar Association (2008)
- The Daily Record's Maryland’s Top 100 Women (2000 and 2003)
- Alumna of the Year Award, University of Baltimore School of Law (1998)
- Presidential Award, Bar Association for Baltimore City (1998)
- Award of Achievement, Bar Association of Baltimore City, Young Lawyer’s Division (1993–94)

== See also ==
- List of Hispanic and Latino American jurists
- List of LGBT jurists in the United States
