= Mark Weiner =

American writer and legal scholar

Mark S. Weiner
- Occupations: writer, filmmaker, legal scholar

Mark S. Weiner is an American scholar, writer, and documentary filmmaker. He is the president of Hidden Cabinet Films and is the executive director of the Telos-Paul Piccone Institute. He was formerly a professor of constitutional law and legal history at Rutgers University School of Law—Newark.

Weiner is co-director of the feature-length documentary The Volunteers: Mountain Rescue Brings Us Home (2024). He is the author of The Rule of the Clan: What an Ancient Form of Social Organization Reveals about the Future of Individual Freedom (Farrar, Straus, and Giroux, 2013), Black Trials: Citizenship from the Beginnings of Slavery to the End of Caste (Alfred A. Knopf, 2004), and Americans without Law: The Racial Boundaries of Citizenship (New York University Press, 2006). He is co-editor of the exhibition catalogue Law's Picture Books: The Yale Law Library Collection (2017), which is based on a critically-acclaimed rare books exhibition at the Grolier Club in New York City.

The Rule of the Clan received the Grawemeyer Award for Ideas Improving World Order. Black Trials received the Silver Gavel Award of the American Bar Association for its contribution to the public understanding of law. Americans Without Law was awarded the Presidents Book Award from the Social Science History Association. Law's Picture Books received the Joseph L. Andrews Legal Literature Award from the American Association of Law Libraries.

Weiner has served as a Fulbright Scholar in Akureyri, Iceland; Salzburg, Austria; and Uppsala, Sweden. He received an A.B. from Stanford University, a J.D. from Yale Law School, and a Ph.D. in American Studies from Yale University. His website is Worlds of Law.

== Works ==
- Americans Without Law: The Racial Boundaries of Citizenship. New York University Press, New York City, NY. (ISBN 0-8147-9364-9)
- Black Trials: Citizenship from the Beginnings of Slavery to the End of Caste. Alfred A. Knopf, New York City, NY. ISBN 978-0-375-40981-3 (0-375-40981-5)
- The Rule of the Clan: What an Ancient Form of Social Organization Reveals about the Future of Individual Freedom. Farrar, Straus, and Giroux, New York, NY. ISBN 0-374-25281-5.
- Law's Picture Books: The Yale Law Library Collection. Talbott Publishers, Clark, New Jersey ISBN 978-1-616-19160-3
