= Harvey Johnson (reverend) =

African American pastor and activist

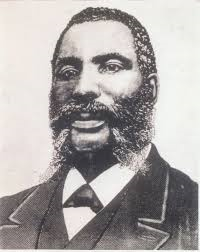
- Born: August 4, 1843; Fauquier County, Virginia
- Died: January , 1923; Baltimore, Maryland
- Burial place: Laurel Cemetery
- Occupation: Reverend
- Known for: Civil rights activism
- Spouse: Amelia E. Johnson

Religious life
- Religion: Baptist

Harvey Johnson (August 4, 1843 – January 1923) was a leading African American pastor, activist, and longtime leader of the Union Baptist Church during the 19th century and early 20th century.

== Personal life ==
Johnson was born in Fauquier County, Virginia to Harriet and Thomas Johnson, who were held in slavery and worked on a plantation. Once his parents were freed, they migrated to Alexandria, Virginia. Following the war, Alexandria's black population grew and a number of institutions were created. One that stood out in particular to Johnson and his parents was the Alfred Street Baptist Church.

Johnson completed four years of college and graduated from Washington, D. C.'s Wayland Seminary in 1868, with honors. He married writer Amelia E. Hall on April 17, 1877. She was an Afro-Canadian born in Montreal in 1868. Amelia met Reverend Harvey Johnson in Baltimore after her family had relocated to Baltimore in 1874. The two married a few years later. Amelia bore three children by Harvey, two sons, Harvey Jr. and Prentiss, and a daughter, Jessie E. They remained married until her death in the spring of 1922.

== Religious background ==
Growing up, Johnson was always highly involved in the church, so he focused on becoming a minister. Following college he began going around teaching the ministry. His time came in 1872 when Reverend William P. Thompson died at the age of thirty-two, and Johnson became the head of Baltimore Union Church. Since he became the pastor the church has gone from 250 members to 2200+ members. He served for the rest of his life (fifty years) until his death in January 1923. For Baltimore this marked the end of a leadership era.

== Professional career ==
He embarked on a career filed with spiritual and civil rights expansion, also serving the black community. He set his sights on gaining equality for all black ministers by raising their pay and growing the number of black people in Baptist churches. He accomplished this by creating many unions between other churches. To combat discrimination Johnson focused on economic independence and institutional autonomy. He did this by urging black congregations to break from the hold of white finances and break away from the Union Association.

== Civil rights involvement ==
Johnson owned and led a Union Baptist house. In the 1880s, he became one of the most important African American civil rights protectors. This was in the time where a wave of "redemption" came toward the South and the civil rights protections became lost. Some black people went to court, believing they had rights that shouldn’t be taken away. Johnson collected five Baptist colleagues in 1885. Among them was J.C. Allen of the First Baptist Church. Rev. Johnson called the meeting to put an end to the problem of not being treated fairly. He discussed the Reconstruction Era which resulted in the development of a civil rights organization called the Mutual United Brotherhood of Liberty of the United States (MUBL). This organization, run by Johnson, pledged "to use all legal means within our power to procure and maintain our rights as citizens of this our common country." Johnson encouraged attorney Everett J. Waring to move to Baltimore to represent the organization in 1886.

Two offices were established in 1885 of the MUBL, and a three-day conference was held on the black civil rights discussion. Frederick Douglass even attended the conference. Not only did Johnson found the MUBL, but also the Colored Baptist Convention of Maryland (1898). He came up with a plan to make progress in the racial issues in Baltimore known as the "Texas Purchase Movement". This movement called for separation of each races of the U.S. and blacks moving to Texas (the independent state).

== Contributions to the legal community ==
Johnson paved the way in the legal community by being a civil rights activist and helping a few law firms defend blacks who had had their rights taken away. The few law firms included the MUBL, established in the 1870s, that took on many cases of inequality. Johnson and the MUBL law firm took on cases that included the absence of black jury members, deterioration of black teachers from public city schools, and the dehumanizing codes effecting black women. The legal team helped over a hundred African Americans gain back their rights and equality. Johnson's efforts shaped the legal strategy of the lawyers in the MUBL, the NAACP, and Thurgood Marshall. The first public high school for coloured people built in America was called the Frederick Douglass Senior High School, located in West Baltimore.
