= Shirley M. Watts =

American judge (born 1959)

Shirley Watts
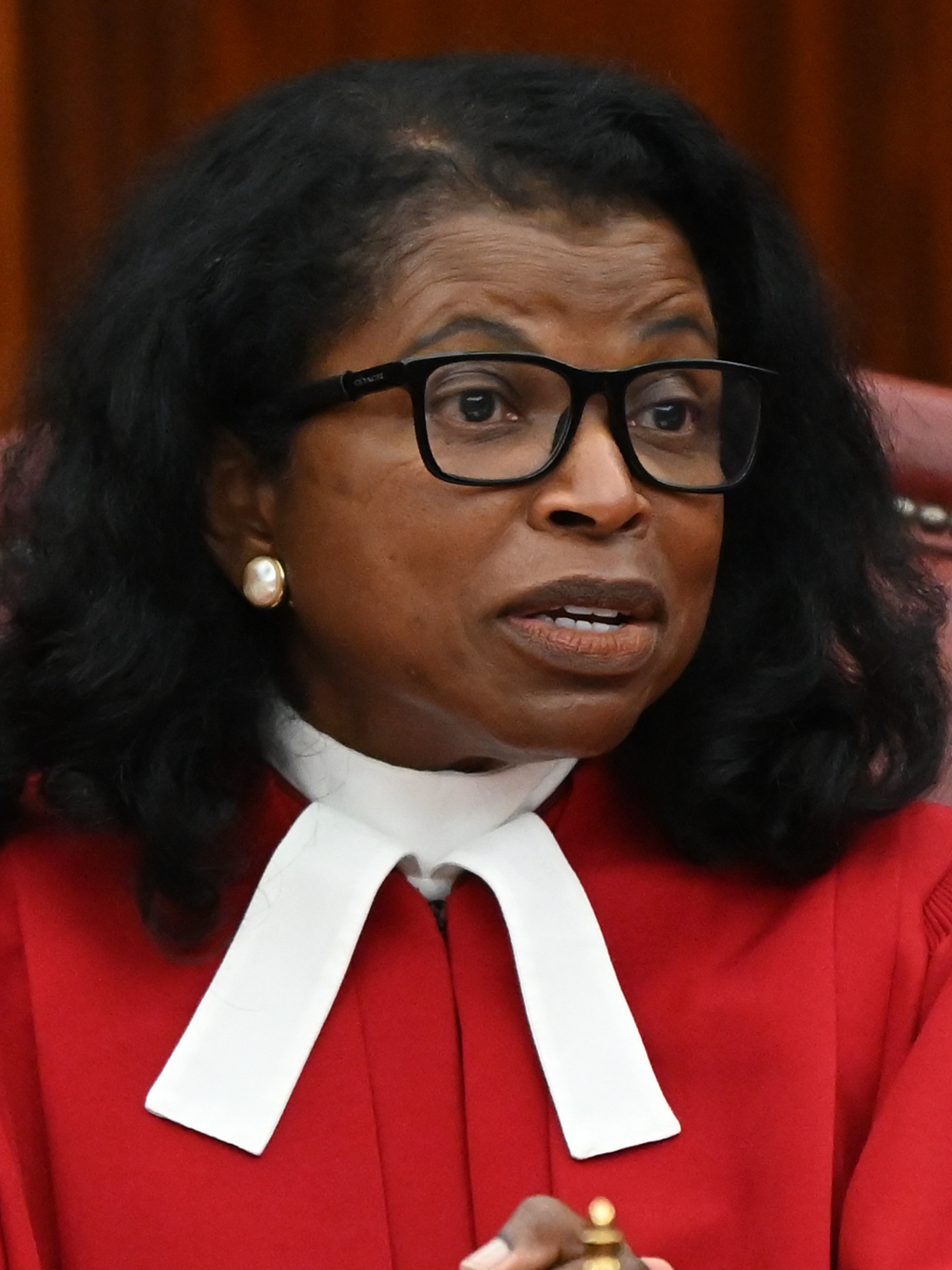

Justice of the Supreme Court of Maryland
- Incumbent
- Assumed office July 31, 2013
- Appointed by: Martin O'Malley
- Preceded by: Robert M. Bell

Judge of the Maryland Court of Special Appeals
- In office January 27, 2011 – July 31, 2013
- Appointed by: Martin O'Malley
- Preceded by: Arrie W. Davis
- Succeeded by: Michael Reed

Personal details
- Born: March 6, 1959 (age 67) Baltimore, Maryland, U.S.
- Education: Howard University (BA); Rutgers University, Camden (JD)

Shirley Marie Watts (born March 6, 1959) is an American lawyer and jurist from Baltimore, Maryland. Since July 2013, she has served as a Justice on the Supreme Court of Maryland, the state's highest court. Watts is the first African American woman to serve as a judge on the Court of Appeals. Prior to her appointment, she was a judge on the Maryland Court of Special Appeals from 2011 to 2013 and an associate judge on the Baltimore City Circuit Court from 2002 to 2011.

Born in Baltimore, Watts received her Bachelor of Arts degree from Howard University in 1980. She earned a Juris Doctor degree from Rutgers School of Law in 1983. On July 3, 2013, Governor Martin O'Malley nominated Watts to fill the seat of retired Chief Judge Robert M. Bell on the Court of Appeals, representing the 6th Appellate Circuit (Baltimore City).

Legal offices
| Preceded by Robert M. Bell | Judge of the Maryland Court of Appeals; 2013–present | Incumbent |
