= Union Baptist Church (Baltimore) =

Historic church in Maryland, United States

- U.S. National Register of Historic Places
- Baltimore City Landmark
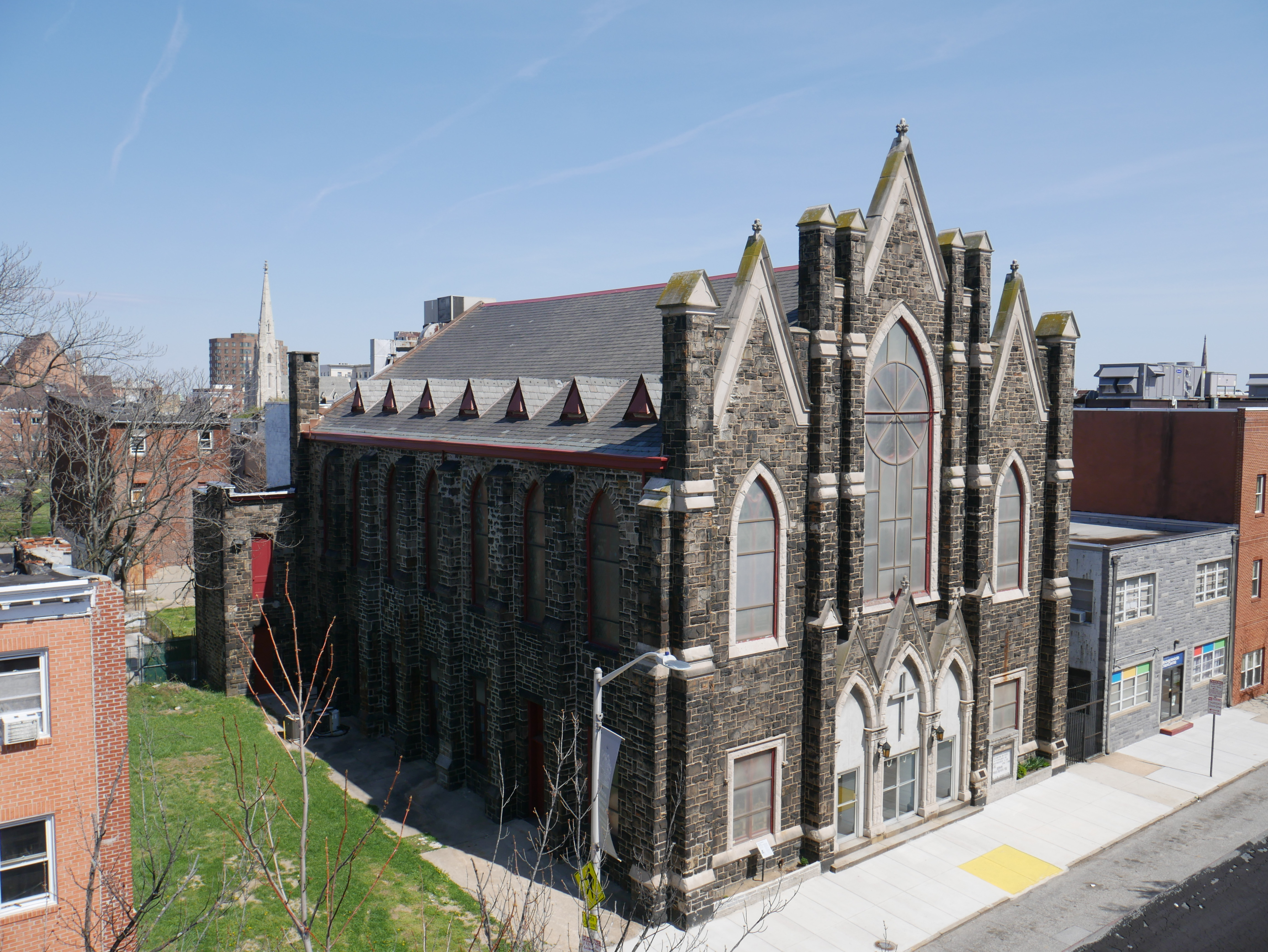
- Interactive map of Union Baptist Church
- Location: 1219 Druid Hill Ave., Baltimore City, Maryland
- Coordinates: 39°18′6″N 76°37′42″W
- Area: less than one acre
- Built: 1905
- Architect: Beardsley, William J.
- Architectural style: Late Gothic Revival
- NRHP reference No.: 09001173

Significant dates
- Added to NRHP: December 30, 2009
- Designated BCL: 2007

The Union Baptist Church is a historic Baptist church building located at 1219 Druid Hill Avenue in central Baltimore, Maryland. The granite church was designed by New York architect William J. Beardsley and built in 1905 under the leadership of Rev. Harvey Johnson. The Gothic Revival structure features steeply pitched roofs, lancet windows, and distinctive buttressing on the front facade to provide support for the walls on a constrained lot size. The church was built for a predominantly African-American congregation established in 1852; its minister from 1872 to 1923, Rev. Harvey Johnson, was a prominent voice in the civil rights movement.

The building was listed on the National Register of Historic Places in 2009.

== See also ==
- National Register of Historic Places listings in Central Baltimore
