= List of School Sisters of Notre Dame school alumni =

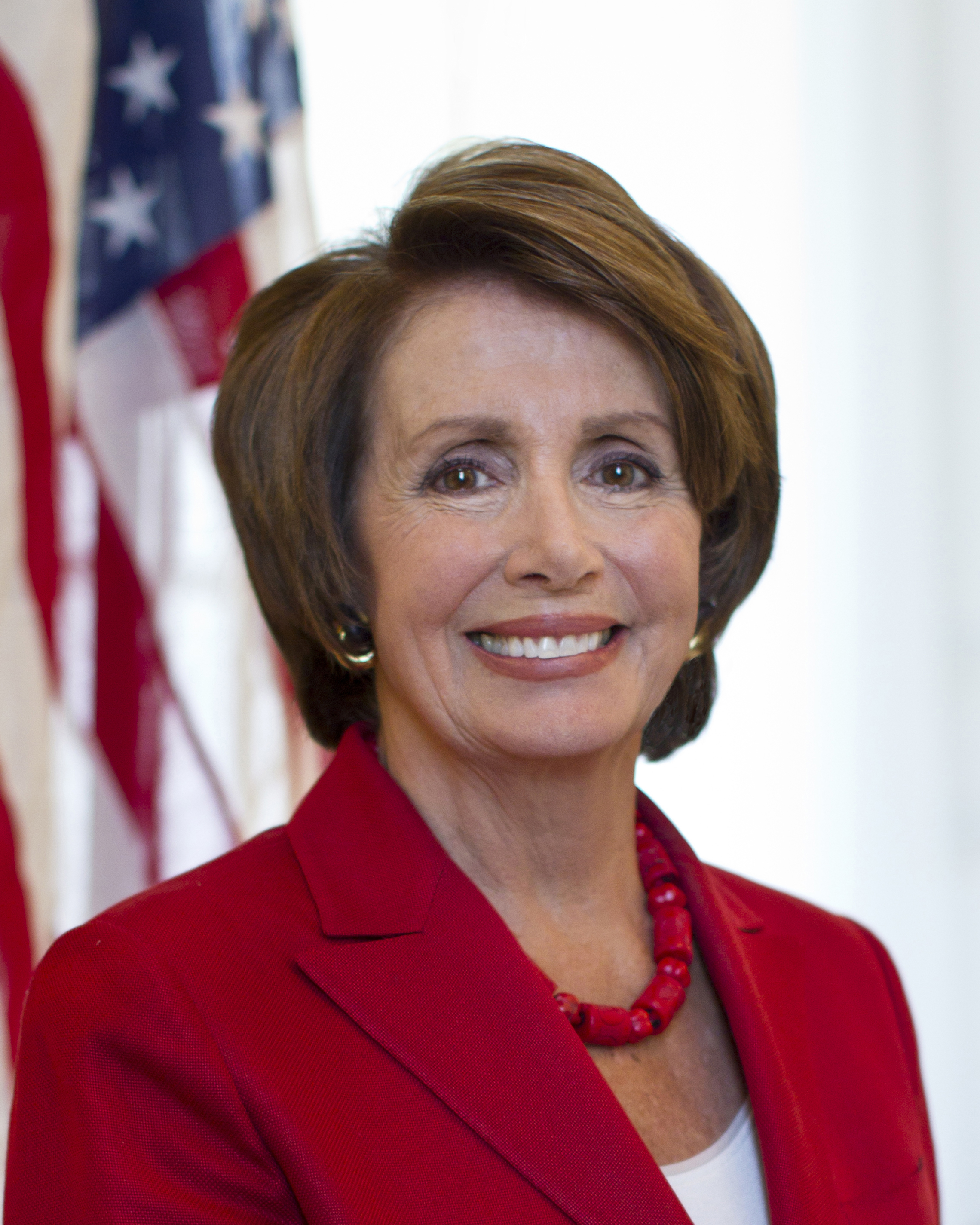
Nancy Pelosi, the first female speaker of the United States House of Representatives, was educated by the School Sisters of Notre Dame at the Institute of Notre Dame in Baltimore, Maryland.

This article is a list of School Sisters of Notre Dame school and college alumni.

The alumni are listed as follows:

- Name – occupation / significance – school

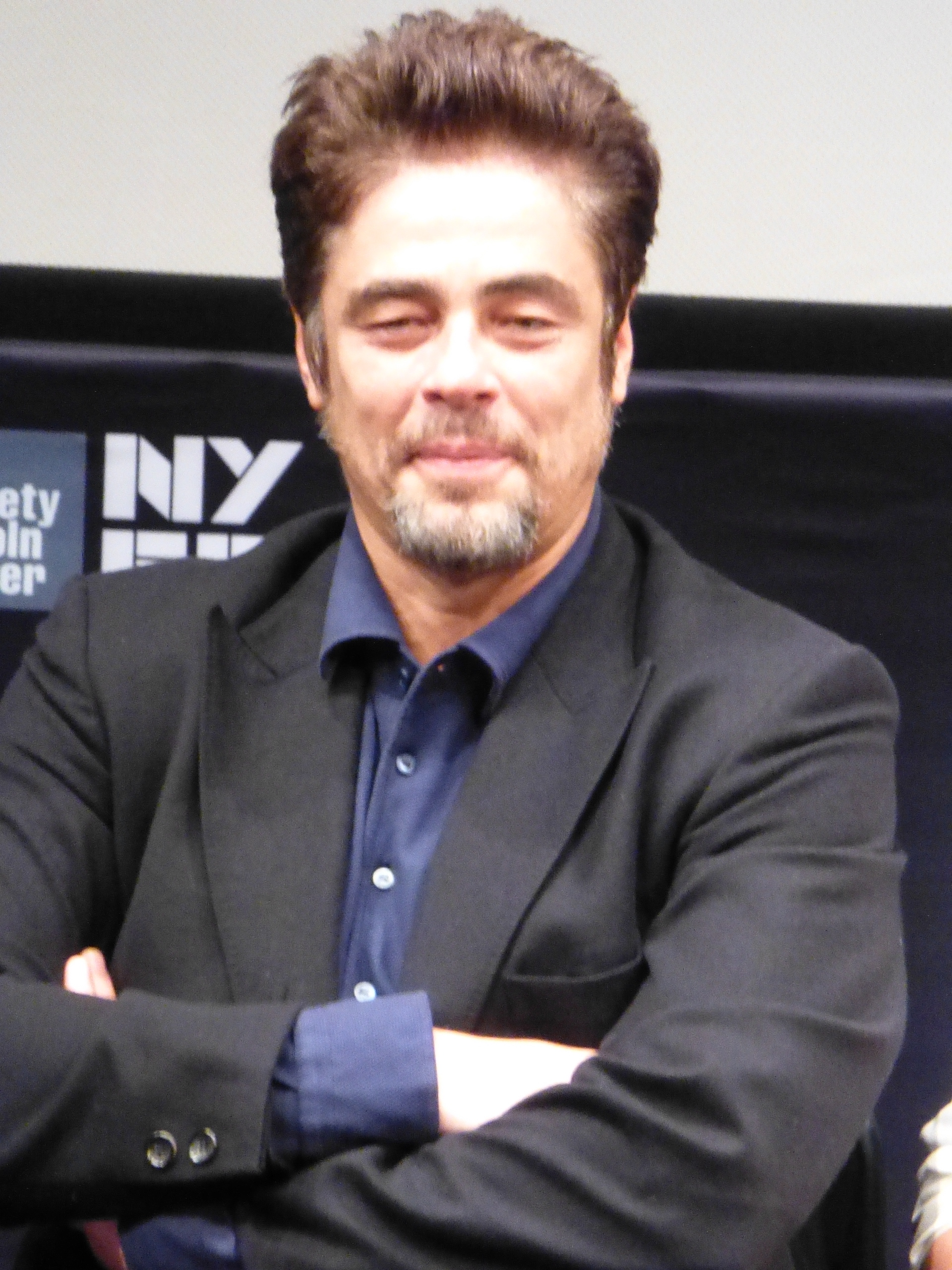
Puerto Rican-American actor and film producer Benicio del Toro was educated by the School Sisters of Notre Dame at the Academia del Perpetuo Socorro in San Juan, Puerto Rico.

== Arts and literature ==
- Cristina Córdova – Puerto Rican sculptor – Academia del Perpetuo Socorro
- Magali García Ramis – Puerto Rican writer – Academia del Perpetuo Socorro
- Frances Benjamin Johnston – American photographer and photojournalist – Notre Dame of Maryland Preparatory School '1883
- Lawrence La Fountain-Stokes – Puerto Rican-American author, scholar, and performer – Academia del Perpetuo Socorro
- Shelley Puhak – American poet – Notre Dame of Maryland University 1997
- Kit Reed – American author – Notre Dame of Maryland University 1954

== Education ==
- Laura Herz – German physics professor – Erzbischöfliche Liebfrauenschule Bonn

== Fashion and modeling ==
- Carolyn Mignini – American model and actress; Miss Teenage America 1965 – Institute of Notre Dame 1965
- Donna Ricco – fashion designer; designed a dress worn by Michelle Obama – Mount Mary University

== Law ==
- Audrey Carrion – American lawyer; first Hispanic woman elected to the Circuit Court of Baltimore City – Notre Dame of Maryland University 1981
- Gustavo Gelpí – Puerto Rican lawyer; U.S. district judge for the District of Puerto Rico – Academia del Perpetuo Socorro
- L. Paige Marvel – American lawyer; senior judge of the United States Tax Court – Notre Dame of Maryland University 1971
- Katie O'Malley – American lawyer and Maryland state judge; wife of Maryland Governor Martin O'Malley – Notre Dame Preparatory School
- Ana María Polo – Cuban American lawyer – Academia del Perpetuo Socorro
- Xavier Romeu – Puerto Rican lawyer and politician – Academia del Perpetuo Socorro

== Media, film and television ==
- Marisol Calero – Puerto Rican actress and singer – Academia del Perpetuo Socorro
- Henry Darrow – Puerto Rican-American stage and film actor – Academia del Perpetuo Socorro
- Benicio del Toro – Puerto Rican Academy Award- and Golden Globe Award-winning actor and film producer – Academia del Perpetuo Socorro
- Jenna Dewan – American actress and dancer – Notre Dame Preparatory School
- Josie de Guzman – Puerto Rican-American stage and television actress – Academia del Perpetuo Socorro
- Catherine Mackin – American two-time Emmy Award-winning journalist; NBC News reporter – Institute of Notre Dame 1956
- Trina Robinson – American Emmy Award-winning journalist and meteorologist – Notre Dame of Maryland University 1984
- Johanna Rosaly – Puerto Rican actress, singer, and television host – Academia del Perpetuo Socorro

== Military ==
- Elizabeth P. Hoisington – U.S. Army brigadier general – Notre Dame of Maryland University 1940

== Medicine ==
- Susan Love – American world-renowned breast cancer surgeon and best-selling author – Notre Dame of Maryland University 1970

== Music ==
- Roy Brown – Puerto Rican musician – Academia del Perpetuo Socorro
- Marta Cunningham – American singer and philanthropist – Notre Dame of Maryland Preparatory School '1887
- Gabriel Ríos – Puerto Rican musician – Academia del Perpetuo Socorro

== Politics and public service ==
- Susan L. M. Aumann – American politician; Maryland delegate – Notre Dame Preparatory School
- Robert C. Baldwin – American politician; Maryland delegate – St. Mary's High School
- Michael E. Busch – American politician; speaker of the Maryland House of Delegates – St. Mary's High School
- Thomas D'Alesandro, Jr. – American politician; former US representative representing Maryland; mayor of Baltimore 1947–1959 – St. Leo the Great School
- Barbara Mikulski – American politician; longest serving female US Senator; representing Maryland – Institute of Notre Dame 1954
- Nancy Pelosi – American politician; first female speaker of the US House of Representatives – St. Leo the Great School; Institute of Notre Dame 1958
- Pedro Rosselló – Puerto Rican politician and 7th governor of Puerto Rico – Academia del Perpetuo Socorro

== Science and technology ==
- Michael Collins – American Apollo 11 astronaut – Academia del Perpetuo Socorro

== Sports ==
- Annika Beck – German professional tennis player – Erzbischöfliche Liebfrauenschule Bonn 2011
- Chuck Bresnahan – American professional football coach; defensive coordinator for the Cincinnati Bengals – St. Mary's High School
- Henry Ciccarone – Hall of Fame-inducted professional lacrosse player and coach for Johns Hopkins – St. Mary's High School
- Jack Cornell – American professional football player for the Oakland Raiders – Quincy Notre Dame High School
- John Dorsey – American professional football player for the Green Bay Packers – St. Mary's High School
- Jim Finigan – Major League Baseball Player and 2-time All-Star – Quincy Notre Dame High School
- Chris Garrity – American professional lacrosse player for the Chesapeake Bayhawks – St. Mary's High School
- Caren Kemner – U.S. Olympic Volleyball Team captain and 1992 bronze medalist – Quincy Notre Dame High School
- Rebecca Meyers – United States Paralympian swimmer – Notre Dame Preparatory School
- D. A. Weibring – American professional golfer, currently playing on the Champions Tour – Quincy Notre Dame High School

== Other ==
- Yeardley Love – University of Virginia lacrosse player; murdered May 3, 2010 – Notre Dame Preparatory School
