= Marylou Yam =

American academic administrator

- Yam in 2016

14th President of Notre Dame of Maryland University
- Incumbent
- Assumed office July 1, 2014
- Preceded by: Joan Develin Coley (interim)

Personal details
- Born: 1957 or 1958 (age 68–69) New York City, U.S.
- Children: Mike Yam
- Education: Mercy College; Columbia University; Adelphi University

Marylou Yam (born c. 1958) is an American nurse, academic administrator, and researcher. She has served as the 14th president of Notre Dame of Maryland University (NDMU) since 2014. During her presidency, she has overseen the university's transition from an all-women's college to a co-educational institution, led its largest-ever fundraising campaign, and established Maryland's first programs in art therapy.

== Early life and education ==
Yam was born c. 1958 in The Bronx, New York, and spent much of her early life in New York City and New Jersey. She earned a bachelor's degree in nursing from Mercy College before receiving degrees in nursing education from Columbia University. She later completed a Ph.D. in nursing science at Adelphi University. Yam was a postdoctoral fellow at Johns Hopkins University, where she researched the impact of domestic violence on the mental health of women.

== Career ==
Yam is a licensed registered nurse. Her research interest in domestic violence was sparked by her work as a nurse treating victims. By December 1988, she was an assistant professor of nursing at Felician College. That same year, she was awarded a citation of merit by the New Jersey College and University Coalition of Women's Education for her work in developing a program focused on gender, race, and class in core curriculum. While at Felician College, Yam was recognized for developing an academic program titled "Gender, Race, Ethnicity, and Class: Considerations for the Core Curriculum."

In 1989, Yam began working at Saint Peter's University, where she would hold various positions over more than two decades. By 2002, she was the associate dean of nursing at what was then Saint Peter's College. The same year, Yam helped announce two new programs designed to advance the education of registered nurses, including a "bridge" program for nurses with undergraduate degrees in fields other than nursing.

She later held roles including dean of the Saint Peter's University's College of Arts and Sciences and School of Business Administration, eventually becoming provost and vice president for academic affairs. As vice president in 2013, she commented on rising student debt, stating that the average of nearly $30,000 could put college "'out of reach' for many families." During her tenure, Yam played a role in Saint Peter's transition from a college to a university. She initiated the university's first two doctoral programs, expanded graduate offerings, added new majors, launched an online program, and oversaw a rise in enrollment.

=== Notre Dame of Maryland University ===
Notre Dame of Maryland University (NDMU) announced on March 20, 2014, that Yam would become its 14th president. She assumed the office on July 1, 2014. In 2022, Yam led the 130-year-old historically all-women's undergraduate college through its transition to admit male students. Following this change, the university experienced a "dramatic increase in enrollment". Yam also guided the university through its largest-ever fundraising campaign, which raised $52.6 million, and saw its endowment grow by 40% to approximately $52.3 million.

Under her leadership, NDMU established several new academic programs. The university created NDMU Online, a fully remote degree option, and launched Maryland's first bachelor's and master's programs in art therapy. Yam also directed the acquisition of the former Maryland University of Integrative Health, creating the School of Integrative Health at NDMU. This made Notre Dame of Maryland the first comprehensive university in the United States with a school dedicated solely to integrative health, a move expected to add 500 students and increase the graduate population by nearly 50%.

On October 22, 2025, after 12 years as president, Yam announced she would retire. Her retirement was effective June 30 of the following year.

== Personal life ==
Yam is married to David Yam, a cytology manager at Beth Israel Medical Center in Newark, New Jersey. They have one son, Michael Yam, who is a sports broadcast journalist in San Francisco.
