= Puerto Rico Industrial Incentives Fund =

A controversial $160 million investment fund created by the Pedro Rossello administration to promote economic development. The PRIIF was funded by U.S. companies operating under Section 936 of the federal tax code in exchange for not paying approximately $960 million in tollgate tax obligations to Puerto Rico.

Xavier Romeu was the President of the PRIIF from April 1999 to December 2000 and held two of three seats on the Fund's Board of Directors.

== Sources ==
- Comisión Independiente de Ciudadanos para Evaluar Transacciones Gubernamentales
- PUERTO RICO HERALD: Blue Ribbon Finds Pridco Misused Public Funds…
- PUERTO RICO HERALD: Calderon Urged To Approve Plan For Vieques
- PUERTO RICO HERALD: Blue Ribbon Finds Pridco Misused Public Funds…
