= William McDaniel =

William McDaniel may refer to:

- William McDaniel (politician) (1801–1866), U.S. Representative from Missouri
- William J. McDaniel (born 1943), United States Navy admiral
- William Roberts McDaniel (1861–1942), academic and namesake of McDaniel College
