= Josep Codina =

Josep Codina may refer to:

- Josep Anton Codina Olivé (1932–2021), Spanish theater director
- Josep Dallerès Codina (born 1949), Andorran politician
- Josep Feliu i Codina (1845–1897), Catalan journalist, novelist and playwright
