= Kathleen Feeley =

American educator (born 1929)

Sister Kathleen Feeley S.S.N.D.
- Born: January 7, 1929 (age 97); Baltimore, Maryland, U.S.
- Occupation: Educator
- Awards: Maryland Women's Hall of Fame

Academic background
- Education: Notre Dame of Maryland University (BA); Villanova University (MS); Rutgers University (PhD)
- Thesis: 'Flannery O'Connor: Voice of the Peacock' (1972)

Kathleen Feeley (born January 7, 1929) is a former president of the College of Notre Dame of Maryland.

== Early life ==
Kathleen Feeley was born on January 7, 1929, in Baltimore, Maryland, one of seven children. Feeley graduated from the Notre Dame Preparatory School and joined the School Sisters of Notre Dame. She received a Bachelor of Arts in English from the College of Notre Dame of Maryland in 1962. Feeley then received a Master of Science in English from Villanova University in 1964 and a PhD in English from Rutgers University in 1970. She published her doctoral thesis at Rutgers in 1972, entitled Flannery O'Connor: Voice of the Peacock, about the author Flannery O'Connor who she saw speak at the College of Notre Dame. It would be published as a paperback in 1982.

== Career ==
=== Early career ===
Feeley was a fellow at the Institute for the Study of Change at Claremont University Center (now Claremont Graduate University). She was an American Council on Education intern in 1970/1971.

=== College of Notre Dame ===
Feeley became president of the College of Notre Dame of Maryland on July 1, 1971. At the time, many Catholic colleges for women were merging with colleges for men or becoming coeducational. Feeley led the process to determine what the College of Notre Dame would do.

Under Feeley's leadership, the college allowed part-time students and started the second Weekend College in the nation in 1975. In 1984, the college began to offer graduate degrees. In 1989, she founded the Renaissance Institute at the college. She served as president for 21 years and retired in 1992.

In 1999, she returned to the College of Notre Dame as a professor of English.

=== Later career ===
In 1994, Feeley worked with the School Sisters of Notre Dame to raise money to renovate a building in Baltimore and found the Caroline Center, a religious institute focused on helping women with job readiness, skill training and support.

In 1995, Feeley was appointed by Baltimore mayor Kurt Schmoke to serve as Administrator for Special Education for Baltimore City Public Schools. A lawsuit had been filed against the city and her task was to bring the city in compliance with special education law. She formed a unique city and state educational partnership that is considered as a model across the United States. She remained in the role until 1997.

Feeley also served as a Fulbright professor of English at the University of Madras in India from 1992 to 1993 and the Fudan University in Shanghai, China from 1998 to 1999. She was a visiting professor at the Australian Catholic University from 1993 to 1994 and the University of Maryland, Baltimore County from 1997 to 1998.

She was the first female professor at the Catholic University of Ghana in Sunyani, Ghana. She was professor there from 2003 to 2010. In May 2010, she was asked to serve as the interim president of the Institute of Notre Dame and left Ghana for Baltimore. She remained in that role until July 1, 2011, when Mary Funke was appointed.

== Awards and legacy ==
- 2001, Maryland Women's Hall of Fame inductee
- 2002, Lifetime Achievement Award, The Caroline Center
- 2003, Maryland Top 100 Women, Daily Record, Baltimore, Maryland
- 2020, Albert Nelson Marquis Lifetime Achievement, Marquis Who's Who

In 1991, the College of Notre Dame named the Sister Kathleen Feeley International Center after Feeley. The center is a laboratory for language and culture.
