= Mike Yam =

American host

- Occupations: Host, sports journalist
- Mother: Marylou Yam

Mike Yam is an American studio host for the NFL Network and author of the children's book Fried Rice and Marinara. Previously, he was hired to be the lead studio host for the Pac-12 Network where he worked from 2012 to 2020. Prior to his arrival at Pac-12, he was an ESPN anchor from October 2008 through August 2012.

During Yam's time at ESPN, he could be seen anchoring SportsCenter, as well as hosting college football live and college basketball final. Since July 2011, he can be heard filling in on various shows on 1050 ESPN, New York City. Yam was also the cohost of ESPN's Fantasy Focus Basketball podcast with Keith Lipscomb.

From 2006-2008, Yam was the co-host of The Mike and Murray Show, heard daily on Sirius Satellite Radio, and also hosted NBA Radio's Full Court Press. Previously, he was a host of the Phil Jackson Show. Additionally, Mike was heard on ESPN Radio as the host of Fantasy Focus. Outside of his radio work, Mike served as an anchor for NBA TV's Game Night and host of Fantasy Hoops.

Before ascending to his current posts, Yam was the host of The Desk on Sirius and an anchor at College Sports Television (CSTV) where he provided daily sports updates for the network.

Yam started his broadcasting career at WFUV hosting One on One, (New York's longest- running sports call-in show) and covering the New York Knicks and Mets, where he followed in the footsteps of many great broadcasters who got started at WFUV. Following his run at WFUV, Yam worked as a correspondent for FOX Sports before coming to Sirius Satellite Radio.

Yam is a graduate of Fordham University, and the recipient of the Marty Glickman Award for Excellence in Play-by-Play Broadcasting.

Outside of his work Yam is also a member of the Alzheimer's Association of New York. Joe Girardi's Catch 25 Foundation awarded him the Joan Pasheluk Tribute Award for raising awareness of Alzheimer's in the media. He also has written about social causes.
