= Mary Pat Seurkamp =

Mary Patricia Seurkamp is the former president of Notre Dame of Maryland University from 1997 until her retirement in 2012. She is the first layperson to lead the school. The College (CNDM) was the first Roman Catholic college or university in the U.S. to open its doors to women seeking a baccalaureate degree.

Seurkamp led Notre Dame through a strategic planning process which reaffirmed CNDM's commitment to the education of women. Under her leadership, the institution unveiled its first doctoral program, in education, and created a school of pharmacy. In recognition of the new complexity, CNDM was rechristened Notre Dame of Maryland University in 2011. She represents the College on national and local boards. Before her arrival at Notre Dame, Seurkamp served at St. John Fisher College in Rochester, New York for 21 years.

She graduated from Webster University in 1968 with a B.A. degree in psychology, from Washington University in St. Louis in 1969 with an M.A. in guidance and counseling, and from the State University of New York at Buffalo in 1990 with a Ph.D. in higher education.

== Previous professional background ==
- St. John Fisher College, Rochester, New York:
- 1996-1997: Vice-President for Institutional Planning & Research
- 1994-1996: Vice President for Academic Services & Planning
- 1992-1994: Acting Vice President for Academic Affairs/Dean of the College
- 1988-1992: Associate Vice President for Academic Affairs/Director of Student Academic Services

== Affiliations ==
Seurkamp served on the SunTrust Regional Advisory Board and the SunTrust Mid-Atlantic Board of Directors.
