= Harrison Stanford Martland =

American pathologist (1883–1954)

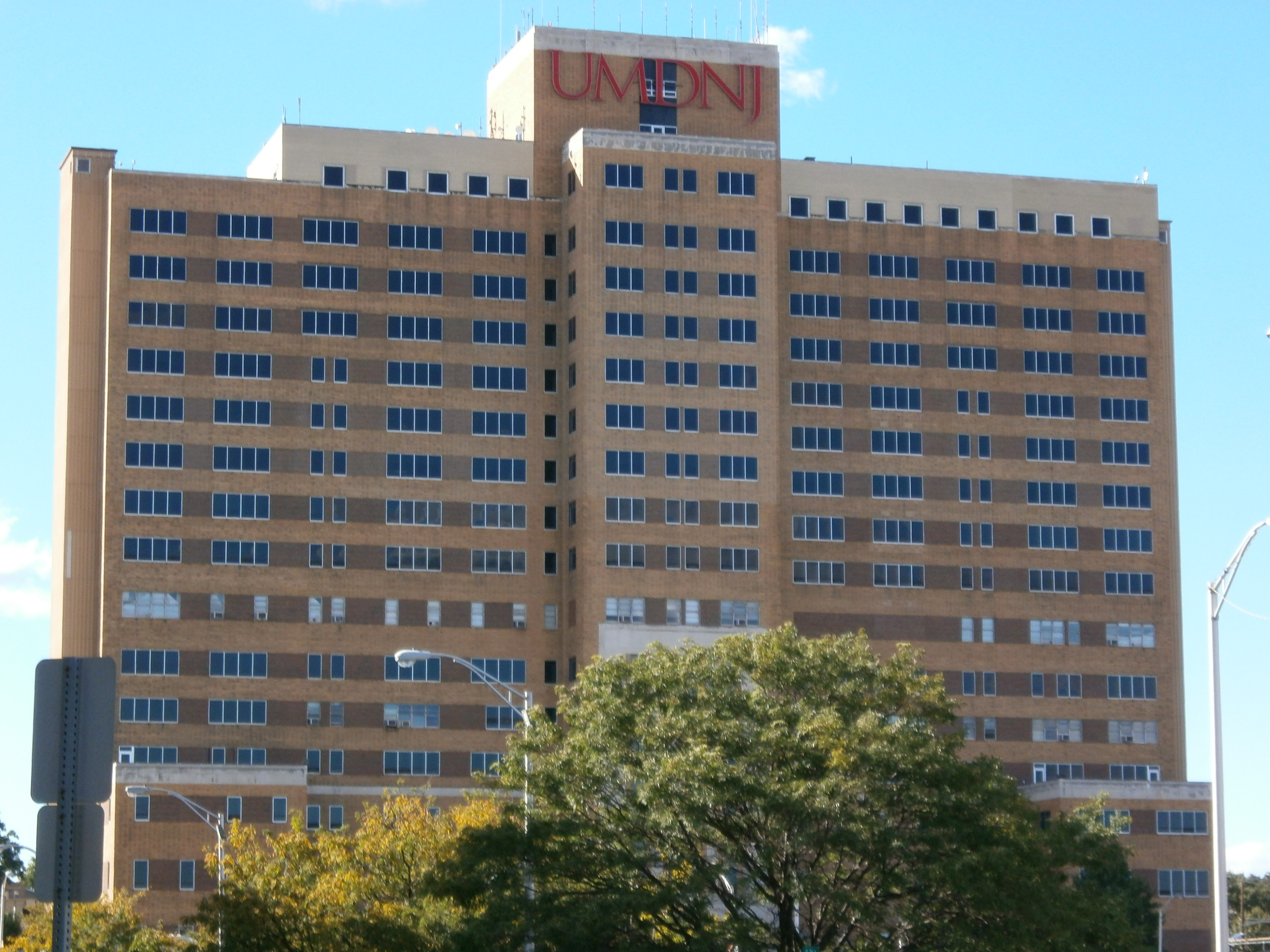
The new building of the Newark City Hospital was named the Martland Medical Center and is now part of Rutgers University

Harrison Stanford Martland (September 10, 1883 – May 1, 1954) was an American pathologist who identified radium as the cause of cancer and death among watch dial painters, and also coined the term punch drunk to describe chronic head injuries from boxing.

== Early life and education ==
Martland was born in Newark, New Jersey. In 1901 he received a BS degree from Western Maryland College and in 1905 he received his MD degree from Columbia University College of Physicians and Surgeons.

== Career ==
Martland accepted the appointment of the first full-time paid pathologist at the Newark City Hospital in January 1909. When World War I broke out, Martland joined the Bellevue Hospital Unit and as a lieutenant colonel he took charge of a hospital in Vichy, France. He later was awarded a Citation for Exceptionally Meritorious and Conspicuous Service by General John Pershing.

In June 1925, Martland was chosen to fill the post of Essex County Physician. He set out to establish the medical examiner system in Essex County. He was appointed Chief Medical Examiner by the Essex County Board of Freeholders. In April 1933, he was named Professor of Forensic Medicine at New York University, a post he held for fifteen years.

Martland made important contributions in the fields of pathology and forensic medicine. The work that attracted the most attention was his research begun in 1924, on the effects of radioactive material on the human body. Martland determined that minute traces of radioactivity contained in luminous paint had caused the deaths of watch dial painters employed at the US Radium Corporation in Orange, NJ. The Atomic Energy Commission (AEC) credits Dr. Martland's work with having made it possible for atomic development to proceed with comparative safety. At the request of the AEC, Martland prepared a permanent exhibit on radioactive dangers and precautions which is on display in Oak Ridge, Tennessee. In 1916, Martland alerted dynamite manufacturers to the dangers of occupational poisoning in TNT.

It was Martland who proved, back in 1928, that "punch drunk" prize fighters were suffering from a brain injury caused by the rupture of blood vessels. He did notable work in phases of cardiac syphilis and in the effects of bullet wounds on the body. Martland's accomplishments also included the first paper establishing the lethal effects of beryllium poisoning, which led to implementation of regulatory reforms governing the use of beryllium in industrial plants.

== Honors ==
Nobel Prize winners came to Newark three times to salute him at annual Harrison S. Martland Lectures sponsored by the Essex County Anatomical and Pathological Society, the first of which was delivered on December 14, 1935, The New York Pathological Association named him its first out-of-state president in 1928. He was President of the Essex County Medical Society in 1920 and of the Academy of Medicine of Northern New Jersey in 1922. In 1943, the Academy of Medicine gave Martland the Edward J. Ill Award as the outstanding physician and citizen of the county. The Newark City Commission paid tribute to the eminent pathologist when the new city hospital was dedicated the Harrison S. Martland Medical Center on January 24, 1954.

== Personal life ==
On November 16, 1910, he married Myra C. Ferdon and they purchased a house at 180 Clinton Avenue, Newark, which was to be their home until his death in 1954. After forty-five years as Newark City Hospital Pathologist and twenty-five years as Essex County Medical Examiner, Martland retired in November 1953. He died on May 1, 1954, at the age of 70.

His papers are part of the New Jersey Medical History Archives and Manuscript Collections at George F. Smith Library of the Health Sciences, Rutgers University.
