= Mercy High School (Baltimore, Maryland) =

School in Baltimore

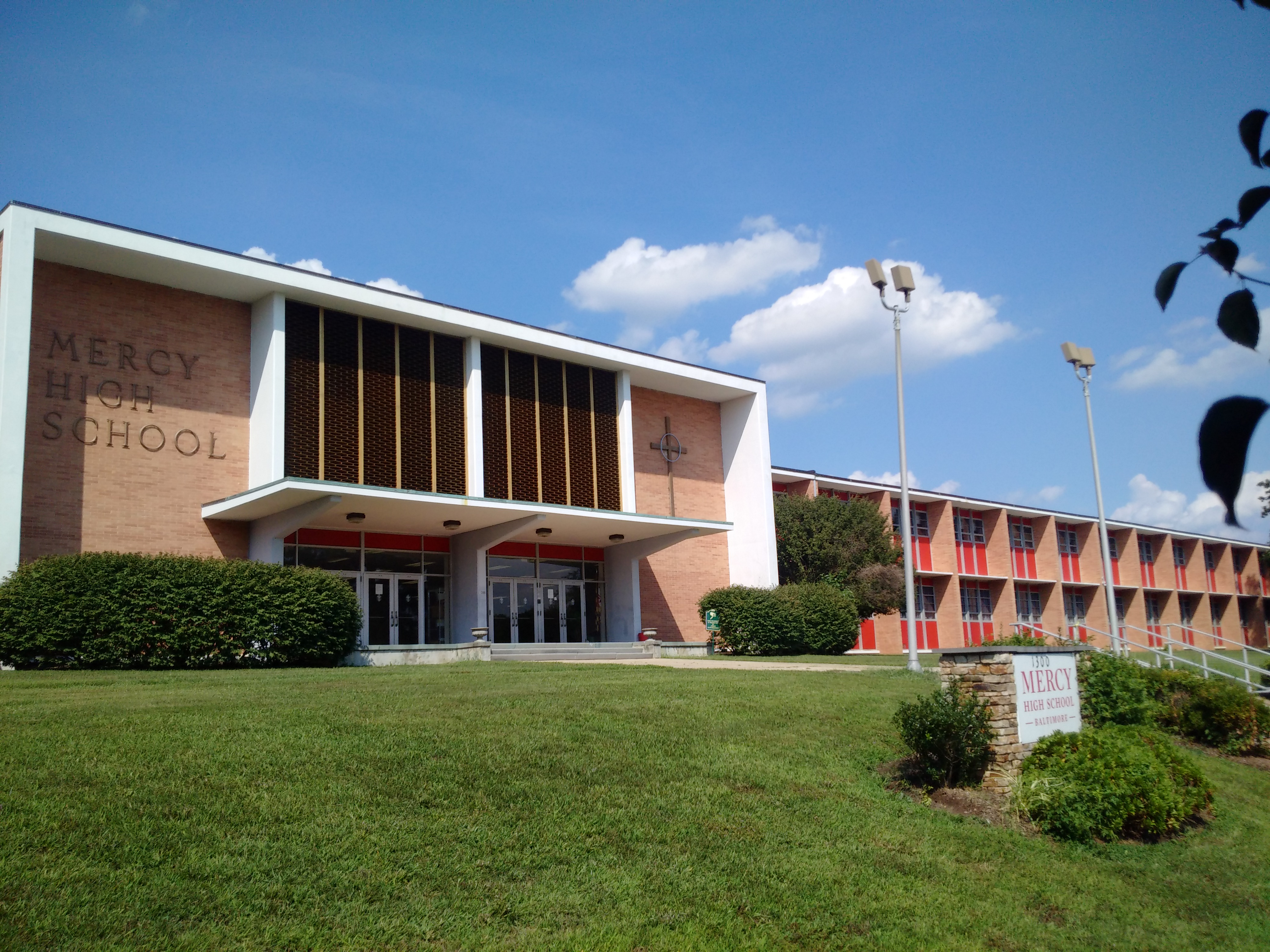

Location
- 1300 East Northern Parkway; Baltimore, Maryland 21239; United States; 39°22′2″N 76°35′23″W

Information
- Type: Private, All-Female
- Religious affiliation: Roman Catholic
- Patron saint: Our Lady of Mercy
- Established: September 26, 1960
- Status: Open
- Oversight: Sponsored by the Sisters of Mercy of the Americas
- President: Mary Beth Lennon '85
- Principal: Kathryn Adelsberger, Ed.D.
- Grades: 9–12
- Enrollment: 446
- Average class size: 15-25
- Campus size: 26 acres
- Campus type: suburban
- Colors: Red and white
- Athletics conference: IAAM
- Sports: basketball, field hockey, lacrosse, volleyball, softball, soccer, track, cross country, golf, tennis
- Mascot: magic top hat with rabbit
- Team name: Mercy Magic
- Accreditation: Middle States Association of Colleges and Schools
- National ranking: 1,547
- Newspaper: The Shield
- Yearbook: The Garnet
- Tuition: $17,180
- Website: www.mercyhighschool.com

Mercy High School is a private and independent Catholic high school for girls sponsored by the Sisters of Mercy and is located within the Archdiocese of Baltimore on a 26-acre campus at 1300 East Northern Parkway in Baltimore, Maryland. It is the only Catholic girls' school in Baltimore City with playing fields onsite.

== History ==
Founded in 1960, Mercy High School is located on a 26-acre campus in Northeast Baltimore. Opened at the request of the Archbishop of Baltimore who saw a need for a large, modern, centrally located Catholic high school for girls, Mercy High School was established in anticipation of the entrance of the first wave of baby boomers born in 1946. More than 300 students entered Mercy as freshmen in 1960. Today, students from more than 69 ZIP codes throughout Central Maryland and Southern Pennsylvania attend Mercy.

== Accreditation and Sponsorship ==
Mercy is an International Baccalaureate World School authorized to offer the Middle Years Programme and the Diploma Programme . The school is a member of the Association of Independent Maryland & DC Schools (AIMS) and the Mercy Education System of the Americas (MESA), the network of schools under the auspices of the Institute of the Sisters of Mercy of the Americas.

== Athletics ==
The Mercy Magic compete in the Inter-Scholastic Athletic Association (IAAM). Mercy offers 17 IAAM teams in 12 different sports that compete against many of the toughest teams in the state. Both the Varsity Basketball and Varsity Lacrosse teams won the IAAM "B" Conference Championships in the 2021-2022 school year, with Varsity Softball finishing runner-up in their IAAM "B" Conference Championship. Nike is providing uniforms for athletes in the 2022-2023 school year.

Mercy's longest sports rivalry was with the now-closed Institute of Notre Dame (IND), a Catholic girls' high school that was sponsored by the School Sisters of Notre Dame. Each year since 1961 the two schools' basketball teams played in a match-up known to fans simply as "The Game." It was the best-attended high school girls' sporting event in the state of Maryland. When "The Game" ended in 2019, the series stood at Mercy 30, IND 23. In February 2022, a new basketball rivalry with Maryvale Preparatory School was established. Mercy won the first game, taking home the Rita Sloan Berndt Memorial Trophy, named in memory of a distinguished IND alumna.

In September 2019, the school inaugurated its new $4.3 million Sisters of Mercy Athletic Complex. The lighted, AstroTurf field has a digital video scoreboard with bleachers and seating area accommodating up to 2,000 fans, for use by the school's soccer, field hockey, and lacrosse teams.

Mercy's school colors are red and white, and the magician and rabbit serve as mascots.

== Student life ==
Mercy has 34 clubs and students organizations, including Asian Student Union, Black Student Union, Craft Club, Ethics Team, Model Diplomats, Peer Ministry, and Social Justice Society.

== Beatlemania ==
On September 14, 1964, George Harrison visited Mercy the day after the Beatles played a concert in the city. A plaque placed above the fountain from which he drank from says Harrison’s visit was “the only known visit by a member of the group to an American high school during the height of Beatlemania.” Frank Lidinsky, who commissioned the plaque, verified the information by email with Beatles historian, Mark Lewisohn.

== See also ==
- National Catholic Educational Association
