= Josep Anton Codina Olivé =

Spanish theatre director (1932–2021)

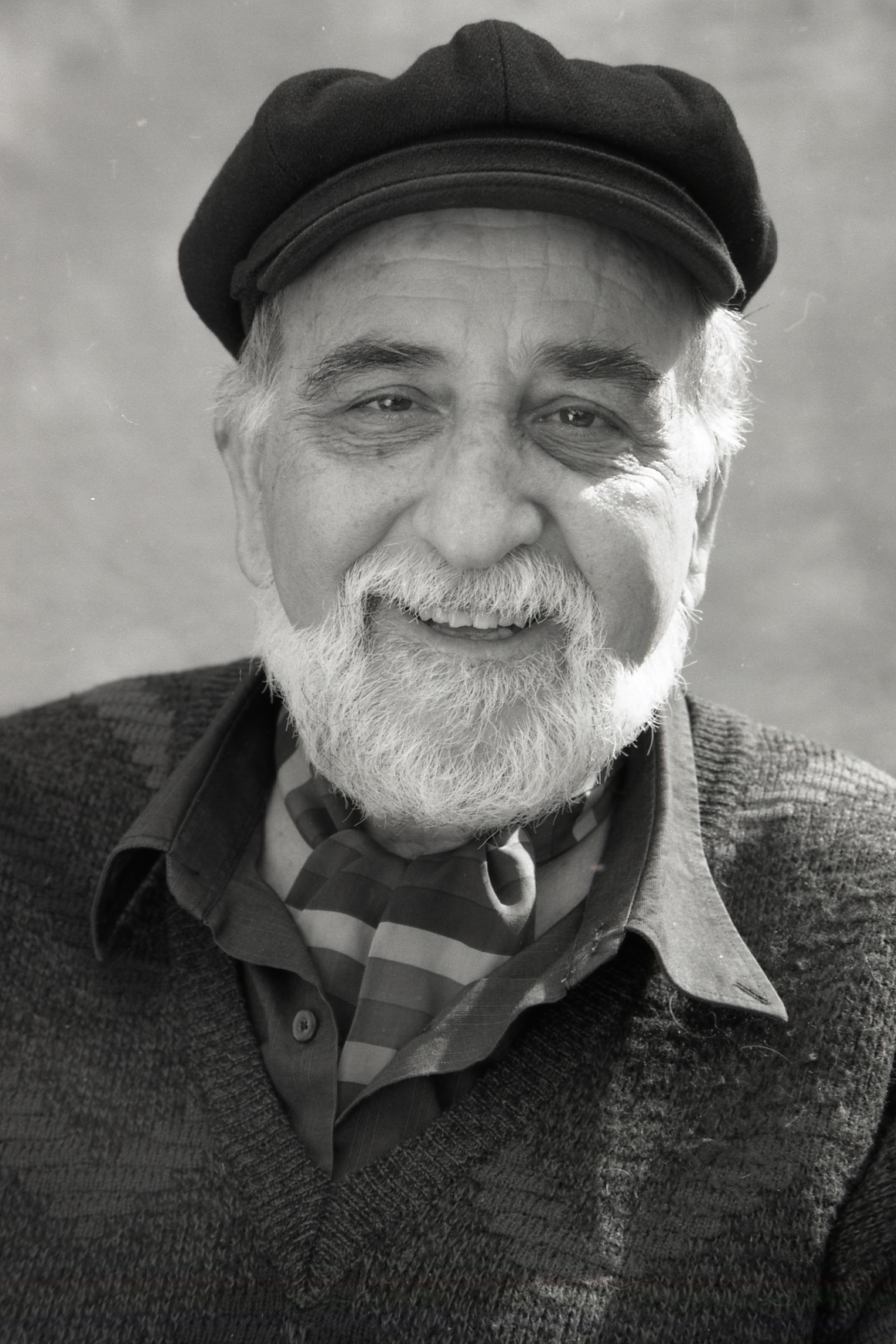
- Olivé en 2002
- Born: 24 November 1932
- Died: 13 March 2021 (aged 88); Barcelona
- Occupation: Theatre director

Josep Anton Codina Olivé (24 November 1932 in Barcelona – 13 March 2021 in Barcelona) was a Spanish theater director.

== Trajectory ==
The beginning of its activity dates back to 1958 with the founding of the Dramatic Expression Team during the scout movement of Catalonia, together with Jordi Vilanova Bosch, Francesc Albors, Jordi Aguadé and Albert Boadella, aimed at improving the techniques of artistic expression. On the other hand, he also worked in the Agrupación Dramática de Barcelona, helping to envelope invitations, as well as participating as an actor. He also collaborated as a theater critic for the magazine Serra d'Or.

Later, in 1963, he entered the Adrià Gual School of Dramatic Art (EADAG). Thus he participated in productions such as Vent de garbí i una mica de por (1964) and Ronda de mort a Sinera (1965), among others. The company supposed a renovation within the theatrical scene of the moment and in the professional improvement of the actors, directors, set designers, among others.

His first professional direction was Los títeres de Cachiporra (1964), a work by Federico García Lorca, carried out by EADAG students, as well as Balades del clam i de la fam (1968), by Xavier Fàbregas and Julio César (1968) of Shakespeare . In 1970, he premiered, in hiding, Questions and answers about life and death by Francesc Layret, a work by Maria Aurèlia Capmany.

In 1965 he went to Italy to improve his theater studies, a stay that would give him the opportunity to get to know the Literary Cabaret, and which would inspire him later on. In addition, he had the opportunity to work with other directors such as Gianfranco De Bosio, Aldo Trionfo, Franco Enriquez and Carlo Quartucci.

From 1968 to 1975 he formed the company Ca, barret! with Maria Aurèlia Capmany and Jaume Vidal Alcover. During this stage, he is in charge of the direction and production of Cabaret shows held in the Cova del Drac, works where song and dance are mixed and where he takes advantage to talk about current issues. Examples are Manicomi d'estiu (1968) by Jaume Vidal Alcover, Homenatge a Picasso (1971) by Josep Palau i Fabre or Dones, Flors i Pitança by Maria Aurèlia Capmany. Later, in 1975 he founded the company La Roda where he directed Varietat de varietats by Jaume Vidal Alcover and Maria Aurèlia Capmany, among others.

It is worth mentioning his collaboration as a teacher in various institutions: between 1966 and 1995 he worked at the Laietània Schools, in 1972 at the Orfeón de Sants Theater School, in 1974 at the Barcelona Actors School. Likewise, in 1980 he directed the Tarragona Municipal School of Dramatic Art with Pere Salabert and in 1988 he began working at the Barcelona Theater Institute as a teacher and coordinator. Also, at the Theater Institute, he collaborated with the MAE (Museum of Performing Arts) in documentation and research tasks since the late 1980s and directed the theaters of the Institute in the early 2000s.

Codina was also the organizer of the Tarragona Theater Festival (from 1971 to 1983) and the Grec Festival (1984 and 1985 edition).

In 2018 he received the National Prize for Culture of Catalonia.

== Philanthropy ==
In the summer of 2019 he donated his fund to the Centre de Documentació i Museu de les Arts Escèniques. This brings together all the documentation regarding the production of unrealized works, of works carried out, of works where he has participated as an assistant director, as well as a teacher and organizer of different events. Mainly noteworthy are the hand programs, posters, scripts, stage projections and five puppets; the puppets represent the founders of the "Quatre Gats", designed for the show Homenatges a Picasso, and Josep Anton Codina himself.

== Death ==
Codina Olivé died in Barcelona of natural causes on Saturday 13 March 2021, at the age of 88.

== Plays ==
- 16 March 1967. Aquí no ha pasado nada. Original by Juan Soler Antich. Released in the Dome of Barcelona's Coliseum by the Adrià Gual School of Dramatic Art.
- 27 June 1967. Balades de clam i de fam. Original by Xavier Fàbregas. Released in the Dome of Barcelona's Coliseum by the Adrià Gual School of Dramatic Art.
- 1968. Els mites de Bagot, original by Xavier Romeu.
- 24 June 1968. Julio César. Original by William Shakespeare, Josep Maria de Sagarra translation. Released in the square of Ayuntamiento de Hospitalet de Llobregat, for Alpha 63 company.
- 29 October 1968. Vent de garbí i una mica de por. Original by Maria Aurèlia Capmany. Released in Teatro Romea de Barcelona for Nueva Compañía de Barcelona.
- 22 December 1968. Manicomi d'estiu o la felicitat de comprar i vendre. Cabaret show from Jaume Vidal Alcover, released in the Cova del Drac de Barcelona for the Ca Barret company.
- 2 February 1969. Las aventuras de Alicia en el país de las maravillas. A scenic adaptation by Xavier Romeu from the Lewis Carroll book.
- 10 March 1969. Ànimes de cantir. Original from Xavier Romeu.
- 1969. Variedades-2. A Cabaret show, with Maria Aurèlia Capmany and Jaume Vidal Alcover texts, performed in Barcelona's Cova del Drac.
- 21 November 1970. Preguntes i respostes sobre la vida i la mort de Francesc Layret, abogado de los obreros de Cataluña. Original by Maria Aurèlia Capmany and Xavier Romeu.
- 1973. La comedia de los errores de W. Shakespeare. A Maria de Sagarra translation. Performed by the theatre school from Orfeó de Sants. Teatre Grec from Barcelona.
- 2 May 2011. Preguntes i respostes sobre la vida i la mort de Francesc Layret, abogado de los obreros de Cataluña. Original from Maria Aurèlia Capmany and Xavier Romeu.
