= Notre Dame Preparatory School (Towson, Maryland) =

Catholic girls school in Maryland, US

Location
- 815 Hampton Lane; Towson, (Baltimore County), Maryland 21286; United States; 39°24′53″N 76°34′45″W

Information
- Type: Private, All-Girls
- Motto: Veritatem Prosequimur (We Pursue Truth)
- Religious affiliation: Roman Catholic
- Established: 1873
- Head of School: Dr. Angela Allen
- Grades: 6–12
- Campus size: 60 acres (0.24 km^{2})
- Colors: Blue and White
- Slogan: Educating young women to transform the world.
- Team name: Blazers
- Rival: McDonogh School
- Accreditation: Middle States Association of Colleges and Schools
- Newspaper: The Gateway
- Yearbook: Finis
- Tuition: $24,600 for 2025-2026
- Website: www.notredameprep.com

Notre Dame Preparatory School is a private, all-girls Roman Catholic, independent school in Towson, Maryland. It is located in the Roman Catholic Archdiocese of Baltimore. Notre Dame Preparatory School is one of Baltimore's oldest Catholic, college preparatory schools for girls. Founded in 1873 by the School Sisters of Notre Dame, a teaching order from Germany, Notre Dame Prep is located in Towson, Maryland, north of Baltimore.

== History ==
Notre Dame Preparatory School (NDP) was founded on September 21, 1873 in Baltimore, Maryland on Charles Street by the School Sisters of Notre Dame, under the name Notre Dame of Maryland Collegiate Institute for Young Ladies. There were 63 pupils. The school was founded due to overcrowding at the SSND's first school in Baltimore, Institute of Notre Dame. Ulysses S. Grant, President of the United States, presided over the first commencement as his niece, Bessie Sharp, was a student at the school in 1876. Notre Dame's preparatory school existed 20 years before the college. In response to the high school graduates' requests in the early 1880s, the School Sisters of Notre Dame expanded Notre Dame of Maryland's curriculum with two years of post-secondary education. This led to the charter of the college on April 2, 1896. Although the school has always been for girls, in the early 1900s, boys were admitted. The sisters began to admit them, it is believed, at the urging of Cardinal James Gibbons for the convenience of some Baltimore families. In more than one school catalogue, the sisters assigned girls' names to the boys. In another, they penciled in "B" above each boy's name. By the late 1920s, however, the school was once again all-female. In an attempt to distinguish the prep school from the College of Notre Dame of Maryland (now Notre Dame of Maryland University) and to meet the growing demand for classroom space, the school moved in 1960 to the current Hampton Lane campus in the Hampton neighborhood of Towson, Maryland.

In 2010, the school celebrated its 50th anniversary on the Hampton Lane campus with a parade of students and a Mass led by Jesuit Father James McAndrews. Students, wearing the traditional uniform including the blue dress, blazer and saddle shoes, processed into the Mass carrying each class banner the school has hosted since its move to the Hampton Lane campus. Many of the school’s oldest traditions were mentioned in the celebrations including Gym Meet, one of the oldest annual traditions, begun in 1929.

== Academics ==
An admission test and interview is required to apply to Notre Dame Preparatory School for both the Middle and Upper Levels. Currently, the school has over 6,000 living alumni and enrolls about 750 students from grades 6-12. Class sizes average 16-20 students and the school boasts a student-faculty ratio of 9:1. Notre Dame Preparatory School offers more than 160 courses in core and elective subjects all of which are geared towards college preparation. Courses include mathematics, science, English, history, religion and foreign language, visual and performing arts, physical education and swimming. The school offers 23 Advanced Placement courses in English, language, mathematics, science and the fine arts. The school adheres to a phasing system that aims to ensure each student is learning at the level suitable for her. There are four phases, Phase 2, Phase 3, Phase 4 and Phase 5, 5 being the highest and 2 being the lowest. Phases 4 and 3 are equivalent to honors/GT classes at local public schools, and phase 5 is equivalent to Advanced Placement level. A student can move up or down when appropriate and can be in different phases for different subjects.

== Extracurricular activities ==
=== Athletics ===
Notre Dame Preparatory School offers over 15 interscholastic sports during the fall, winter and spring. Fall sports include crew (through Baltimore Community Rowing), field hockey, cross country, soccer, tennis and volleyball. Winter sports include basketball, indoor track, soccer, swimming and winter soccer. Spring sports include crew, lacrosse, softball, golf, tennis, track and field and badminton.

The school is known for its talent and success on their field hockey, lacrosse soccer, and volleyball teams. In fall 2010 the Notre Dame Prep field hockey team was the No. 1-seed in the Interscholastic Athletic Association of the Maryland A Conference. In 2014, the Notre Dame Prep Varsity Volleyball team swept Archbishop Spalding in the IAAM A Conference championships. They also had an undefeated (15-0) season in 2014 and 2015 and won the IAAM championship game for the A conference in 2016.

=== Student organizations ===
Student leadership at NDP consists of four key organizations: Athletic Association (AA), Christian Community Awareness Program (CCAP), Student Council (SC), and Diversity-Equity-Inclusion (DEI) Council. Officers are elected each spring along with one representative from each homeroom. In addition, the school issues three student-led publications including Finis, the school yearbook; Esprit, the school literary magazine; and the school newspaper, The Gateway.

=== Arts ===
The school is aiming towards creating a more encouraged Arts program. A few key aspects of joining the arts at Notre Dame is their mission to cultivate intellectual growth, personal development and freedom of any form of expression. Activities you will find in the arts department include Drama, Music, Visual Arts, and Dance. During school musicals, this all girl institution collaborates with brother schools such as Loyola Blakefield and Calvert Hall. The music department offers activities such as Band, Orchestra, Piano Lab, Chorus and Guitar for students. A few courses involving visual arts include digital media, architecture and art history. The dance department offers multiple ways for the girls to enhance and express their craft through multiple troupes, ballet, etc. As well as two recitals during the academic calendar.

=== School traditions ===
The uniform is unchanged; students still wear nearly the same uniform, saddle shoes, and gym uniform from founding.

Class Colors are chosen by the freshman in their homerooms in September then officially voted on based on the homeroom selections in October. The two class colors are revealed at freshman retreat on October 15. These colors will be on the grade's banner that is hung in the gym. Students also wear these colors at mini gym meet. These colors will follow each grade for all four years.

Ring Day happens during junior year. In November, the junior class has a special liturgy and ceremony where students receive their rings. The ceremony includes a prayer, given by a teacher that was selected by the Junior class, and homeroom teachers calling each girl by name. Then the Junior class president gives a speech and the entire Junior class sings a special song written for the occasion. The girls are then dismissed and allowed to leave at noon. Later that night the girls celebrate with a class dance.

Gym Meet is a tradition where high school students compete in the categories of March, Song, Aerobics, and Dance for the Silver Cup. Each of the four high school classes picks a Gym Meet theme and elects a Gym Meet Captain each year. Gym Meet committees are selected by the Athletic Association. The committees, under the supervision of the Gym Meet Captain, create routines in the categories of dance, march, aerobics and song. The routines are approved by the Athletic Association before the committees teach them to the class. Classes have set practice times after school during the month of February to learn the routine. Gym Meet takes place during the first weekend in March. The classes compete on both Friday and Saturday nights in front of an audience of parents, friends and anonymous judges. Before these performances, they also perform once for the Middle Level of the school the Wednesday before the competition, and again for Mini Meet, the Thursday before. Mini Meet is performed for alumnae and incoming students, and the students of NDP wear their class colors below their gym uniform, a blue tunic. The results of the competition are revealed on Saturday night. Classes with the most points in each category win the respective march, song, aerobics and dance plaques. The class with the most points overall wins the Silver Cup. (In the case of a tie, the winner of the poster category, which is revealed prior to the weekend competition, is awarded the silver cup.)

Walking under the gateway is a recent school tradition that marks the entrance and exit of students to the NDP community. The iron and stone structure is reminiscent of the gateway that once graced the main entrance to the Charles Street Campus. Incoming students walk through the arch toward the school to mark their entrance into the Notre Dame Prep community. Similarly, on graduation day, seniors walk under the arch toward Hampton Lane, symbolizing the end of their journey at NDP.

Other traditions include Tree Trim, Field Day, retreats, Senior New York City Trip, Coffee House, and Penny Queen. The money from Coffee House and Penny Queen goes to benefit Notre Dame's sister school in El Salvador, Ignatio Ellacuria.

== Notable alumnae ==
- Susan L. M. Aumann, member of Maryland House of Delegates
- Kathleen Feeley, president of Notre Dame of Maryland University
- Nancy Hubbard, author, Dean of the College of Business, University of Lynchburg
- Annette March-Grier, top ten finalist for the CNN Hero Award
- Rebecca Meyers, United States Paralympian for swimming
- Katie O'Malley, Maryland state judge, wife of Maryland Governor Martin O'Malley
- Yeardley Love, University of Virginia lacrosse player, murdered May 3, 2010
- Celeste O'Connor, actor known for Madame Web (2024), Ghostbusters: Afterlife (2021) & Ghostbusters: Frozen Empire (2024)

== See also ==
- National Catholic Educational Association
