= Nancy Hubbard =

American author and PR consultant (born 1963)

Dean of University of Lynchburg College of Business
- Incumbent
- Assumed office 2018

1st Director of Goucher College Center for Education, Business and Professional Studies
- In office 2016 – 2018
- Preceded by: Position established

Personal details
- Born: Nancy Anne Hubbard; January 9, 1963 (age 63) Chicago, Illinois, U.S.
- Education: Georgetown University (B.S.); St Anne's College, Oxford (M.S.); Templeton College, Oxford (Ph.D.)
- Occupation: College administrator; Academic

Nancy Anne Hubbard (born January 9, 1963) is an American author, public relations consultant. She is the dean of the College of Business at University of Lynchburg. Hubbard was previously the director of the Goucher College Center for Education, Business and Professional Studies and the Miriam Katowitz Chair of Management and Accounting.

== Early life and education ==
Nancy Anne Hubbard was born in Chicago in 1963 to Elizabeth Edwards, a chemist and diabetes researcher, and William A. Hubbard, a chemical engineer and corporate executive. Growing up, Hubbard was a competitive swimmer and trained at the North Baltimore Aquatic Club. She was a European (Turku, Finland, 1988) and World Masters Swimming Champion (Rio de Janeiro, 1989). Hubbard is in the Notre Dame Preparatory School Athletics Hall of Fame.

She graduated from Notre Dame Preparatory School. Hubbard attended Georgetown University where she competed on the swim team. While at Georgetown, she worked as a sports photographer and shot the NCAA Final Four Tournament for three years. Hubbard earned a Bachelor of Science degree in Business Administration with a minor in Art History in 1985. She completed a Master of Science degree in management at St Anne's College, Oxford in 1986. In 1997, Hubbard earned a doctorate in management from Templeton College, Oxford. Her dissertation was titled Implementing Acquisitions: The Role of Managing Expectation.

== Career ==
After completing her master's degree, Hubbard worked as a public relations consultant. and strategy consultant for Spicer & Oppenheim, now part of Booz, Allen, & Hamilton. in Hong Kong, Oslo, and London. She was an Associate Fellow at Templeton College, Oxford for 18 years where she also served as a lecturer at the Saïd Business School. For a year, Hubbard worked as a producer for Trans World Sport while living in London.

In 1999, she authored "Acquisition Strategy and Implementation." The book was well received. Review comments included: 'Acquisition: Strategy and Implementation is an excellent book...read it now rather than waiting to hear that your employer is acquiring another company or is being acquired." (Ambassador), 'I found myself nodding in agreement and mouthing the occasional 'Aha!' as I read, and I think other HR professionals will do the same...I found a wealth of good advice, tools, and checklists here...readable, clearly laid out, and packed full of good practical advice. It is essential reading for anyone who is involved in, or contemplating a merger or acquisition and I, for one, will be keeping it close to hand." - Martin Hayton, HR Director, Cable & Wireless Communications, in People Management and 'Very readable...an indispensable handbook on a subject affecting more businesses and stakeholders every year.' (The Director) The book had multiple editions in the UK as well as being published by Purdue University Press (Ichor Business) in the United States.

Hubbard published "Conquering Global Markets: Secrets from the World's Most Successful Multinationals" in 2013. The book, sponsored by KPMG, included interviews with senior executives of fifty of the world's largest corporations about how they approached global expansion and the challenges and opportunities created by acquisitions, joint ventures, strategic alliances, and greenfield investment. The companies, from sixteen countries, included Ford Motor Company, Cargill, IMAX, United Technologies, Experian, BP, British Telecom, BAe Systems, Lafarge, SAP, Bayer, Diageo, BAT, Hitachi, Sony, Mitsubishi Chemical, Teva, ABB, Amcor, Santander, Bank of China, JBS, Aditya Birla Group, Standard Bank, and Cadbury Schweppes among others. The book was also subsequently published in Japanese by Toyo Keizai where it was a top ten Amazon seller in its category.

In September 2009, Hubbard joined the Business Management Department at Goucher College where she was the Miriam Katowitz Chair of Management and Accounting. She later became the director of the Goucher College Center for Education, Business and Professional Studies. In 2018, Hubbard was appointed as Dean of the College of Business at University of Lynchburg as well as a professor in management. Hubbard is also a visiting professor at the IAE Aix-Marseilles University in Aix-en-Provence, France and a visiting faculty member of the Moscow School of Management SKOLKOVO. She is also a Fellow of the Royal Society of Arts (FRSA).

In 2012, Hubbard became the NCAA Faculty Athletic Representative for Goucher, a position she held until she left the institution. From January 2015 to 2017, she also served as the Chair of the Landmark Conference Faculty Athletic Representatives. Her association with the NCAA continues to this day—she currently serves as the Faculty Athletic Representative for the University of Lynchburg and is the vice-president of the Faculty Athletics Representatives Association representing all DIII institutions at the NCAA level now in her second term in this role.

== Personal life ==
Hubbard married an English investment banker on August 28, 1992. She has since remarried and has five children.

== Selected works ==
=== Books ===
- Hubbard, Nancy (1999). Acquisition: Strategy and Implementation. Springer. ISBN 9781349148707.
- Hubbard, Nancy (2013). Conquering Global Markets: Secrets from the World's Most Successful Multinationals. Springer. ISBN 9781137307729.
