= McDaniel College Budapest =

Hungarian overseas campus of the American university

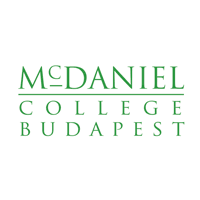
- Official logo of the McDaniel College Budapest
- Motto: E Tenebris in Lucem Voco ("I call you out of darkness into light")
- Type: Private
- Established: 1993; 33 years ago
- President: Julia Jasken, Ph.D.
- Dean: Dr. László Frenyó
- Location: Budapest, Hungary
- Campus: Suburban
- Website: mcdaniel.hu

McDaniel College Budapest is the European campus of McDaniel College, an accredited, private college of the Liberal Arts and Sciences, located in Westminster, Maryland, United States. It offers a standard American four-year undergraduate program in Hungary, leading to an American Bachelor of Arts degree. Students have the option to complete the final two years of study at the main campus of the college in the United States. In addition, students enrolled in Budapest earn credits that are fully transferable to any other American college or university.

The European campus of McDaniel College in Budapest is accredited by the Commission on Higher Education of the Middle States Association of Colleges and Schools, the accrediting agency for McDaniel College. McDaniel College Budapest is registered in Hungary as a foreign institution of higher education by permission of the Hungarian Minister of Education.

== History ==
The Budapest campus of McDaniel College was established in 1993 and the first academic year started in September 1994. Originally it was placed in a modern educational centre on the Buda side and moved to its recent location in 2001, a restored late 19th century school building. Since its founding, more than 300 students who began their studies in Budapest have graduated from McDaniel College. In addition, several hundred students from McDaniel College in Westminster as well as other colleges have studied abroad there.

In 2017, McDaniel was the first college to sign an agreement in compliance with a new Hungarian law affecting all universities based outside the European Union.

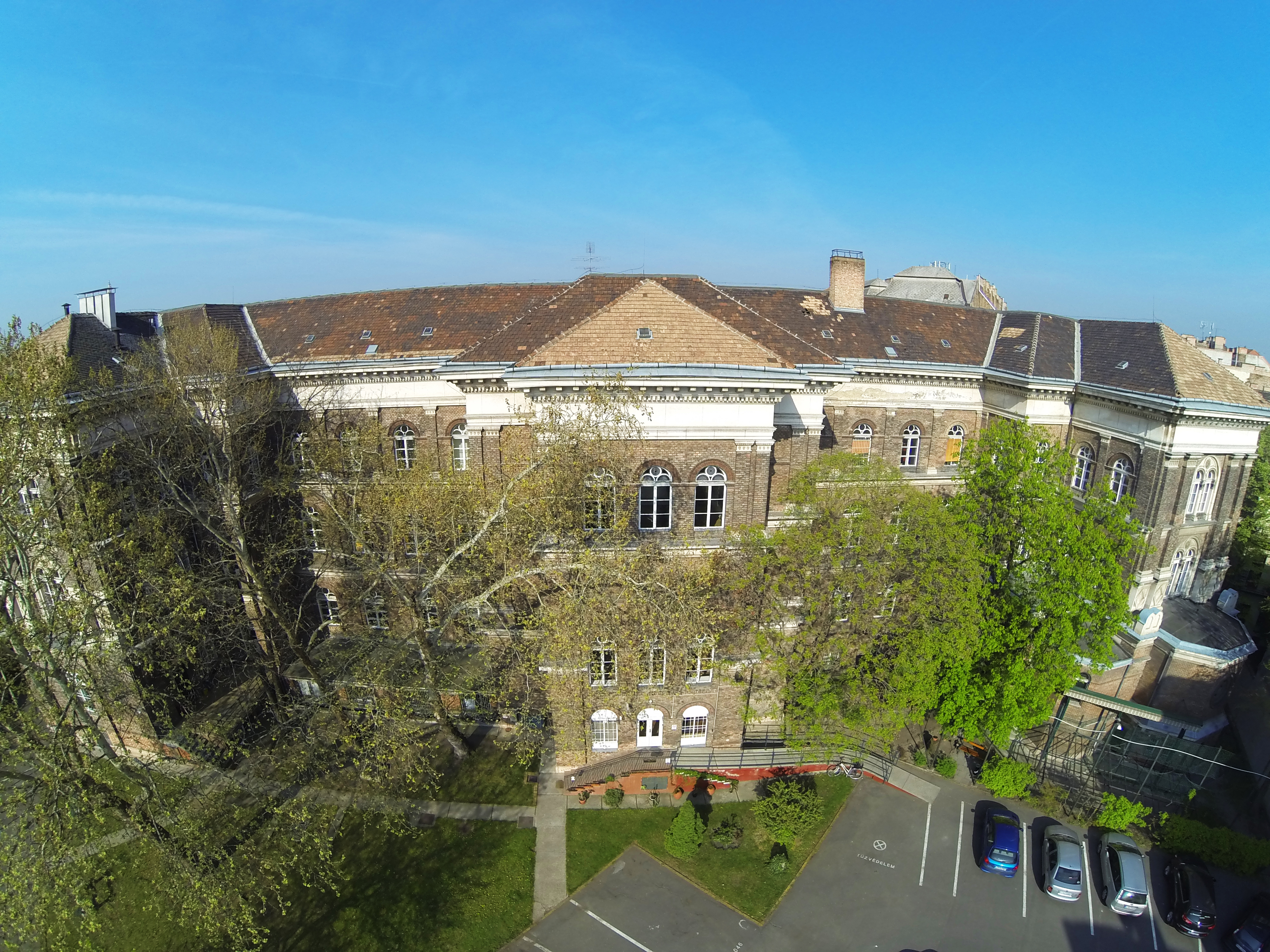
The building of the McDaniel College Budapest.

== Budapest campus ==
The Budapest campus is located in a restored school building adjacent to the Veterinary College of Szent István University. Facilities include a computer lab, classrooms, a board room, gymnasium and cafeteria. The average class size is eight students.

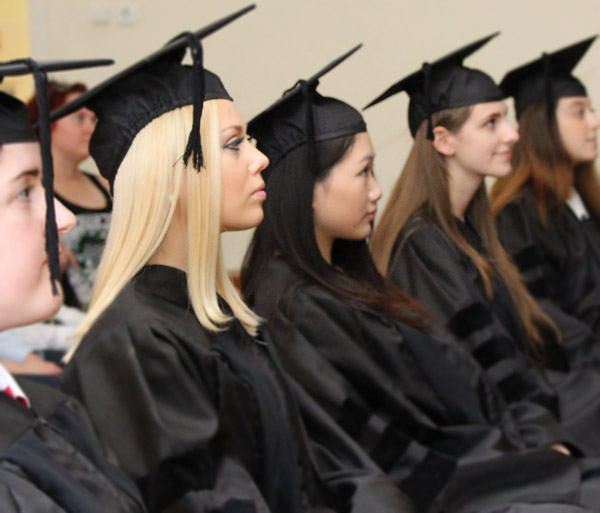
McDaniel Graduation

== Majors ==
McDaniel College Budapest offers a number of major programs, from art history, business, and communication, to political science and psychology. Students can enter the program as undecided, sample a number of different courses, and then choose their major. In addition, if students decide they would like to pursue a major different than the one they started, they are free to change majors—all of the credits earned remain on a student's record, and no time is lost for graduation. Some of the majors can be pursued in combined dual major programs—art-communication, business-economics—that combine features of more than one major program in order to give students more options after graduation.

== Students ==
Students from more than twenty countries study at the college. Classes are conducted in English. Campus has a student newspaper, Messenger.
