= Western Maryland College Historic District =

Historic district in Maryland, United States

- U.S. National Register of Historic Places
- U.S. Historic district
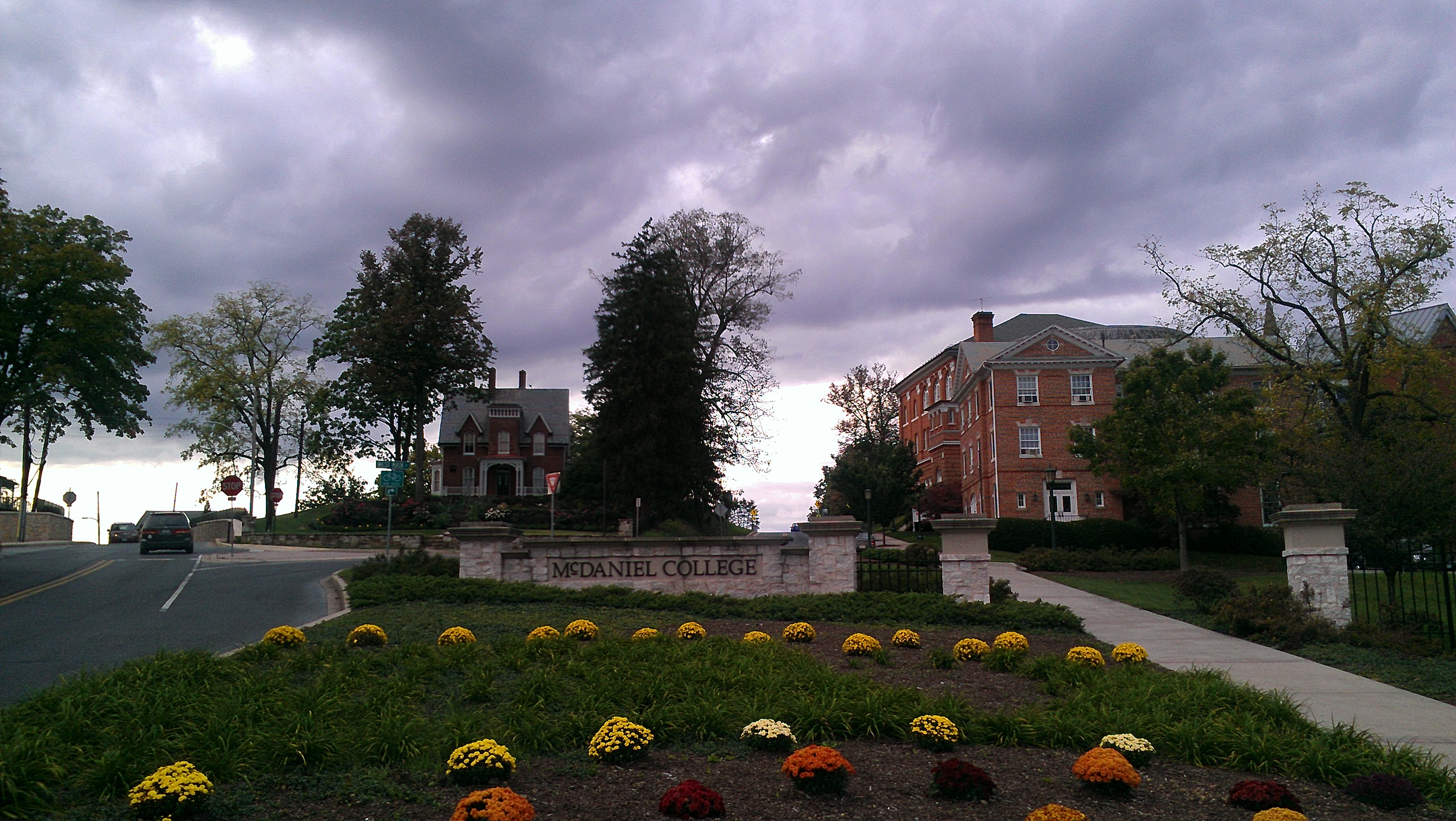

- Location within Maryland Location within the United States
- Location: W. Main and College Sts., Westminster, Maryland
- Coordinates: 39°34′53″N 77°0′9″W
- Area: 3 acres (1.2 ha)
- Built: 1871
- Architect: Cott, Jackson C.
- Architectural style: Colonial Revival, Gothic, Romanesque
- NRHP reference No.: 76000985
- Added to NRHP: March 26, 1976

Western Maryland College Historic District is a national historic district at Westminster, Carroll County, Maryland, United States. It is situated within the confines of the present 100-plus acre college campus of McDaniel College and comprises an area of about three acres at its southeast corner. It includes six of the college's earliest surviving buildings and structures: Alumni Hall, Carroll Hall, Levine Hall, The President's House, Little Baker Chapel, and the Ward Memorial Arch. These structures are the oldest surviving architectural links with the 19th century beginnings of the college.

It was added to the National Register of Historic Places in 1976.
