= McDaniel College =

Private college in Westminster, Maryland, US

Coordinates: 39°35′5″N 77°0′7″W

- Former name: Western Maryland College (1867–2002)
- Motto: E Tenebris in Lucem Voco (Latin)
- Motto in English: I call you out of darkness into light
- Type: Private college
- Established: 1867; 159 years ago
- Endowment: $156.8 million (2024)
- President: Julia Jasken
- Administrative staff: 103 full-time
- Students: 2,882 (Fall 2023)
- Undergraduates: 1,665 (Fall 2023)
- Postgraduates: 1,217 (Fall 2023)
- Location: Westminster, Maryland, United States
- Campus: Suburban 160 acres (64.7 ha) 70 buildings
- Athletics: NCAA Division III Centennial
- Colors: Green and Gold
- Mascot: Green Terror
- Website: mcdaniel.edu
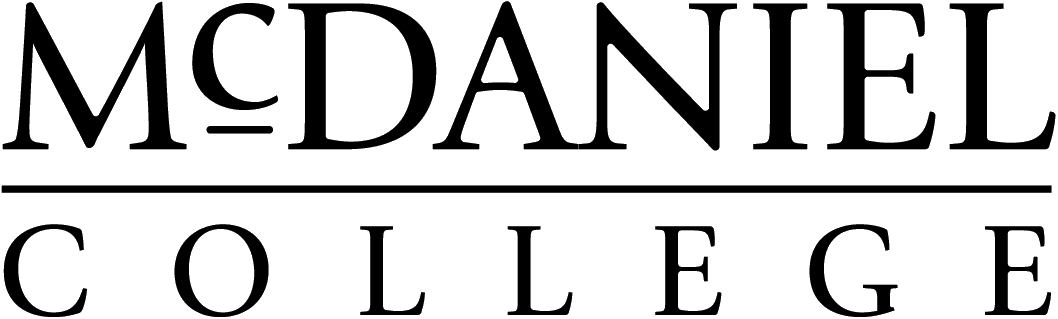

McDaniel College is a private college in Westminster, Maryland, United States, established in 1867. McDaniel College is accredited by the Middle States Commission on Higher Education. The college also has a satellite campus, McDaniel College Budapest, in Budapest, Hungary. The college owns and manages a shopping center and residential properties through its for-profit arm.

== History ==
The college was founded in 1867 as Western Maryland College, and was named for the Western Maryland Railroad because the college's first Board chairman, John Smith of Wakefield, was also the president of the railroad. (Neither the railroad nor the Methodist Protestant Church contributed funds to facilitate the establishment of the college. Some contributions, however, were received from Methodist Protestant laymen, including John Smith.) It had a voluntary fraternal affiliation with the Methodist Protestant (later United Methodist) Church from 1868 until 1974; the adjacent but separate institution, the Westminster Theological Seminary, was a principal site for training Methodist Protestant (later United Methodist) clergy in the Maryland region. The ties with the United Methodist Church were cut over a court case in which Western Maryland and other religiously affiliated schools in Maryland were being challenged over state funding received by the colleges because of their religious ties. The other schools retained their affiliations and won the case.

The college's first building went up in 1866–1867, with an inaugural class of 37 men and women in September 1867. Western Maryland was the first coeducational institution south of the Mason–Dixon line and was among the first in the nation. The school's original charter read that the school would exist:

For the benefit of students without regard to race, religion, color, sex, national or ethnic origin ... without requiring or enforcing any sectarian, racial or civil test, and without discrimination on the basis of sex, national or ethnic origin, nor shall any prejudice be made in the choice of any officer, teacher, or other employee in the said college on account of these factors.

However, Western Maryland College was primarily a school without minority race representation until the 1960s.

Baker Memorial Chapel was dedicated April 20, 1958. The chapel, was built in memory of W.G. Baker, Joseph D. Baker, Daniel Baker, and Sarah Baker. The organ in the new chapel has been given by two alumni, father and son, Roger J. Whiteford, a prominent Washington attorney and graduate in 1906, and his son Joseph S. Whiteford a graduate in 1943, president of the Aeolian-Skinner Organ Company, Boston, Mass. The chapel was designed by architects Otto Eugene Adams and E.G. Riggs, of Baltimore. The Chapel steeple, 113 feet tall, is visible for miles around and was originally topped by a stainless steel cross 6 feet (1.8 m) in height. The wood panels of the chancel have been designed to complement the antique organ console which was originally in the Bruton Parish Church, at Williamsburg, Virginia. The organ, with its 2,310 pipes, is held to be the largest in the area. The Whitefords also gave the carillon installed in the steeple.

In 1975 the college agreed to permanently remove religious symbols atop campus chapels and to introduce strict quotas on Methodist representation on the college board and among the faculty as a result of a settlement with the American Civil Liberties Union and Americans United for Separation of Church and State. Up until the 1980s, there was a specially constructed bunker in the basement of Lewis Hall, the science building, that would have housed the Wartime Information Security Program, a Cold War-era group that would have been responsible for censorship in the aftermath of a nuclear war.

McDaniel College Budapest (formerly known as Western Maryland College Budapest), the European campus of McDaniel College was established in collaboration with College International Budapest in 1994. McDaniel College was also home to the summer training camp of the Baltimore Colts and later Baltimore Ravens NFL team until the 2011 Season when the team relocated training camp to their Owings Mills facility. Newer buildings on campus include the Science Hall, gymnasium, library, and student union center. On January 11, 2002, the trustees announced their unanimous decision to change the name of the college. On July 1, 2002, WMC officially became McDaniel College, honoring alumnus William Roberts McDaniel and his 65-year association with the school. The naming process during the spring of 2002 included input from students, faculty and alumni about possible names.

Since Roger Casey, former McDaniel President, took office in 2010, U.S. News & World Report ranking of the College decreased from 122 in 2010 to 134 in 2018. Over the same period, the enrollment decreased by 17%. In 2019 U.S. News & World Report removed McDaniel from the list of National Liberal Art Colleges. In May 2016, Fitch Ratings revised its outlook for McDaniel from Stable to Negative. In June 2016 adjunct faculty at McDaniel voted to unionize. McDaniel is the second four-year university in the state with collective bargaining for the part-time employees. Adjuncts are represented by Service Employees International Union Local 500. In 2017 Forbes assigned McDaniel financial grade C+.

In February 2019, the Board of Trustees at the College approved the suspension of enrollment for future students in the majors of Art History, Religious Studies, French, German, and Music. Courses in all of these programs, except for German, will still be offered. In a letter to students and faculty, McDaniel officials wrote that the number of students currently enrolled in the affected programs makes up fewer than 3 percent of the student body. As of 2019, the future of faculty in the affected programs is unclear. An online petition against the decision, "Open Letter in Support of Faculty in Art History, Religious Studies, French, German, Music, Latin, and Deaf Education at McDaniel College" collected more than 650 signatures.

McDaniel College's current president, Julia Jasken, was inaugurated in November 2021.

=== Presidents ===
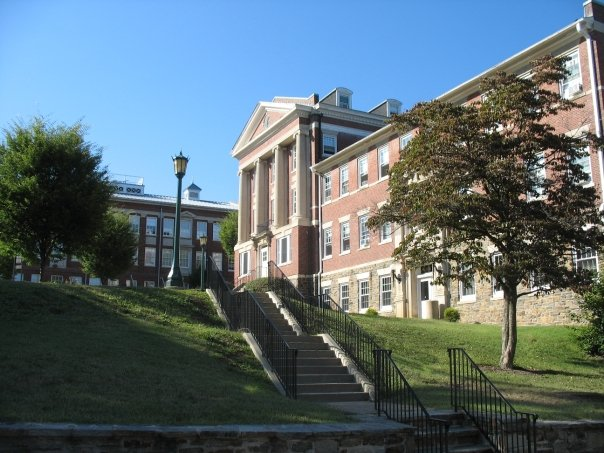
A view of McDaniel College

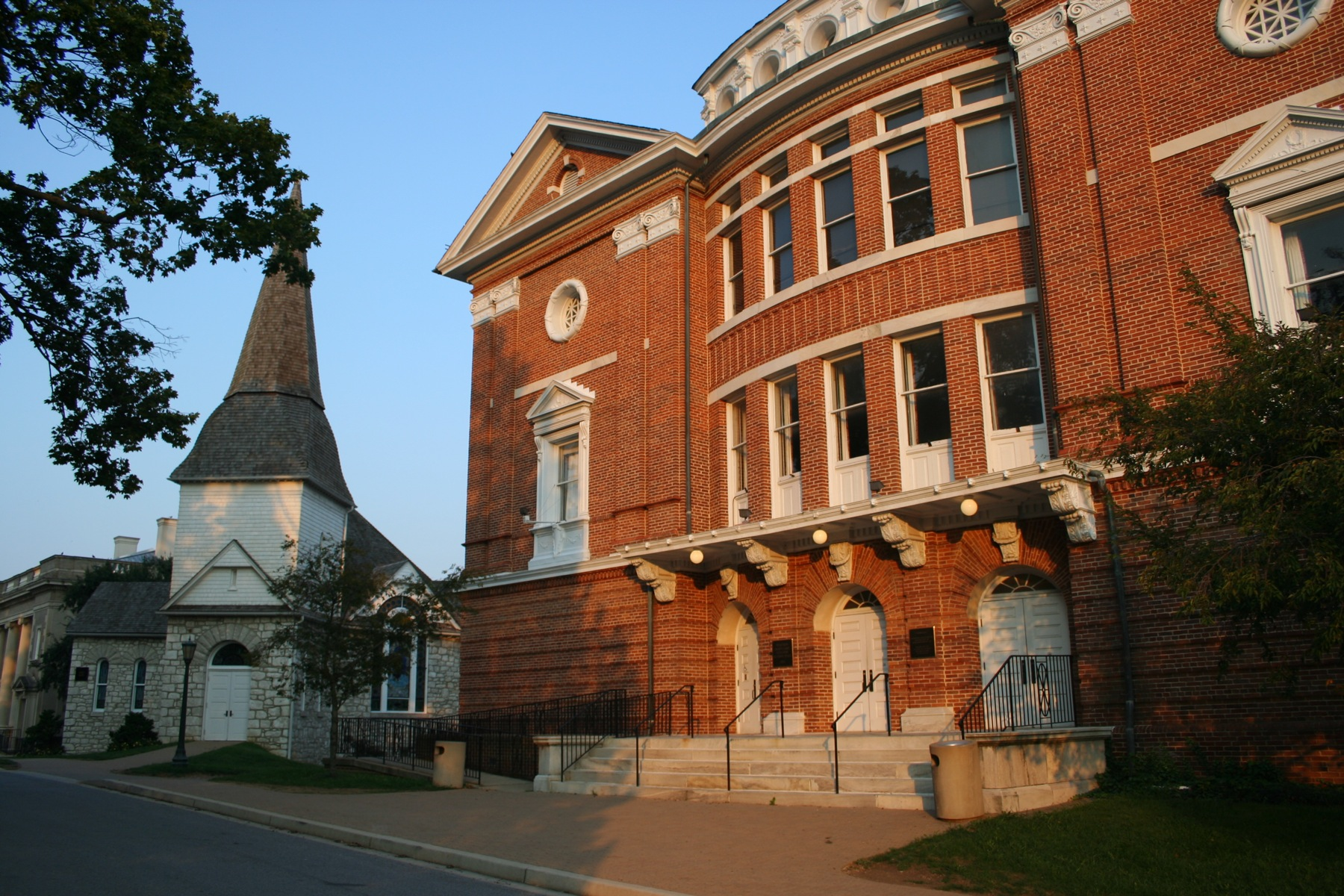
Another view of McDaniel College

President	Tenure
J. T. Ward	1867–1886
Thomas Hamilton Lewis	1886–1920
Albert Norman Ward	1920–1935
Fred G. Holloway	1935–1947
Lowell S. Ensor	1947–1972
Ralph C. John	1972–1984
Robert H. Chambers	1984–2000
Joan Develin Coley	2000–2010
Roger Casey	2010–2021
Julia Jasken	2021–present

== Athletics ==
McDaniel athletics wordmark

McDaniel athletic teams are the Green Terror. The college is a member of the Division III level of the National Collegiate Athletic Association (NCAA), primarily competing in the Centennial Conference (an athletic conference that it's a charter member) since the 1992–93 academic year for all sports (originally for football since the 1981–82 academic year).

McDaniel has 24 intercollegiate varsity sports. Men's sports include baseball, basketball, cross country, football, golf, lacrosse, soccer, swimming, tennis, track & field (indoor and outdoor) and wrestling; women's sports include basketball, cross country, field hockey, golf, lacrosse, soccer, softball, swimming, tennis, track & field (indoor and outdoor) and volleyball.

McDaniel's nickname was ranked 13th for U.S. News & World Report weirdest mascot names in 1999. The name originated from how teams would describe the Western Maryland Players as "Terrors" on the field. The name stuck and since October 1923 McDaniel College has been known as the Green Terror.

=== Football ===
The Green Terror were the first team invited to the Orange Bowl and claimed the 1929 national championship.

McDaniel football dates back to 1891 when the first game was played against northern rival Gettysburg College.

McDaniel was the preseason training camp site for the Baltimore Colts from 1953 to 1971 and the Baltimore Ravens from 1996 to 2010. Head coach John Harbaugh still hosts clinics at McDaniel.

In 2011, McDaniel was ranked 6th in the country for best tailgating by the Weather Channel. This is due to the fans being able to park their cars practically on the field and grill & drink during the game, a tradition that dates to the 1920s. McDaniel College was also ranked in Southern Living magazine for the top 20 of the "South's Best Tailgates." At football games McDaniel can have an average attendance over 5,000 and highs as much as 8,750 even during a losing season, ranking in the top five in the country for D3 football.

== Notable alumni ==
- Stephen Bainbridge (1980), William D. Warren Professor of Law at UCLA
- Nick Campofreda, NFL player
- David Carrasco, professor of Latin America Studies at the Harvard Divinity School
- Whittaker Chambers (1959–1961: adult student), spy, author, journalist, editor, and central witness in the Alger Hiss Case
- Rip Engle (1930), head football coach at Penn State (1950–1965), member of the College Football Hall of Fame
- Odd Haugen (1973), Norwegian strongman, World’s Strongest Man competitor, Norway’s Strongest Man
- Knut Hjeltnes (1973), 4x Norwegian Olympian in the discus throw; placed fourth at the 1984 Olympics and seventh at the 1976 and 1988 Olympics
- Dávid Jancsó (2004), Hungarian film editor, 2025 Oscar nominee, Achievement in Film Editing for The Brutalist
- Peter Mark Kendall (2008), actor in television, film, and theatre
- C. Dianne Martin (1965), computer scientist
- Harrison Stanford Martland (1905), pathologist noted for discoveries regarding exposure to radiation and "punch drunk" prize fighters
- Thomas Roberts (1994), news anchor on MSNBC, former anchor for CNN Headline News
- Alan Rabinowitz (1974), author of several books on conservation of wildlife, CEO of Panthera
- Wendy Ruderman (1991), Pulitzer Prize–winning journalist of the Philadelphia Daily News
- Norm Sartorius (1969), artist and woodworker known for fine art spoons
- Yuri Schwebler (1942–1990), Yugoslavia-born American conceptual artist and sculptor
- F. Mason Sones Jr. (1940), cardiologist, inventor of coronary angiography
- Suzanne Stettinius (2011), modern pentathlete representing the United States at the 2012 Olympics
- Greg Street (1991), game designer at Blizzard Entertainment, systems designer for World of Warcraft
- Joseph S. Whiteford (1943), president of the Aeolian-Skinner Organ Company

=== Politics ===
- Wayne K. Curry (1972), Maryland politician
- William F. Goodling (M1959), U.S. Congressman from Pennsylvania (1975–2001)
- Wade Kach (1970), Maryland politician
- Robert J. Kleine (1963), treasurer of the State of Michigan
- Frank M. Kratovil Jr. (1990), former U.S. Congressman from Maryland, now a judge
- John Mays Little (died 1950), American politician
- Sen. Frederick C. Malkus Jr. (1934) Maryland state legislator
- Joshua Weldon Miles (1878), U.S. Congressman from Maryland (1895–1897)
- J. Smith Orrick (died 1930), Maryland state delegate
- Grace Rohrer (1946), North Carolina politician, arts advocate and women's rights activist
- Ellen Sauerbrey (1959), former U.S. Assistant Secretary of State, Maryland gubernatorial candidate
- Nancy R. Stocksdale (1956), Maryland politician
- Calvin B. Taylor (1882), Maryland banker and politician

== See also ==
- Western Maryland College Historic District
