= Jack Cornell =

American football player (born 1989)

No. 69, 72
- Position: Offensive guard / Offensive tackle

Personal information
- Born: June 4, 1989 (age 37); Quincy, Illinois, U.S.
- Listed height: 6 ft 6 in (1.98 m)
- Listed weight: 320 lb (145 kg)

Career information
- High school: Quincy (IL) Notre Dame
- College: Illinois
- NFL draft: 2012: undrafted

Career history
- Baltimore Ravens (2012−2013)*; Oakland Raiders (2013)
- * Offseason or practice squad member only

Awards and highlights
- Super Bowl champion (XLVII)

Career NFL statistics
- Games played: 1
- Stats at Pro Football Reference

John Leslie Cornell Jr. (born June 4, 1989) is an American former professional football player who was an offensive guard in the National Football League (NFL). Cornell originally signed with the Baltimore Ravens as an undrafted free agent in 2012. Cornell played college football at Illinois. Cornell is currently head coach of the Quincy Notre Dame Raiders.

In high school, Cornell was ranked the 12th prospect in the state of Illinois by Rivals.com and was nationally ranked as the 37th prospect at the offensive tackle position. He was a 2006 Max-Enfinger All-American while at Notre Dame High School. He participated in the 2007 Illinois Shrine Bowl.

== Early life ==
Cornell attended Notre Dame High School at Quincy, Illinois, in which he earned three letters for football and four letters for wrestling. Cornell was a 2006 Max-Enfinger All-American at high school. Cornell was a two-time Chicago Tribune All-state as both Junior and Senior.

College recruiting
Name	Hometown	School	Height	Weight	40^{‡}	Commit date
Jack Cornell Jr. Offensive tackle	Quincy, Illinois	Notre Dame High School	6 ft 5 in (1.96 m)	291 lb (132 kg)	5.33	Dec 19, 2006
Jack Cornell Jr. Offensive tackle	Recruit ratings: Scout: Rivals:					
Overall recruit ranking: Scout: 28 (OT) Rivals: 38 (OT), 4 (Ill)
Note: In many cases, Scout, Rivals, 247Sports, On3, and ESPN may conflict in their listings of height and weight.; In these cases, the average was taken. ESPN grades are on a 100-point scale.; Sources: "Illinois Football Commitments". Rivals.; "2007 Illinois Football Commits". Scout.; "Scout.com Team Recruiting Rankings". Scout.; "2007 Team Ranking". Rivals.com.

== College career ==
Cornell played college football at the University of Illinois. Cornell played 29 games at offensive guard for the Illinois Fighting Illini.

In his redshirt freshman year, he played in two games.

In his sophomore year, he played one game for the season.

In his junior year, he played 13 games and started 6 of them at guard and at tackle. He helped the Fighting Illini offense lead the Big Ten in rushing and the 11th ranked rushing team in the nation with an average of 246.1 ypg. On November 20, 2010, he helped the Illinois Fighting Illini offense record a total of 559 yards, including 519 rushing yards against Northwestern in which Illinois won the game 41-20.

In his senior year, he was named a senior team captain for the season. Cornell was a recipient of Illinois Fighting Illini's Red Orange Award. He played and started 13 games at offensive guard for the season. On October 8, 2011, he helped the Fighting Illini offense to record 518 total yards including 308 rushing yards against Indiana in which Illinois wins the game 41-20. On September 24, 2011, he helped anchored the Illinois Fighting Illini offense record a total of 463 yards against Western Michigan.

== Professional career ==
=== Baltimore Ravens ===
On April 28, 2012, he signed with the Baltimore Ravens as an undrafted free agent. On August 31, 2012, he was released on the day of roster cuts. On September 1, 2012, he was re-signed to join the practice squad. On August 25, 2013, he was waived by the Ravens.

=== Oakland Raiders ===
The Raiders signed Cornell to their practice squad on September 11, 2013 and promoted him to their active roster on October 5 and was waived 2 days later on October 7, 2013 and re-signed to the practice squad on Oct. 9. On October 26, Cornell was promoted again to the active roster and was waived once more 2 days later on October 28, 2013. He was re-signed to the practice squad on October 30, 2013. On November 9, 2013 Cornell was signed again and was waived two days later on November 11, 2013. Once again he was re-signed to the practice squad on November 13, 2013.

== Coaching career ==
=== Culver-Stockton College ===
Cornell began his college coaching career in 2017 as the offensive line coach for Culver-Stockton College in Canton, Missouri.

Following his career at Culver-Stockton, he accepted a position at his high school alma mater Quincy Notre Dame as the head football coach.

== Suspension and community support ==
On September 3, 2025, Jack Cornell, head football coach at Quincy Notre Dame High School, was suspended for one game due to "poor judgment exercised in a pre-game team meeting" on August 29, 2025. During the suspension, he was barred from football-related activities but continued his duties as a physical education teacher. Assistant coach Ben Morrison served as interim head coach for the game against Alton-Marquette.

Despite this incident, Cornell was inducted into the Quincy Notre Dame Hall of Fame in 2023, recognizing his contributions to the school's athletic programs. Cornell is also the founder and camp director of the I-72 Do or Die Prospect Showcase, a football camp aimed at developing local talent.
