= Catherine Mackin =

American network TV journalist (1939–1982)

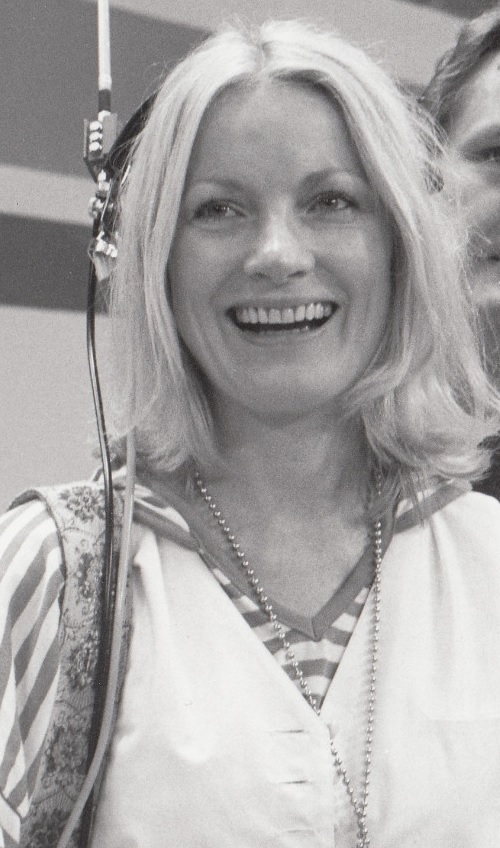
- Mackin reports at the 1976 Democratic National Convention.
- Born: August 28, 1939
- Died: November 20, 1982 (aged 43); Towson, Maryland, U.S.

Catherine Patricia "Cassie" Mackin (August 28, 1939 – November 20, 1982) was a pioneer woman journalist in United States television network broadcasting. In the early 1970s, she anchored a WRC-TV newscast and in 1972 became NBC's first female correspondent to serve as a floor reporter at the national political conventions. In 1976, she became the first woman to regularly anchor an evening network newscast alone.

== Early years ==
Born and raised in Baltimore, Maryland, Mackin won a four-year scholarship to the Institute of Notre Dame before entering Washington College in 1956. A year later, she transferred to the University of Maryland at College Park, and worked for the later defunct Free State Press, a weekly paper published in suburban Washington, D.C. She graduated magna cum laude in June 1960 with a B.A. degree in English and minors in economics and history. Mackin was a member of Alpha Omicron Pi women's social fraternity.

== Career ==
After graduation, Mackin obtained a position at the Baltimore News-American, and beginning as a general assignment reporter, she held a variety of positions before she left the paper in 1963. Between 1960 and 1962, she made guest appearances on both a local Baltimore TV news panel show and on a morning television variety show. From 1963 until 1969, Mackin was employed by Hearst newspapers in its Washington bureau. During her six years at Hearst, she covered the Justice Department, numerous elections, and presidential campaigns, polishing the talents that would make her a successful national news correspondent. In 1967, Mackin became one of the earliest women to receive a Nieman Fellowship to Harvard University, where she studied the history of political institutions.

=== NBC ===
Hired by NBC in 1969, she anchored a half-hour newscast at WRC-TV, its Washington affiliate, in addition to her reporting responsibilities. Mackin received national attention three years later when she became that network's first woman floor reporter at the Democratic and Republican presidential conventions. Her work contributed to the subsequent award of an Emmy to the NBC news team for its coverage. Her report later that year on President Richard Nixon's re-election campaign, in which she stated that the President was saying things about opponent George McGovern that were untrue—the only reporter covering the Nixon campaign to point out Nixon's mendacity—was highlighted in Timothy Crouse's book, The Boys on the Bus. After a stint in Los Angeles, Mackin returned to Washington in 1974 as the Sunday evening anchor and congressional correspondent.

When Barbara Walters left The Today Show in 1976, Mackin was one of six candidates who were tested on air to replace her, but the job went to Jane Pauley. On December 12, Mackin took over the NBC's Sunday Night News, becoming the first woman to solely anchor an evening network newscast on a regular basis.

=== ABC ===
ABC News President Roone Arledge offered Mackin a salary of $100,000, an unprecedented salary for a national correspondent. In September 1977, she joined ABC as their Washington correspondent, temporarily covering the Senate alongside another pioneering female reporter, NBC's Jessica Savitch. She also worked on a 20/20 story about drunk driving, for which she received another Emmy in 1981. Assigned to the 1980 presidential campaign, Mackin spent a good portion of the year following Senator Edward Kennedy around the country.

== Death ==
Mackin, terminally ill with cancer, moved to suburban Baltimore in October 1981 to live with her sister, Margaret. She died in Towson in November 1982 at age 43.
