= Magali García Ramis =

Puerto Rican writer

Magali García Ramis (born 1946, Santurce, Puerto Rico) is a Puerto Rican writer.

== Biography ==
Magali García Ramis (registered at birth as Fredeswinda Magali Antonia García Ramis)was born in 1946 in Santurce, San Juan, Puerto Rico and spent her childhood there with her mother, father and brothers, near her mother's family, with close relations with uncles, cousins and her maternal grandmother.

Her father was a civilian worker in Fort Buchanan; her mother worked in her sister's laboratory for a while and later stayed home with her children. Her eldest aunt, María Luisa Ramis, was the first woman in Puerto Rico to open a laboratory and all her aunts worked there. As a teenager, her family moved to the upscale Miramar section because she and her elder brother had changed schools and her mother wanted to be near them. She enrolled at the Academia del Perpetuo Socorro (Academy of Our Lady of Perpetual Help), where she graduated from high school in 1964.

== Education and literary contributions ==
In 1964 she enrolled at the University of Puerto Rico where she majored in History. While studying, she began to work as a reporter for the newspaper El Mundo. In 1968 she received a scholarship and moved to New York City to study Journalism at Columbia University, graduating in 1969 with a MS degree. It is in New York that she writes her first story, "Todos los domingos" ("Every Sunday").

With this story she won first prize in the literary contest of the Ateneo Puertorriqueño (Puerto Rican Athenaeum). She returned to Puerto Rico in 1971 and started to work for the newspaper El Imparcial. She worked for the newspaper until 1972. She also worked for a l news magazine called Avance until 1973. During this period she continued to write short stories.

García Ramis sent a book composed of 4 short stories to a contest sponsored by the Casa de las Américas in Cuba. She received an honorary mention for one of the stories "La viuda de Chencho el Loco" ("The Widow of Chencho, the Mad Man") which was published in 1974. That same year she moved to Mexico to study a PhD in the Universidad Nacional de México (UNAM) in Latina American Studies. While in Mexico the Institute of Puerto Rican Culture published her first book of short stories, La familia de todos nosotros (1976). She completed the courses and submitted her thesis prospect in UNAM, but returned to Puerto Rico without finishing her degree. In 1977 she began teaching full-time at the School of Communication of the University of Puerto Rico (UPR) and stayed there at for the following 38 years.During her tenure at the UPR she created many of the practical and theoretical courses and seminars that became the core of the Journalism program. She was made Professor Emeritus in 2021.

She finished her famous semi-autographical novel Felices días, tío Sergio (Happy Days, Uncle Sergio) in 1985; it was published in 1986. In 1988, she received a Guggenheim Fellowship to work on her second novel, Las horas del Sur (The Hours of the South). In 1993, García Ramis published La ciudad que me habita (The City that Inhabits Me), a collection of journalistic essays that she wrote over the years, while she worked for El Mundo, El Imparcial, Avance, Claridad and La Hora.

Strongly linked to her homeland, her short stories (which she prefers were novels) are about family relations, Puerto Rican identity and the female condition, themes that have been linked to other leading authors of the 70s generation, such as Rosario Ferré and Olga Nolla. In 2009 she was elected to the Puerto Rican Academy of the Spanish Language. She currently works in literary and historical projects for which she took courses in doctoral studies in history at the Center for Advanced Studies of Puerto Rico and the Caribbean.

== Themes and influences ==
García Ramis's stories are depictions of Puerto Rican culture, family and politics. She writes about interactions within a family, Puerto Rican identity and women's identity.

In her best known work of fiction, Happy Days, Uncle Sergio, (over 100,000 copies sold) she explores the relationship between a young Puerto Rican girl and her uncle, who is rumored to be a homosexual.

== Literary works ==
=== Novels ===
- Felices días, tío Sergio
- Las horas del sur

=== Essays ===
- La ciudad que me habita(book)
- La R de mi padre y otras letras familiares (book)
- Los cerebros que se van y el corazón que se queda
- Hostos, bróder, esto está difícil
- El Chango como pájaro nacional

=== Short stories ===
- La familia de todos nosotros
- Las noches del riel de oro
- Una semana de siete días

Novel for Young Readers

En la cabaña del tiempo escondido

Memoir

El libro de las tías - una memoria

== See also ==
- List of Puerto Rican writers
- List of Puerto Ricans
- Puerto Rican literature
