= Academia del Perpetuo Socorro =

Private, coeducational school in Santurce, San Juan, Puerto Rico

Academy of Our Lady of Perpetual Help
- Academia del Perpetuo Socorro

Location
- 704 Marti Street; Miramar, Santurce, San Juan, Puerto Rico; 00907
- 18°27′16″N 66°5′5″W

Information
- Type: Private, Coeducational
- Motto: Esto perpetua (Be everlasting)
- Established: 21 September 1921
- Director: Monseñor José Emilio Cummings
- Principal: Ms. Sarita Vázquez (PPK-K) Mrs. Jeannette Sánchez (1-6) Mrs. Enid Pereira (7-12)
- Grades: PPK-12
- Enrollment: 900 (2018-2019)
- Accreditation: Middle States Association of Colleges and Schools
- Newspaper: Elipsis, Zeitgeist
- Affiliations: Catholic, Roman Catholic Archdiocese of San Juan de Puerto Rico
- Website: www.aps-pr.org

Academia del Perpetuo Socorro (English: "Academy of Our Lady of Perpetual Help") was founded in 1921 as a Catholic parochial school of the Perpetuo Socorro Parish at the Archdiocese of San Juan, Puerto Rico. The school is located in Miramar in Puerto Rico's capital city of San Juan. Students, teachers and alumni commonly refer to their school as Perpetuo.

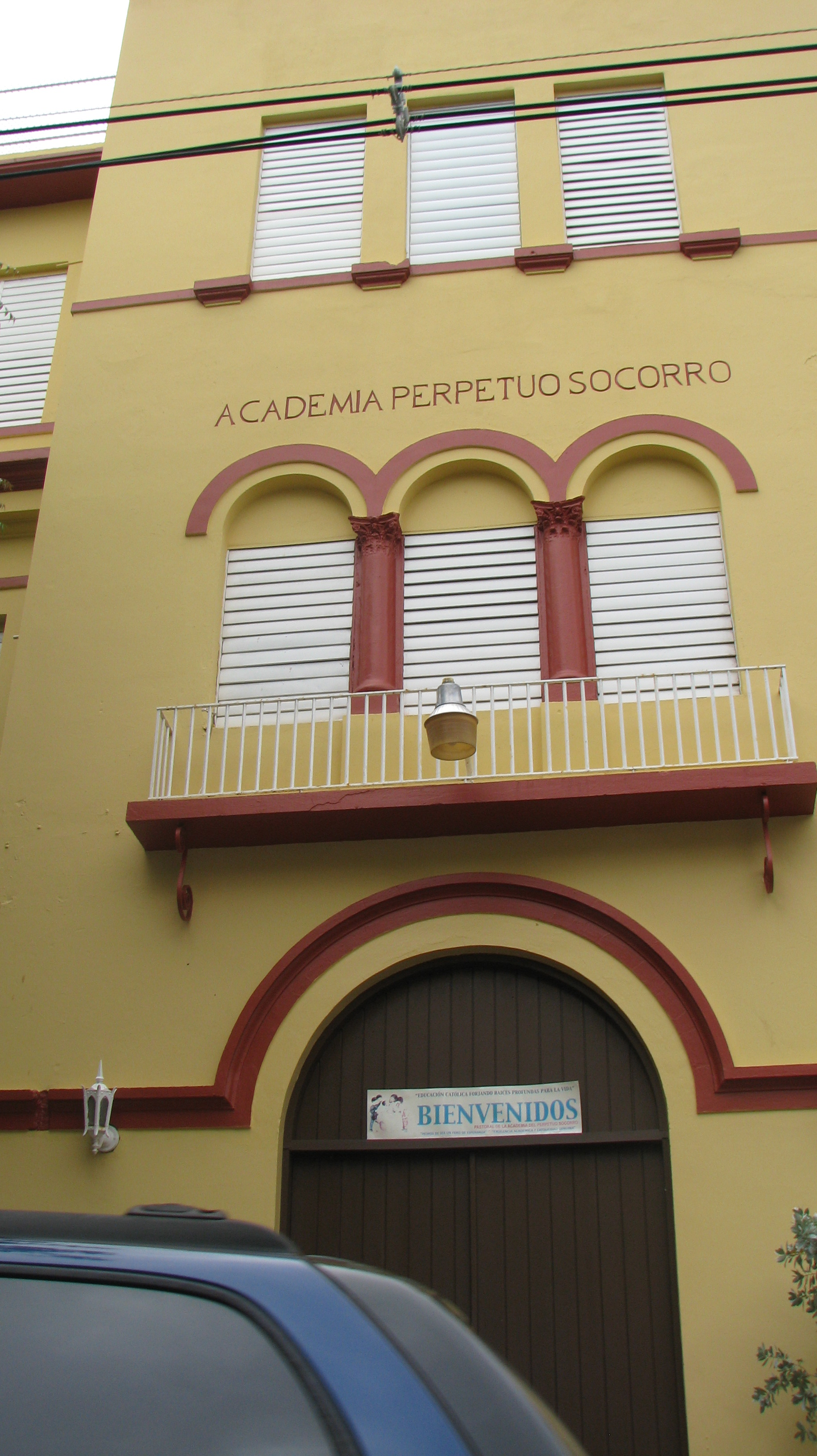
Academia del Perpetuo Socorro in Miramar, Santurce, Puerto Rico

== Mission ==
The goal of the Academia del Perpetuo Socorro is the complete development of the student - spiritually, mentally, morally, socially, culturally, and physically in order to live a full life and to prepare for his/her final goal - union with God. To this end, the school works to create a Catholic academic community in which faith, knowledge, and recreation are shared in a spirit of freedom, love, and creativity. The school, however, does not emphasize religion over other subjects, accepts students of all faiths and does not impose religious requirements such as baptism, confirmation or church attendance as a condition for continued attendance.

== Motto ==
"Esto Perpetua" translated as "This Endures" stressing how the Catholic values and formal academic education learned at this school, symbolized in the school seal by the oil lamp over the open book, (as in burning the midnight oil) are to permeate individuals and society forever.

== Clubs ==
- Choir
- Drama Club
- United Nations
- Honor Society
- Jr. Honor Society
- Honor Academy
- Helping Hands
- Law Club
- Youth Ministry
- Psychology Club
- Environmental Club
- Math Club
- Spanish Forensics
- Zeitgeist Literary Magazine
- Elipsis
- Student Council
- Girl Up
- Positive Thinking Club

== Sports teams ==
Academia del Perpetuo Socorro has the largest gymnasium in the Caribbean. This gymnasium has three wooden volleyball courts that can also be transformed into two basketball courts. The gymnasium also has a small gym where athletes, faculty members, and students can go to do exercise.

Perpetuo has a varsity program in ten sports:

- Golf
- Basketball
- Bowling
- Baseball
- Tennis
- Volleyball
- Softball
- Soccer
- Indoor soccer
- Cross-country
- Track and field
- Swimming

== In popular media ==
The school is featured prominently in Magali García Ramis's novel Felices Días, Tío Sergio. The school was the main film location for the movie Casi casi (2006) and forms the basis for the fictional school featured in the film.

== Notable alumni ==
- Roy Brown, singer/songwriter
- Marisol Calero, actress and singer
- Salvador E. Casellas, United States district judge of the United States District Court for the District of Puerto Rico
- Mara Croatto, telenovela actress
- Michael Collins, test pilot and astronaut, Apollo 11 astronaut
- Cristina Córdova, sculptor
- Henry Darrow, actor
- Tommy Diablo, professional wrestler and lawyer
- Pablo Hernández Rivera, 21st Resident Commissioner of Puerto Rico
- Josie de Guzman, actress and singer
- Lawrence La Fountain-Stokes, scholar
- Magali García Ramis, writer
- Gustavo Gelpí, Federal Appellate Judge, 1st U.S. Circuit Court of Appeals
- Marian Pabón, actress
- Ana María Polo, lawyer/arbitrator
- Carlos Manuel Rodríguez Santiago, Catholic catechist and liturgist who was beatified by Pope John Paul II, hs image is depicted on one of the stained-glass windows on Our Lady of Perpetual Help Church next to the school
- Johanna Rosaly, actress, singer, and television host
- Gabriel Ríos, musician
- Pedro Rosselló, 7th Governor of Puerto Rico, medical doctor and politician
- Xavier Romeu, attorney and politician
- Benicio del Toro, Academy Award and Golden Globe Award winning actor
- Camille L. Vélez-Rivé, U.S. Magistrate Judge, United States district judge of the United States District Court for the District of Puerto Rico
- Myraida Chaves, actress
