= William Roberts McDaniel =

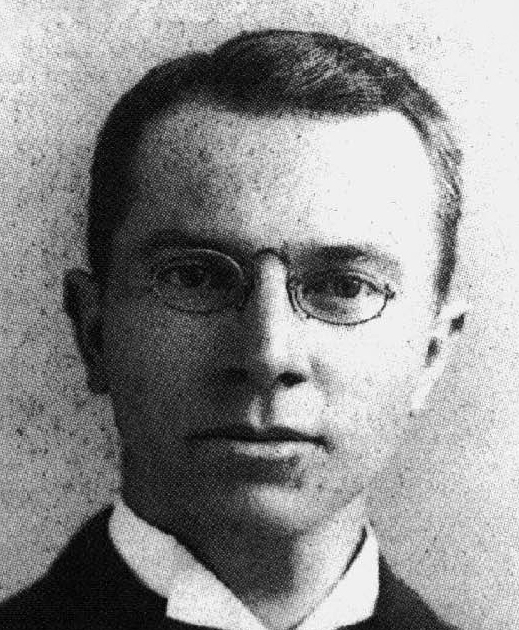
William Roberts McDaniel, c. 1900

William Roberts McDaniel (August 11, 1861 – April 19, 1942) is the namesake for McDaniel College in Westminster, Maryland.

== Biography ==
William Roberts McDaniel was born in Talbot County, Maryland. He was the youngest child of a non-traditional family having two brothers, five sisters, two half-brothers, and two half-sisters. His father, John Wesley Sedgewick McDaniel, was first married to Sarah Wrightson before marrying her sister, Ann. It was Ann who later gave birth to William and his siblings. When he was just sixteen and a sophomore, McDaniel matriculated into Western Maryland College. Upon graduation in 1880, McDaniel earned the position of salutatorian of his class.

McDaniel was an active member of the College's Alumni Association and received recognition for his outstanding service to his alma mater. Interrupting his doctorate from Johns Hopkins University and his studies with world-renowned British mathematician James Joseph Sylvester in 1885, he returned to school as a professor to fill in for Professor W.J. Thomas, who was ill. Thomas died three months after McDaniel took over, solidifying the position for McDaniel. After that, McDaniel continued to teach for 36 years. In 1888, after spending a summer at Harvard studying anatomy, hygiene, and gymnastics, McDaniel invented Club swinging, a form of exercise, which was discussed in his book Club Swinging by Note: A Method of Recording and Teaching Club Swings.

McDaniel was made treasurer of Western Maryland College in 1894 and maintained this position up until his death. In 1894, William McDaniel and Ada Smith were married in the home of Ada's brother in Westminster, Maryland. They lived in a home built by McDaniel College and located on its campus. This is where they raised their only child, Dorothy. McDaniel became vice president and acting president of McDaniel College in 1906 but declined the position of presidency in 1920 on account of his failing health. He died in 1942, aged 80.

== Remembrance ==
In 2002, Western Maryland College was renamed McDaniel College in recognition of his dedication to the School.
