= Joan Develin Coley =

American academic and educator

Joan Develin Coley is a former American higher education executive. She served as president of McDaniel College, Westminster, Maryland from 2000 to 2010. She was then appointed as interim president of Notre Dame of Maryland University, beginning in August 2013, and served in that capacity during the presidential search for that university.

A national higher education policy participant with the Aspen Institute, she was also actively involved with the Wye Faculty Seminar of the Association of American Colleges and Universities.

== Formative years ==
Born in Philadelphia, Pennsylvania, Coley earned her Bachelor of Arts degree in English with Honors at Albright College in Reading. She then earned both a Master of Education degree in Secondary Education Reading and her Doctor of Education degree in Elementary Education Reading from the University of Maryland, College Park.

== McDaniel College ==
Coley rose through the ranks of academia during her four-decade career, holding the following increasingly responsible positions:

- President – 2001
- Interim President – 2000
- Provost and Dean of the Faculty – 1994–2000
- Acting Vice President for Academic Affairs and Dean of the Faculty – 1993–94
- Dean of Graduate Affairs, Professor – 1992–93
- Professor, Chair of Education Dept. & Director of Graduate Reading Program – 1986–92
- Director of Admissions – 1985
- Associate Dean/Academic Affairs – 1983–85
- Director of Continuing Education – 1982
- Director, American Publishers Assn. Literacy Project, Washington, D.C. (sabbatical) — 1980–81
- Associate Professor, Education Dept. & Director Graduate Reading Program – 1977
- Assistant Professor, Education Dept. & Director Graduate Reading Program – 1973

== Accomplishments and honors ==
- Outstanding Teacher Educator in Reading given by the Maryland Council of the International Reading Association (1989)
- Good Scout Award, Boy Scouts of America (2010)
- Circle of Excellence, Top 100 Women in Maryland, Daily Record (2004)
- Top 100 Women in Maryland, Daily Record (2000, 2002)
- Outstanding Teacher Educator in Reading at the Higher Education Level (1989)
- Maryland Higher Education Reading Association, president (1975–76)
- Mid-Atlantic Reading Research Consortium, president (1987–99)
