= Alzheimer's Association, Central New York Chapter =

- Founded: 1980
- Type: NPO
- Location: Central New York
- Services: 24-hour helpline, care consultation, education and training, support groups, MedicAlert+Safe Return
- Fields: human services, Alzheimer's support, adult day program
- Key people: Catherine James, CEO, Larry Malfitano, Board of Directors President
- Website: http://www.alzcny.org

The Alzheimer's Association, Central New York Chapter, incorporated on August 1, 1982, as the Alzheimer's Disease and Related Disorders Association, Inc., is a non-profit voluntary health organization which focuses on care, support and research for Alzheimer's disease. The organization is a chapter affiliated with the national Alzheimer's Association.

== Mission ==
The mission of the Alzheimer's Association is: To eliminate Alzheimer's disease through the advancement of research; to provide and enhance care and support for all affected; and to reduce the risk of dementia through the promotion of brain health.

The vision of the Association is "a world without Alzheimer's disease."

== History ==
The Alzheimer's Association, Central New York Chapter was formed following a 1982 community meeting in Syracuse, New York, to address the growing Alzheimer's population. A steering committee led by the Metropolitan Committee on Aging and local doctors conducted a public hearing and found overwhelming public support for services. The chapter formed in August 1982 and earned provisional certification from the National Alzheimer's Association in August 1983.

The national Alzheimer's Association initiated a series of mergers after the year 2000, combining smaller, local chapters into larger regional organizations. As a result, the Mohawk Valley and Southern Tier Chapters were merged into the Central New York Chapter, creating a 14-county organization that stretches from the Canadian to the New York-Pennsylvania and from the Finger Lakes to the Adirondack foothills.

== Services ==
Community-based Alzheimer's Association chapters provide services to families and professionals, including information and referral, support groups, care consultation, education and safety services.

- The Alzheimer's Association offers a toll-free, 24/7 Helpline for Alzheimer information, referrals and support in multiple languages. It can be reached by calling 800-272-3900.
- It performs family care consultations, or one-on-one meetings to assist in care planning.
- The chapter offers support groups in more than 30 communities.
- Dementia experts lead education workshops for family members and professional caregivers.
- MedicAlert + Safe Return is the Association's 24-hour nationwide emergency response service for individuals with Alzheimer's or related dementia that wander or who have a medical emergency.

In addition, the chapter operates the Kirkpatrick Day Program, a social-model adult day program which serves up to 30 people per day. The program is located in the same building as the chapter office.

The Central New York Chapter has an office in Inner Harbor area of Syracuse—441 West Kirkpatrick Street.

== Chapter leadership ==
The chief executive officer of the Alzheimer's Association, Central New York Chapter is Catherine J. James. She has led the organization since February 2006. The chapter is led by a board of a directors.

== See also ==
- National Institute on Aging, a division of the U.S. National Institutes of Health
