= Maryland University of Integrative Health =

Private graduate school of alternative medicine

Coordinates: 39°9′57″N 76°53′18″W

- Former names: College of Chinese Acupuncture (1974-1978); Traditional Acupuncture Institute (1978-2000); Tai Sophia Institute (2000-2013)
- Active: 1974–2025
- Founder: Dianne Connelly; Robert Duggan
- Location: Laurel, Maryland, United States
- Website: muih.edu

Maryland University of Integrative Health (MUIH), formerly the Tai Sophia Institute, was a private graduate school specializing in Acupuncture, Traditional Chinese medicine and other types of alternative medicine in Laurel, Maryland. It was acquired by Notre Dame of Maryland University in 2024.

== History ==
The university was founded by Dianne Connelly and Robert Duggan in 1974 as the College of Chinese Acupuncture, U.S. In 1978, it was renamed Traditional Acupuncture Institute to train acupuncturists. In 2000, it was renamed the Tai Sophia Institute and expanded its offerings to include other forms of traditional medicine, such as yoga, acupressure and herbalism. In 2003, the institute moved to the Montpelier Research Park in Fulton on the site of the Montpelier Mansion (circa 1740) which was razed by Maple Lawn developers in 1996. In 2013, the Institute received approval from the state to offer graduate degrees and changed its name to the Maryland University of Integrative Health (MUIH) on March 1, 2013.

It was announced in October 2023 that the university would be acquired by Notre Dame of Maryland University in Baltimore. The university was to be absorbed into the new School of Integrated Health at Notre Dame of Maryland. In December 2024, the parties announced that they "continue to make progress during the transition period ... before final approval of a merger of MUIH into NDMU by the U.S. Department of Education (USDE). During the transition period, NDMU owns and continues to operate MUIH as a separately authorized and separately accredited postsecondary institution". The merger was completed in 2025.

== Academics ==
The university offered doctoral degrees, master's degrees, graduate certificates, post-master's certificates, post-bachelor's certificates, and continuing education in areas such as acupuncture, oriental medicine, holistic health, yoga therapy, and herbal studies.
