= Quincy Notre Dame High School =

Location
- 1400 South 11th Street; Quincy, Illinois 62301; United States; 39°54′52″N 91°23′57″W

Information
- Type: Private, Coeducational
- Religious affiliation: Roman Catholic
- Established: 1867
- Principal: Mark McDowell
- Grades: 9–12
- Average class size: 19
- Student to teacher ratio: 17:1
- Colors: navy blue Vegas gold white
- Mascot: Raiders
- Accreditation: Cognia
- Newspaper: The Broadcaster
- Yearbook: The Pride
- Website: quincynotredame.org

Quincy Notre Dame High School is a private, Roman Catholic co-educational high school in Quincy, Illinois, United States, founded in 1867, serving upper school students in grades 9-12. It is located in the Roman Catholic Diocese of Springfield in Illinois. The curriculum is college preparatory.

== History ==
Historically, private upper school Catholic education in Quincy was separated between schools for boys and girls. The predecessor to Notre Dame was established as a girls' school in 1859, while the Quincy College Academy was established as the boys' preparatory school. In 1859, a local bishop invited the School Sisters of Notre Dame to teach in the town. First known as the Convent School of Infant Jesus, it was chartered by the state in 1873 as the Saint Mary Institute. When the Quincy College Academy closed, the boys were given temporary acceptance to Notre Dame with the idea that a new boys' academy would be established. They actually ended up staying from 1940 until 1959, when Christian Brothers High School was formed (which changed names again in 1970 to Catholic Boys High School). In 1976 the schools re-merged and became the current Notre Dame High School.

== Academics ==
Annually, about 98% of Notre Dame graduates enroll in college programs. The school follows a traditional liberal arts curriculum of language arts, fine arts, mathematics, the sciences, foreign languages, philosophy and theology. Mental, physical and social growth are all a central part of the school's values and are incorporated into the students' education.

While a Roman Catholic school, the student body is not exclusively Catholic, with a portion regularly coming from other faiths.

The school's mission statement: Founded on Catholic values, Quincy Notre Dame High School educates lifelong learners for lives of service.

== Notable alumni ==
- Kevin Deters, Emmy award-winning director
- Jim Finigan, Major League Baseball Player and 2-time All-Star
- Frances A. Karnes, academic, educator, and writer
- Caren Kemner, U.S. Olympic Volleyball Team Captain and 1992 bronze medalist
- Cheri Preston, radio anchor, ABC News
- D. A. Weibring, professional golfer, currently playing on the Champions Tour
- Jack Cornell, professional American football player for the Oakland Raiders, 2-year starter at University of Illinois
- Michael Swango, serial killer

== Athletics and activities ==
Notre Dame High School is a member school in the Illinois High School Association. Their mascot is the Raiders, with school colors of navy, vegas gold, and white.

The school has 30 state championships on record in team athletics and activities:

- Boys' Golf: 1997-1998 (A), 1998-1999 (A)
- Boys' Soccer: 1985-1986, 2011-2012, 2018–2019 (1A)
- Girls' Basketball: 1982-1983 (A), 1983-1984 (A), 2010-2011 (2A), 2011-2012 (2A), 2012-2013 (3A), 2021-2022 (2A)
- Girls' Soccer: 2009-2010 (1A), 2011-2012 (1A), 2012-2013 (1A), 2016-2017 (1A), 2021-2022 (1A)
- Girls' Softball: 1980-1981, 1981-1982, 1983-1984
- Girls' Volleyball: 1978-1979 (A), 1980-1981 (A), 1998-1999 (A), 2011-2012 (2A)
- Girl's Pom: IDTA Class A Pom State Championships: 2011-2012, 2012-2013, 2013–2014, 2014-2015, 2015-2016, 2016–2017, 2017-2018, 2018-2019, 2019–2020
