= Cristina Córdova =

American sculptor (born 1976)

- Born: 1976 (age 49–50); Boston, Massachusetts, U.S.
- Occupation: Sculptor
- Known for: Ceramics
- Website: www.cristinacordova.com

Cristina Córdova (born 1976) is an American sculptor, of Afro-Puerto Rican heritage. She lives in Penland, North Carolina. Primarily working in clay, she focuses her work on expressive, emotional, and sometimes fantastical human figural sculptures. They are inspired by her heritage, gender, politics, and the complexities of human relationships with their surroundings. "Magic realism, the predominantly Latin American literary genre, is physically manifested through the surrealistic environments Córdova's subjects inhabit."

Influenced by the Catholic iconography of her youth in San Juan, Córdova now aims to create figures of her "own pantheon" while trying to emulate a figure representative of and recognizable by her own culture. The sculptures are shown in a variety of poses, expressions, colors, textures, and sizes. Córdova has won many awards, exhibited her work broadly, and her work is owned by both domestic and international museums.

== Early life and education ==
Cristina Córdova was born in 1976, in Boston, Massachusetts. Her parents were Puerto Ricans completing their studies in Medicine at Harvard University. They returned to Puerto Rico when she was 6 months old.

Córdova graduated in 1994 from the Academia del Perpetuo Socorro, Miramar, Puerto Rico, and earned a B.A. magna cum laude and a concentration in Fine Arts from the University of Puerto Rico, Mayaguez Campus. During the summer of 1999 she finished courses at Touchtone School of Crafts at the New York State College of Ceramics at Alfred University. In the summer of 1999 she completed workshop courses at the Haystack Mountain School of Crafts in Deer Isle, Maine. She graduated with a MFA degree in 2002 in ceramics at the New York State College of Ceramics at Alfred University.

== Career ==
Araña (2004) by Cristina Córdova at the Renwick Gallery in Washington, D.C.

Córdova was on track to becoming an engineer when she realized that it wasn't for her. She switched to art school, where she could pursue her interest in ceramics. After graduating in 2002 she was selected to serve as a resident artist at Penland School of Crafts. Córdova moved to Penland, North Carolina to participate in the residency in 2002. After completing her residency she and her family made their home and studio on the Penland campus where she maintains her studio and offers workshops.

"Córdova doesn't want to be labeled a Puerto Rican artist – or a woman artist, or any type of artist, other than a compelling one – she does believe authenticity can come only from a deeply personal place." Her Afro-Caribbean heritage and her understanding of contemporary and historical influences have impacted her art form. Her knowledge of early Roman life and African sculptures are also reflected in her figures. Among the artists which have impacted her work are Doug Jeck, Judy Fox, Jaime Suarez and Susana Espinosa. She comments about her own work that "we are all taking from a collective creativity."

The human figure is key to her work which has been described as "a compelling strain of magical realism ... laden with ideas of creation, crucifixion and difficult nature of existence." She works primarily with clay but has an interest in working with other mediums. Her moldings recreate various human forms, often female. She has also recreated animal-like creatures. At the abstract level, her figures, represent the struggles in the world of today. Cordóva weaves the past with the present as she creates a place for the viewer to complete the narrative in her work.

“I was born into a household that both challenged and upheld gender archetypes. This simultaneity created a fluid identity in my creative perspective that has moved me to engage with a wide spectrum of narrative embodiments from the sexually untethered and universal to the absolutely feminine. I am human, I am Puerto Rican, I am a woman. Each of these breaks into a thousand fractals that create the prism through which my work comes into the world.” Cordova's more recent description of her work and process shows a coalescence and embracing of heritage and gender.

Córdova's work is in the collection of the Mint Museum Auxiliary, and the Museo de Arte de Puerto Rico, Her work, Araña, was acquired by the Smithsonian American Art Museum as part of the Renwick Gallery's 50th Anniversary Campaign.

== Awards ==
Cordova was given 2010 Virginia Groot Foundation Recognition Award. In 2026, she was named a fellow by the American Craft Council (ACC).

- 2012 Mint Museum of Craft and Design Project 10/10/10, permanent collection commission recipient
- 2009 Best Art Exhibit: Cristina Córdova At Hodges Taylor. Creative Loafing Arts and Entertainment Magazine, Charlotte, North Carolina, United States
- 2008 AICA Award (International Association of Art Critics): “Best Ceramic Sculpture Exhibition” for “Hacia otro mar”, Pamil Fine Art, San Juan, Puerto Rico
- 2007 AICA Award (International Association of Art Critics): "Best Ceramic Sculpture Exhibition" for "Fábulas de la Fascinación II", Pamil Fine Art, San Juan, Puerto Rico

== Exhibitions ==
=== Group exhibitions ===
- 2022–2023, "This Present Moment: Crafting a Better World", Renwick Gallery of the Smithsonian American Art Museum (SAAM), Washington D.C., May 13, 2022 – April 2, 2023

== Publications ==
- 2022: "Mastering Sculpture: The Figure in Clay: A Guide to Capturing the Human Form for Ceramic Artists", Quarry Books, April 2022
- 2014: “Ceramic Top 40”, Ferrin, Leslie, Ferrin Contemporary, 2014.
- 2012: “The Body Eloquent”, Lovelace, Joyce. American Craft magazine, Feb/March 2012.
- 2012: “Retablos, joyas, plateria y arte colección acosta de San Juan, Puerto Rico (1695-2010)”, Acosta Stolberg, Robert, Editorial Reves, November 2012.
- 2010: “Art Market Insights: Art at the Crossroads”, O’hern, John. American Art Collector, Issue 39, January 2010.
- 2010: “Cristina Córdova”, Howley, Paul. The Laurel of Asheville, July 2010
- 2009: “Cristina Córdova: Entre Tierra”, Sanz De Arellano López, Isabel P., Imágen, mayo 2009.
- 2009: “Umbral de lo surreal”, García Benítez, Mariana. Arq.i.tec 3.4, junio 2009.
- 2009: “ENTRE TIERRA: Nueva escultura en cerámica por Cristina Córdova (English/Español)”, Fred Rivera, Ivette y Ramos Collado, Lilliana, ARTES (artesrp.com), mayo 2009.
- 2008: “Possibilities: Rising Stars of Contemporary Craft in North Carolina”, Dobbs Ariatl, Kate, American Craft Magazine, October–November 2008.
- 2007: “Creadora de enigmas”, El Nuevo Dia, 14 de diciembre del 2007.
- 2007: “Cristina Córdova: Magic Realism”, Feaster, Felicia. Creative Loafing, May 2007.
- 2006: “From the Inside Out—Two Views on the Creation and Experience of Cristina Cordova's Clay Sculptures”, Schultz, Katey and Hillman, Linda. Ceramics Art in Perception, 2006.
- 2006: “Reviews: Cristina Cordova”, Dobbs Ariail, Kate. American Craft, September– August 2006.
- 2005: “Body Language”, Camper, Fred. Chicago Reader, May 2005.
- 2005: “The Figure in Clay”, Tourtillot, Suzanne. Lark Books, 2005.
- 2004: “Dark Horse”, Lucas, Scott. Creative Loafing, May 2004.
- 2004: “500 Figures in Clay”, Editor Gunther, Verónica Alice. Lark Books, 2004.
- 2004: “Transformation”, Shearing, Graham. American Craft, June/July 2004.
- 2004: “Cristina Cordova: Mito, Memoria y lluvia”, Trelles, Rafael. El Nuevo Dia, March 2004.
- 2003: “Enamorada de la cerámica", Alegre Barrios, Mario. El Nuevo Dia, 2003.
- 2002: “Celebracion Femenina”, Alvarez Lezama, Manuel. El Nuevo Dia, 2002.
- 2001: “Cristina Córdova: Mujeres Santas y Renacimientos”, Rodriguez, Jorge. El Vocero, 2001.
- 2000: “My Experiences and Impressions”, Xiaoping, Luo. Sculpture, 2000.3, vol. 23, 2000.
- 2000: “Cerámica Escultural”, Alvarez Lezama, Manuel. El Nuevo Día, 2000.
