= Notre Dame of Maryland University =

Private university in Baltimore, Maryland, US

Coordinates: 39.352°N 76.622°W

- Former names: Notre Dame of Maryland Preparatory School and Collegiate Institute (1873–1895); College of Notre Dame of Maryland (1895–2011)
- Motto: Veritatem Prosequimur
- Motto in English: We Pursue Truth
- Type: Private university
- Established: 1873; 153 years ago
- Accreditation: Middle States Commission on Higher Education
- Religious affiliation: Roman Catholic (School Sisters of Notre Dame)
- Academic affiliations: ACCU; NAICU; CIC
- Endowment: $35.8 million (2019)
- President: Abagail Van Vlerah
- Provost: Martha Walker
- Faculty: 264
- Students: 1,836
- Undergraduates: 686
- Postgraduates: 1,150
- Location: Baltimore, Maryland, U.S.
- Campus: 58 acres (23 ha); Urban
- Colors: Navy blue & white
- Nickname: Gators
- Sporting affiliations: NCAA Division III – UEC
- Website: ndm.edu

Notre Dame of Maryland University is a private Catholic university in Baltimore, Maryland, United States. NDMU offers certificate, undergraduate, and graduate programs for women and men.

== History ==
The Roman Catholic academic/educational religious congregation of the School Sisters of Notre Dame founded the school in 1873. It originally established and named the "Notre Dame of Maryland Preparatory School and Collegiate Institute".

Originally founded as a preparatory school (today's equivalent of elementary, middle, and high schools), the "College of Notre Dame of Maryland" was raised to the level of a four-year college for undergraduates in 1895. The lower preparatory school (high school in modern terminology) moved from CND's North Charles Street location to its current campus further north in suburban Baltimore County at the county seat of Towson in 1960, and is now known as Notre Dame Preparatory School.

In 1896, the Collegiate Institute became the first four-year Roman Catholic college for women in the United States.

In 2011, the College of Notre Dame of Maryland attained university status with the addition of several graduate-level programs and changed its name to Notre Dame of Maryland University with the approval of the state legislature, the General Assembly of Maryland, accrediting agencies, and the Catholic Church in the state. Previously a women's college, the board of trustees voted unanimously to become co-educational in September 2022 and admitted its first undergraduate men in the fall semester of 2023. Many students and alumnae did not want the university to become coeducational and protested the board's decision.

In October 2023, the university announced that it will be acquiring the Maryland University of Integrative Health (MUIH) in Laurel, Maryland. The programs from MUIH were anticipated to become part of a new School of Integrative Health by the end of 2024. In December 2024, the parties announced that they "continue to make progress during the transition period ... before final approval of a merger of MUIH into NDMU by the U.S. Department of Education (USDE). During the transition period, NDMU owns and continues to operate MUIH as a separately authorized and separately accredited postsecondary institution". The merger was completed in 2025.

=== Presidents ===
1. Theophila Bauer (1895–1904)
2. Florentine Riley (1904–1919)
3. Philemon Doyle (1919–1929)
4. Ethelbert Roache (1929–1935)
5. Frances Smith (1935–1950)
6. Margaret Mary O'Connell, '26 (1950–1968)
7. Elissa McGuire, '45 (1968–1971)
8. Kathleen Feeley, '50 (1971–1992)
9. Rosemarie Nassif (1992–1996)
10. Interim: Dorothy M. Brown (1996–1997)
11. Mary Pat Seurkamp (1997–2012)
12. James F. Conneely (2012–2013)
13. Interim: Joan Develin Coley (2013–2014)
14. Marylou Yam (2014–2026)
15. Abagail Van Vlerah (2026- )

== Campus ==
Notre Dame of Maryland's campus is located on North Charles Street, the main commercial/business and cultural street leading north to the formerly rural, now suburban Baltimore County from downtown Baltimore. NDMU is situated between the wealthy residential neighborhoods from the early 20th Century of Homeland and Guilford, just north of the cross-town, Cold Spring Lane, and adjacent to the campus of Loyola University Maryland (formerly Loyola College) to the south (occupied since 1922). It borders to the south, Evergreen Museum & Library, the historic landmark Greek Revival styled mansion of the Garrett family.

Adjacent to the Montrose House (1850) on the original property site purchased by the School Sisters of Notre Dame, one of the first buildings, "Gibbons Hall," was constructed in an "L-shaped" structure. It surmounted by its landmark white wooden tower, and opened in 1873 and became the landmark site symbolizing "Notre Dame of Maryland," which offered instruction to girls and young women. Gibbons Hall was named for the then incumbent Archbishop of Baltimore and second American Cardinal of the Church, James Gibbons.

The university's Marikle Chapel of the Annunciation was originally designed by notable architects Ephraim Francis Baldwin and Josias Pennington. It was restored in 2002. Fourier Hall is an example of Art Moderne architecture. The renamed "Noyes Alumnae House", which was the former Montrose estate of a red brick Greek Revival style of architecture was built in 1850, on the southwest corner of the campus. Several buildings on the campus were designed by architect George Archer

The university shares a library with the neighboring Loyola University Maryland. The Loyola/Notre Dame Library was built primarily in a valley on land primarily owned by Notre Dame of Maryland and located between the two Roman Catholic campuses, with a road access to the east to York Road (Maryland Route 45) and the Govans community.

Some courses from the College of Adult Undergraduate Studies and College of Graduate Studies are offered at off-site locations, including: Anne Arundel Community College, College of Southern Maryland, Northeast Maryland Higher Education Center, Laurel College Center, and Southern Maryland Higher Education Center.

== Academics ==
In 2014, Notre Dame had 1,254 undergraduate students and 1,647 graduate students, 140 of whom were enrolled in the School of Pharmacy. The university offered 29 undergraduate majors along with interdisciplinary minors, certificates and five-year Bachelor of Arts(BA)/Master of Arts and BA/Master of Arts in Teaching programs. The university also has undergraduate programs such as the Morrissy Honors Program and Trailblazers, a support program for first-generation college students, in addition to pre-professional programs including pre-law, pre-medical, and pre-pharmacy.

The university's College of Adult Undergraduate Studies offers ten majors and features part-time flexible and accelerated schedules for working adults who are pursuing bachelor's degrees. The College of Graduate Studies provides coeducational weekend and evening classes in education, management, contemporary communication and nonprofit management, a Ph.D. in Instructional Leadership for Changing Populations, and a Doctor of Pharmacy.

The university offers two noncredit programs:

- The English Language Institute provides instruction in English language and American culture for international students, professionals and visitors to the United States. The majority of these students are in their mid- to late twenties.
- The Renaissance Institute is a voluntary association of women and men age 50 and older who pursue study of a variety of topics on a not-for-credit basis. Courses have included: literature, public affairs, writing, history, philosophy, music, art, languages, tai chi, film, science, computers, travel, strength and balance, dance and acting.

== Athletics ==
Notre Dame's athletic teams are members of the Division III of the National Collegiate Athletic Association (NCAA). Notre Dame of Maryland has eight NCAA women's sports: basketball, field hockey, lacrosse, soccer, softball, swimming, tennis and volleyball and two men's sports: soccer and basketball. All sports but swimming joined the Colonial States Athletic Conference (CSAC) starting in the 2007-2008 academic year. Although the swim team does not compete within a conference, it participates in the yearly Old Dominion Athletic Conference (ODAC) swim championships. The 2009 season was the first time that the Notre Dame softball team competed in NCAA Division III. The CSAC merged into the United East Conference (UEC) in July 2023.

Notre Dame of Maryland University's mascot is the Gator. A redesigned logo for the university and its athletic teams was unveiled in May 2010.

== Notable alumni ==
- Audrey J. Carrion, (Class of 1981) Judge, Circuit Court for Baltimore City
- Marta Cunningham, (Class of 1887 – when Notre Dame was still a high school) singer and philanthropist
- Kathleen Feeley, (Class of 1962) – president of Notre Dame of Maryland University (1971–1992)
- Brigadier General Elizabeth P. Hoisington, (Class of 1940) one of the first woman generals in the U.S. Army
- Frances Benjamin Johnston, (Class of 1883 – when Notre Dame was called Notre Dame of Maryland Collegiate Institute for Young Ladies) photographer
- Kit Reed, (Class of 1954) author
- Susan Love, (Class of 1970) breast cancer surgeon and author
- L. Paige Marvel, (Class of 1971), senior judge of the United States Tax Court
- Shelley Puhak, (Class 1997) poet

== See also ==
- National Catholic Educational Association
