= Xavier Romeu =

Puerto Rican politician

Xavier Romeu Matta is a counselor and litigator, with expertise in securities litigation and regulation, and corporate, commercial and employment litigation. He is a former politician, and an advocate of statehood for Puerto Rico, and of the appointment of Puerto Rican-Americans to the federal bench, most notably of current Associate Justice of the United States Supreme Court, Sonia Sotomayor, whom he served as a law clerk.

== Biography ==
Mr. Romeu was born and raised in Puerto Rico where his family resided since 1813. Following graduation from the Academia del Perpetuo Socorro in Miramar, received a M.B.A. degree from Duke University in 2003, he attended Haverford College in Pennsylvania, where he was Secretary, Vice President and President of the Student Council. Earned a Juris doctor from the Columbia Law School in 1990.

As a student leader, Mr. Romeu pushed and obtained the approval by the Board of Directors of funding of a new student center (currently, the John C. Whitehead student center). He also led in the fight for weight room/ sport facilities and for funding of Skeeters, the student-run pizza business. He was a strong supporter of self-governing by students and actively opposed the college administration on a proposed campus-wide alcohol ban. He successfully advocated for accountability and individual responsibility for social events on campus. Mr. Romeu was graduated with Honors in Philosophy.

He lives and works in New York and is married, has a daughter, and continues to strongly advocate on Puerto Rican matters, and for equality for the U.S citizens of the Territory of Puerto Rico.

In May 2010 he was invited to testify before the White House Taskforce on Puerto Rico on the subject of economic development strategies for the island and the inextricable relationship between economic development and status. Mr. Romeu explained that the island's colonial status has served as fertile ground for federal tax subsidies to the pharmaceutical and manufacturing industry for revenues realized, and patents held, in the U.S. Territory, but that the exceptions no longer increase job creation. Mr. Romeu advocated extension of a wage and job based tax credit, instead of revenue based corporate tax subsidy, and extension of empowerment zone status to all of Puerto Rico.

== Public office ==
Xavier Romeu chaired the HNBA Governmental Affairs Committee. In that capacity, in 1998, he led the national coalition that broke the Republican Senate's hold on Judge Sonia Sotomayor's nomination to the United States Court of Appeals for the Second Circuit

== Honors and recognition ==
- The Puerto Rico Institute Lifetime Achievement Award
- National Hispanic Corporate Achievers, Western Hemisphere Achiever of the Year
- Frank Torres Commitment to Diversity Award, Association of Judges of Hispanic Heritage
- Honorable Felipe N. Torres Award for Outstanding Latino Attorney of the Year
