= Institute of Notre Dame =

- Entrance to the Institute of Notre Dame

Location
- 901 Aisquith Street; Baltimore, Maryland 21202; United States; 39°18′2″N 76°36′6″W

Information
- Type: Private, All-Female
- Religious affiliation: Roman Catholic
- Established: 1847
- Status: closed
- Closed: 2020
- Grades: 9–12
- Average class size: 16-18
- Student to teacher ratio: 8:1
- Colors: Blue and white
- Sports: Soccer, Volleyball, Field Hockey, Cross Country, Crew, Basketball, Cheerleading, Swimming, Badminton, Track and Field, Softball, Lacrosse
- Mascot: Penguin
- Accreditation: Middle States Association of Colleges and Schools
- Publication: Garland (literary magazine)
- Newspaper: wINDows
- Yearbook: Clarissian
- Website: web.archive.org/*/https://www.indofmd.org

The Institute of Notre Dame was a private Catholic all-girls high school located in Baltimore, Maryland. After 173 years, the school closed on June 30, 2020.

== History ==
The Institute of Notre Dame, known as "IND" or "the Institute" by those who are familiar with the school, was founded in 1847, making it the first school founded by the School Sisters of Notre Dame in the United States. The founder of the school was Mother Theresa Gerhardinger, now beatified in the Catholic Church. The school remained in its downtown location on Aisquith Street for its entire history. As of its closure, around 286 young women attended the school.

In September 2010, IND was named Best Private School for the "Wi-Fi" Generation" by Baltimore magazine for its one-to-one student tablet PC program, which integrates technology across the curriculum. The historic building is fully wireless.

In 2000, Spanish teacher William Brown won a national award from National Catholic Educators Association for his efforts in education and conflict mediation at the school.

The school also had a partnership with Johns Hopkins Hospital called "Bond to Bond", where students volunteer in different areas of the hospital.Dome | Johns Hopkins Medicine

The Institute of Notre Dame was very well known for its rivalry with Mercy High School. Once a year, the two schools' basketball teams matched up to play a game in the Towson SECU Arena gym. To fans, this game is known as 'The Game' or the 'IND/Mercy Game'. Over 4000 people have been known to attend. As of 2019, the series stood at IND 24, Mercy 30.

Alumna Barbara Mikulski, member of the class of 1954, had this to say about the school:

"Attending the Institute of Notre Dame taught me that I could do anything I dreamed of doing. The sisters were intelligent, caring and had incredible inner strength. They taught me more than geography or mathematics; they taught me to help those in need of help. They inspired my passion for service."

On May 5, 2020, the Institute of Notre Dame announced they were scheduled to close permanently on June 30, 2020, due to COVID-19 and $5 million in structural damage from a church fire that occurred next door to the school in March 2020. Giulia McDonnell Nieto del Rio described it as among the highest profile Catholic school closures of the year.

== In film and television ==
Over the course of the summer of 2008, the film My One and Only was partially filmed in the school. The movie was released in 2009.

== Closure ==
On May 5, 2020, the school announced that it would close on June 30, 2020. In 2021, a group of alumnae, teachers, and former staff created a group called Saving IND and developed a plan to find a new location as the School Sisters of Notre Dame resisted efforts to reopen. A new name of Marian Preparatory Academy was selected since the old school's name, logo and seal are all owned by the School Sisters of Notre Dame. No information about a location or opening have been announced.

== Notable alumnae ==
- Nancy Pelosi, Speaker of the United States House of Representatives (first woman in US history to be so); 1958 graduate
- Catherine "Cassie" Mackin, NBC Newsanchor, NBC's first woman floor reporter at the Democratic and Republican presidential conventions, ABC news correspondent, two-time Emmy award winner for television journalism; 1956 graduate
- Barbara Mikulski, member of United States Senate representing Maryland, the senior U.S. senator from Maryland, longest-serving female senator and the longest-serving woman in the history of the U.S. Congress; 1954 graduate
- Carolyn Mignini, Miss Teenage America 1965, actress; 1965 graduate
- Lauren Parkes, Miss Black Delaware USA 2007, Miss Maryland Galaxy 2008; 2005 graduate
- Phylicia Porter, member of Baltimore City Council representing District 10 since 2020; 2006 graduate
- Dierra Martin, Baltimore, MD/ Atlanta Georgia Realtor and Investor; 2019 Graduate

== See also ==
- National Catholic Educational Association
