= Central Booking =

Central Booking may refer to:

- Central Booking, a 2013 album by The Deafening and Lena Hall
- "Central Booking", a song by John Vanderslice from the 2007 album Emerald City
- Central Booking, a book arts center in Brooklyn
- Central Booking, a correctional intake facility such as the one at Baltimore City District Courthouses#Central Booking
