= John R. Hargrove Sr. =

American judge

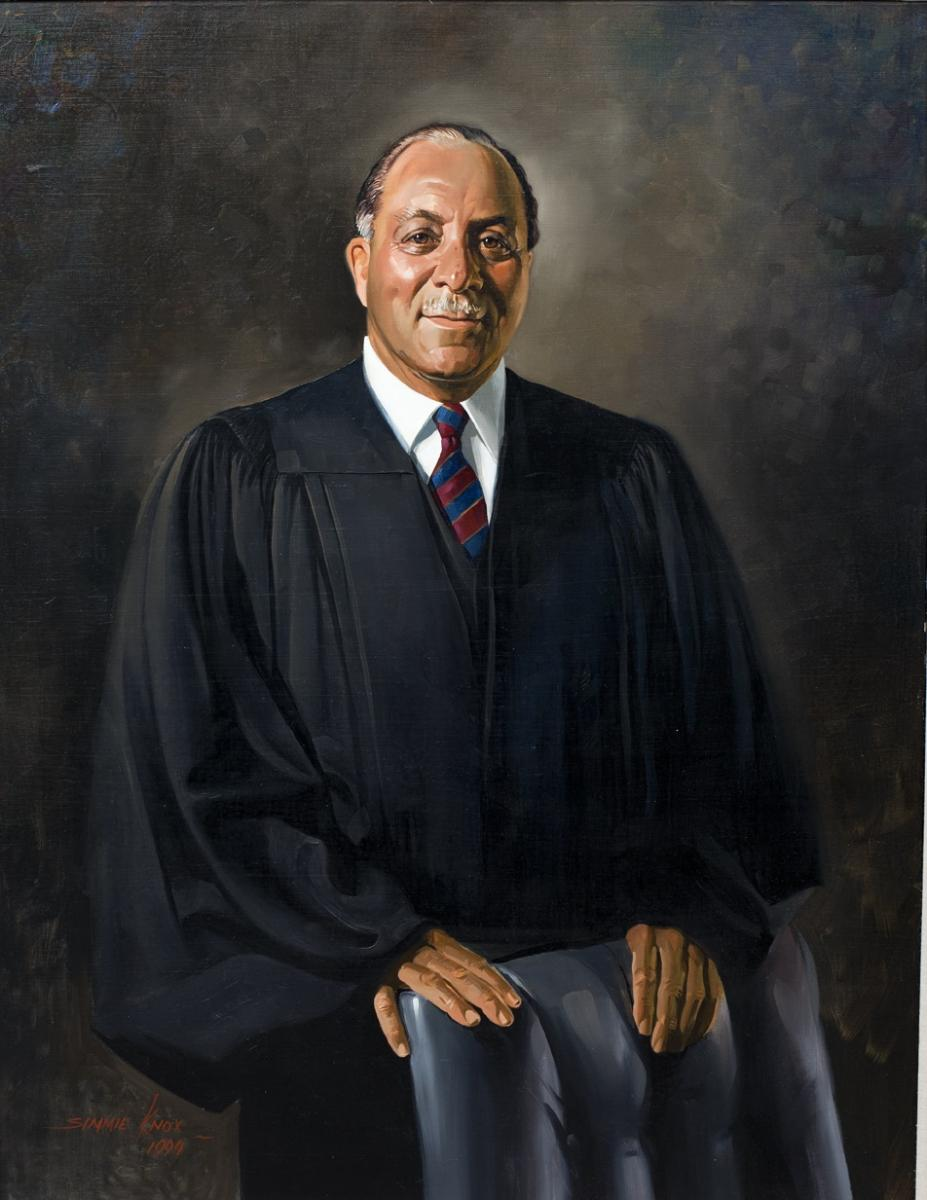

Senior Judge of the United States District Court for the District of Maryland
- In office February 21, 1994 – April 1, 1997

Judge of the United States District Court for the District of Maryland
- In office February 10, 1984 – February 21, 1994
- Appointed by: Ronald Reagan
- Preceded by: Shirley Brannock Jones
- Succeeded by: Catherine C. Blake

Associate Judge of the Supreme Bench of Baltimore City
- In office 1974–1984
- Appointed by: Marvin Mandel

Judge of the District Court of Maryland for Baltimore City
- In office 1968–1974

Personal details
- Born: John R. Hargrove; October 25, 1923 Atlantic City, New Jersey
- Died: April 1, 1997 (aged 73) Ashburton, Baltimore, Maryland
- Education: Howard University (B.A.); University of Maryland School of Law (LL.B.)

John R. Hargrove Sr. (October 25, 1923 – April 1, 1997) was the first African American to be appointed Assistant United States Attorney for the District of Maryland and was later appointed by President Ronald Reagan to be a United States district judge of the United States District Court for the District of Maryland.

== Education and career ==
Hargrove was born in Atlantic City, New Jersey, the first son of Georgine and Raymond Hargrove. When he was six months old, the family moved to Baltimore, Maryland. He attended Saint Catherine's Academy (now Saint Pius School), and graduated from Douglass High School in 1941. After high school, he entered Morgan State College in Baltimore. His studies were interrupted by World War II when he joined the military service. He served in the United States Army Corps of Engineers from 1943 to 1946 where he attained the rank of sergeant. After the war he graduated from Howard University where he received his Bachelor of Arts degree in 1947. Hargrove graduated from the University of Maryland School of Law with a Bachelor of Laws in 1950 and was admitted to the bar the same year. In 1957 he became the first African-American to be appointed Assistant United States Attorney for the District of Maryland, serving in that capacity for five years. In 1967, Hargrove was elected as a delegate to the Maryland Constitutional Convention in Annapolis.

== State judicial service ==

In 1962, he was appointed Judge of the old People's Court, where he served for a brief time before losing an election for the position. The next year he and Joseph C. Howard Sr. formed the law firm of Howard and Hargrove, where he practiced law until 1968. In 1968 he was appointed Judge of the old Municipal Court of Baltimore City. The old Municipal Court became the District Court of Maryland for Baltimore City in 1971, at which time he was named the first Administrative Judge for the newly formed District Court. In 1974, he was appointed Associate Judge of the Supreme Bench of Baltimore City (now the Circuit Court for Baltimore City), where he served until 1984.

== Federal judicial service ==
Hargrove was nominated by President Ronald Reagan on January 30, 1984, to a seat on the United States District Court for the District of Maryland vacated by Judge Shirley Brannock Jones. He was confirmed by the United States Senate on February 9, 1984, and received commission on February 10, 1984. He assumed senior status on February 21, 1994. His service terminated on April 1, 1997, due to death.

== Legacy ==
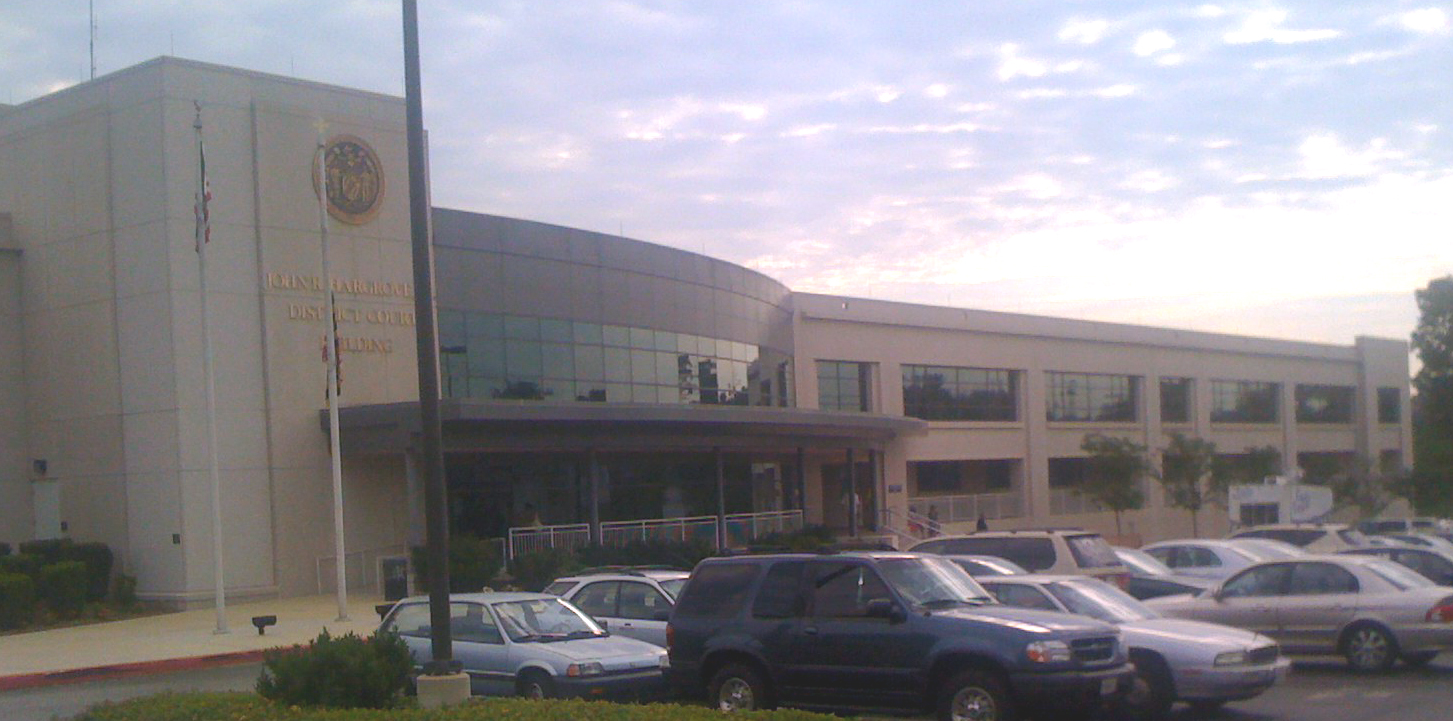
John R. Hargrove Sr. District Court Building

The newest of the Baltimore City District Courthouses is the John R. Hargrove Sr. Building, located at 700 E. Patapsco Avenue in southern Baltimore City. Ground for this new courthouse was broken in 2001, and it is named in honor of the late Judge John R. Hargrove Sr., who died April 1, 1997. His son John Raymond Hargrove Jr. was appointed to the District Court of Maryland for Baltimore City by Governor Parris Glendening in 1998.

== See also ==
- List of African-American federal judges
- List of African-American jurists

Legal offices
Preceded by Shirley Brannock Jones	Judge of the United States District Court for the District of Maryland; 1984–1994	Succeeded by Catherine C. Blake
