= John Sterett Gittings =

John Sterett Gittings could refer to:

- John Sterett Gittings (1798-1879) of Baltimore, Maryland
- John Sterett Gittings (1848-1926), his grandson
- John Sterett Gittings, Jr. (1888-1961), his great-grandson
