= Arlington, Baltimore =

Arlington
- neighborhood statistical area
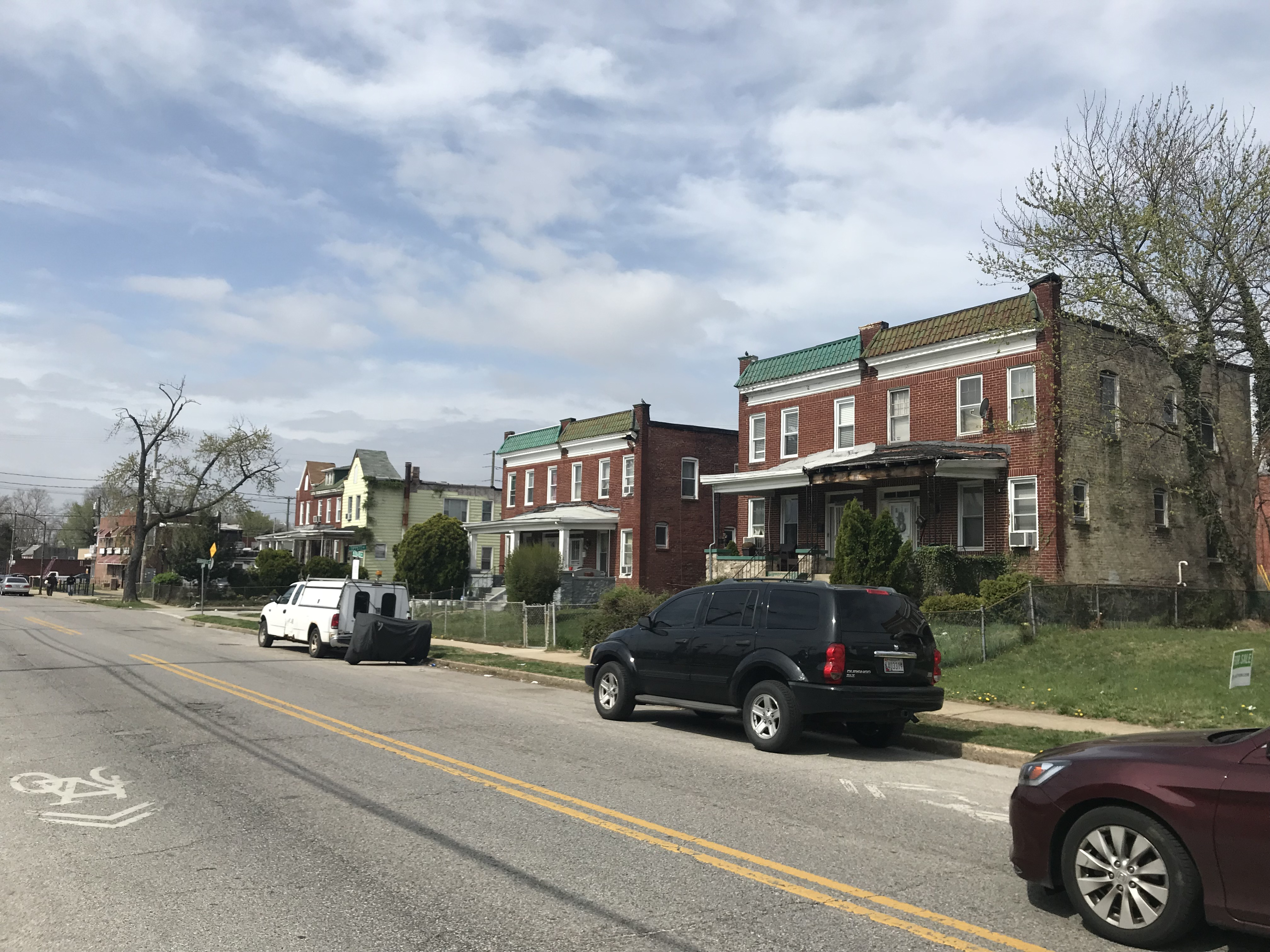
- Rowhouses along West Rogers Avenue in Arlington, Baltimore

- Location within Baltimore
- Coordinates: 39°20′53.42″N 76°40′55.96″W
- Country: United States
- State: Maryland
- City: Baltimore

Area
  - Total: .229 sq mi (0.59 km^{2})
  - Land: .229 sq mi (0.59 km^{2})

Population (2009)
  - Total: 3,065
- Time zone: UTC-5 (Eastern)
  - Summer (DST): UTC-4 (EDT)
- ZIP code: 21215
- Area code: 410, 443, and 667

Arlington is a neighborhood in Northwest Baltimore, Maryland. Major streets running through the area include Wabash Avenue, Rogers Avenue, Dolfield Avenue, and West Belvedere Avenue. Two Baltimore Metro Subway stations, Rogers Avenue and West Coldspring are located in the area.

== History ==
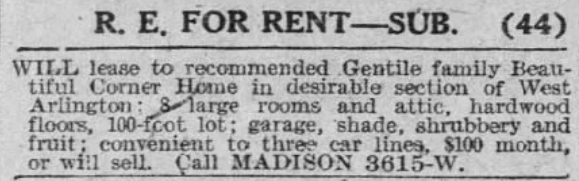
1923 Baltimore Sun advertisement seeking a "recommended Gentile family" for housing in West Arlington.

Prior to the passage of the Fair Housing Act of 1968, racial covenants were used in Baltimore to exclude African-Americans, Jews, and other minorities. A 1920 Baltimore Sun advertisement offered housing in West Arlington only for a "recommended Gentile family".

== Demographics ==
Arlington, along nearby Pikesville, is home to a large Russian-American population.

As of the late 1990s, Arlington was home to a population of 6,000 Russian-speaking Jews from Russia, Ukraine, and elsewhere in Eastern Europe. By 2003, some 20,000 Jews of Russian origin lived in the Baltimore region, predominantly in Northwest Baltimore and nearby neighborhoods of Baltimore County.

== Notable residents ==
Notable current and former residents of Arlington include:

- Sidney W. Bijou (1908–2009), developmental psychologist.

== See also ==
- List of Baltimore neighborhoods
