= Wabash Avenue (Baltimore, Maryland) =

Coordinates: 39°20′34″N 76°41′26″W

Wabash Avenue Hilton Road/Parkway/Street
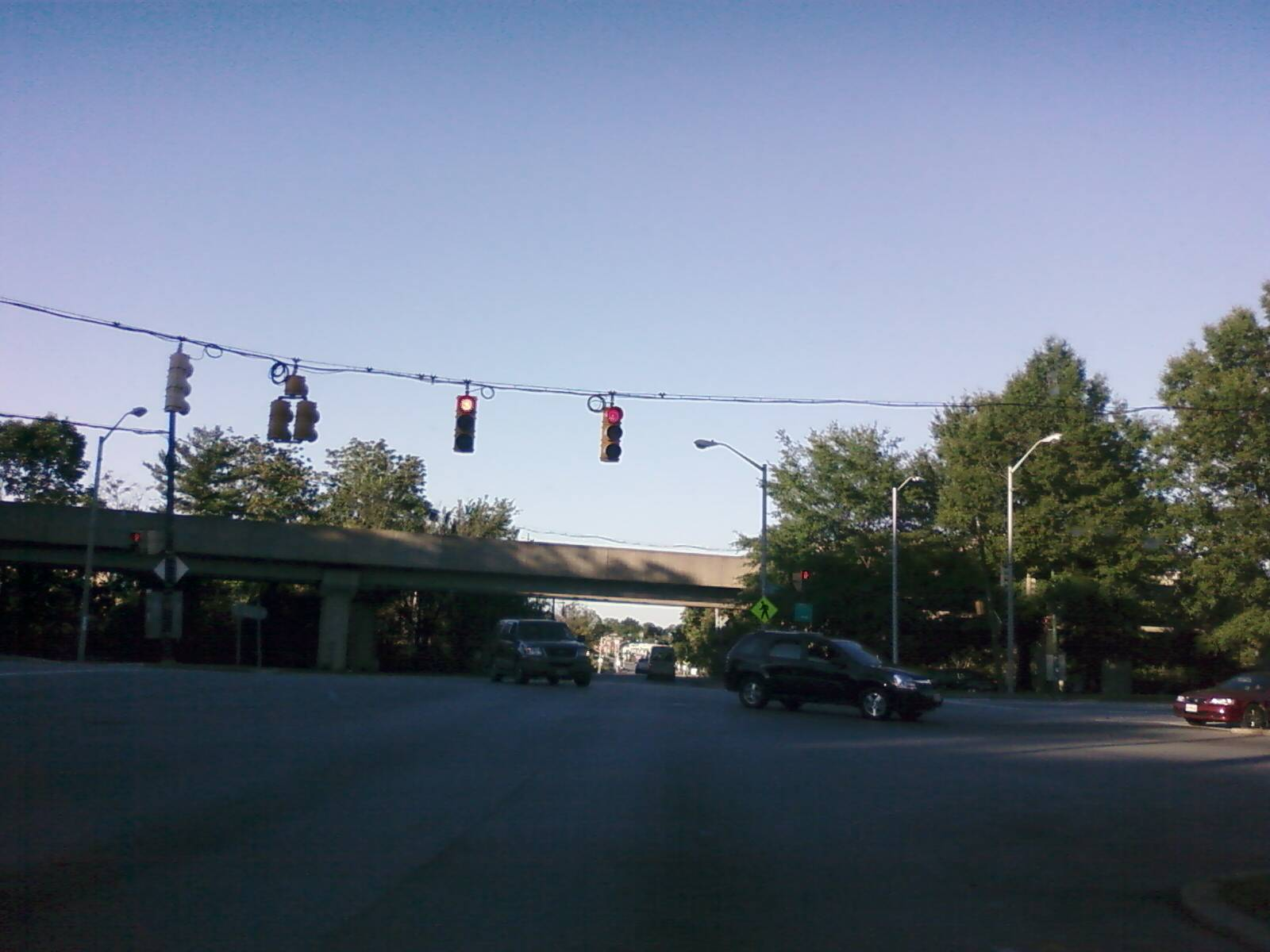
- Intersection of Patterson and Wabash Avenues (Baltimore Metro Subway is overhead)
- Owner: City of Baltimore
- Location: Baltimore
- Postal code: 21215
- North end: Ridge Avenue
- South end: Hilton Road

Wabash Avenue is a six-lane boulevard in northwest Baltimore, Maryland, that runs from Patterson Avenue to Hilton Street, mostly through the Arlington community, crossing over Northern Parkway and Cold Spring Lane along the way. The road starts near the Reisterstown Plaza Metro Subway Station and continues to just past the West Coldspring Metro Subway Station, where it narrows and becomes a one-way pair with Dorithan Road, which ends several blocks later at Hilton Street.

Wabash Avenue actually begins as a stub near the Reisterstown Road Plaza. The stub exists where a longer road was intended as part of the original plans of Interstate 795. This portion of I-795, which would have run through historic Sudbrook Park before reaching the city, was fought and ultimately cancelled as a result of complaints from Sudbrook Park residents. This led to the cancellation of all parts of I-795 within the city, and its truncation to I-695 (the Baltimore Beltway) near the suburb of Pikesville. Still, the road was constructed as a boulevard, and the Metro Subway was constructed along an overhead track directly parallel to the road. Three stations of the Metro system (Reisterstown Plaza, Rogers Avenue and West Coldspring) are located along Wabash Avenue.

A second street, which also carries the Wabash Avenue name, branches north off Liberty Heights Avenue near Mondawmin Mall before coming to a dead end at an apartment complex situated near the Metro tracks south of the West Coldspring Station; it does not connect to the other Wabash Avenue. South of Liberty Heights Avenue, the road continues as Dukeland Street.

A third street that carries the Wabash Avenue name is located in the suburb of Reisterstown, Maryland, and acts as a connector between Butler Road (MD 128) and Chatsworth Avenue, coming to a dead end beyond the latter road.

== Continuations ==
After Wabash Avenue ends, it leads to the following roads:

=== Hilton Street ===
Hilton Street is a mostly two-lane road that runs north-south for 3.8 miles (6.1 km) through West Baltimore, mostly through the neighborhood of Ashburton.

A 1 mile (1.6 km)-long portion of this road that runs through Leakin Park is known as Hilton Parkway. Hilton Parkway is a four-lane road from North Avenue to Edmondson Avenue, where there is an exit ramp. In 1990, a concrete barrier was installed in the median of Hilton Parkway due to a series of fatal accidents that had occurred.

=== Caton Avenue ===
Hilton Street, after passing Frederick Road/Frederick Avenue, becomes Caton Avenue, which continues in a north-south direction for 1.6 miles (2.6 km). Caton Avenue is exit 50 off Interstate 95.

The portion of Caton Avenue from Wilkens Avenue to Washington Boulevard is a part of Alternate US-1.

St. Agnes Hospital is located at the corner of Caton Avenue and Wilkens Avenue.

A separate section, known as West Caton Avenue, is a continuation of West Baltimore Street that runs northwest to Allendale Street, south of Edmondson Avenue.

=== Patapsco Avenue ===
Patapsco Avenue is a 5.2-mile (8.4 km), mostly six-lane road that runs from Washington Boulevard to a dead end in Fairfield shortly after Fairfield Road. The road has few landmarks and is mostly used for through traffic.

One of the stops of the Baltimore Light Rail known as the Patapsco Light Rail Stop is located on Patapsco Avenue. This location is also a hub for several Maryland Transit Administration bus lines.

== Major intersections ==
The entire route of Hilton Parkway is in Baltimore All exits are unnumbered.

mi	km	Destinations	Notes
0.00	0.00	North Hilton Street	At-grade intersections, southern terminus
0.29	0.47	Edmondson Avenue	Partial cloverleaf interchange
1.16	1.87	Winterbourne Road	Northbound exit only
1.36	2.19	West North Avenue – Downtown Bypass	At-grade intersections, northern terminus
1.000 mi = 1.609 km; 1.000 km = 0.621 mi: Incomplete access
