= West Cold Spring station =

Metro SubwayLink station

West Cold Spring
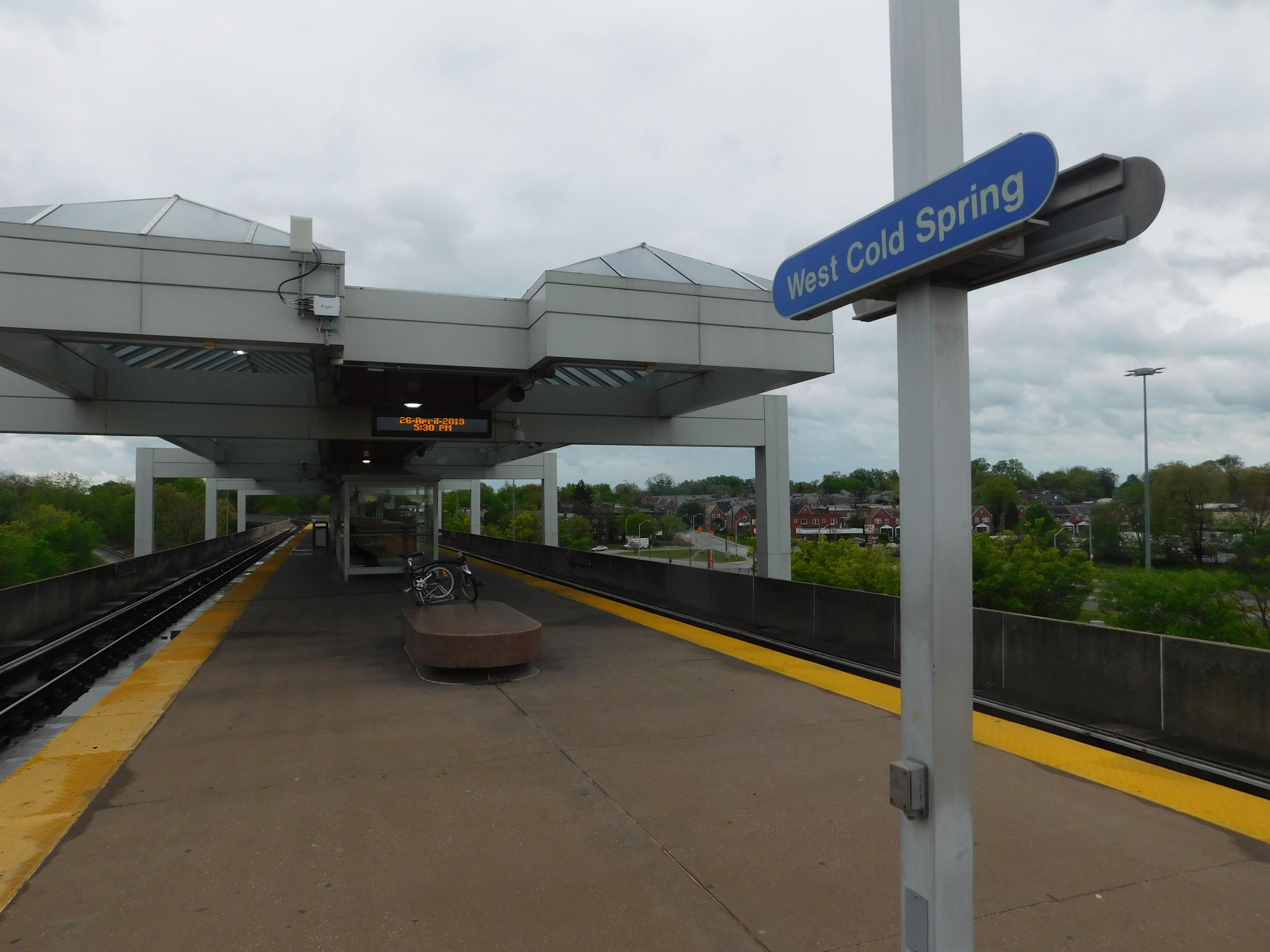
- West Cold Spring station in April 2019.

General information
- Location: 4301 Wabash Avenue; Baltimore, Maryland
- Coordinates: 39.336330°N 76.67250°W
- Owner: Maryland Transit Administration
- Platforms: 1 island platform
- Tracks: 2

Construction
- Parking: 300 spaces
- Accessible: Yes

History
- Opened: November 21, 1983

Passengers
- 2017: 1,364 daily

Services
Preceding station	Maryland Transit Administration	Following station
Rogers Avenue toward Owings Mills	Metro SubwayLink	Mondawmin toward Johns Hopkins Hospital
Location

West Cold Spring station is a Metro SubwayLink station in Baltimore, Maryland. It is located at the intersection of Wabash Avenue and Cold Spring Lane in the Arlington neighborhood, adjacent to the Towanda-Grantley neighborhood. It is the sixth most northern and western station on the line, with approximately 300 parking spaces.

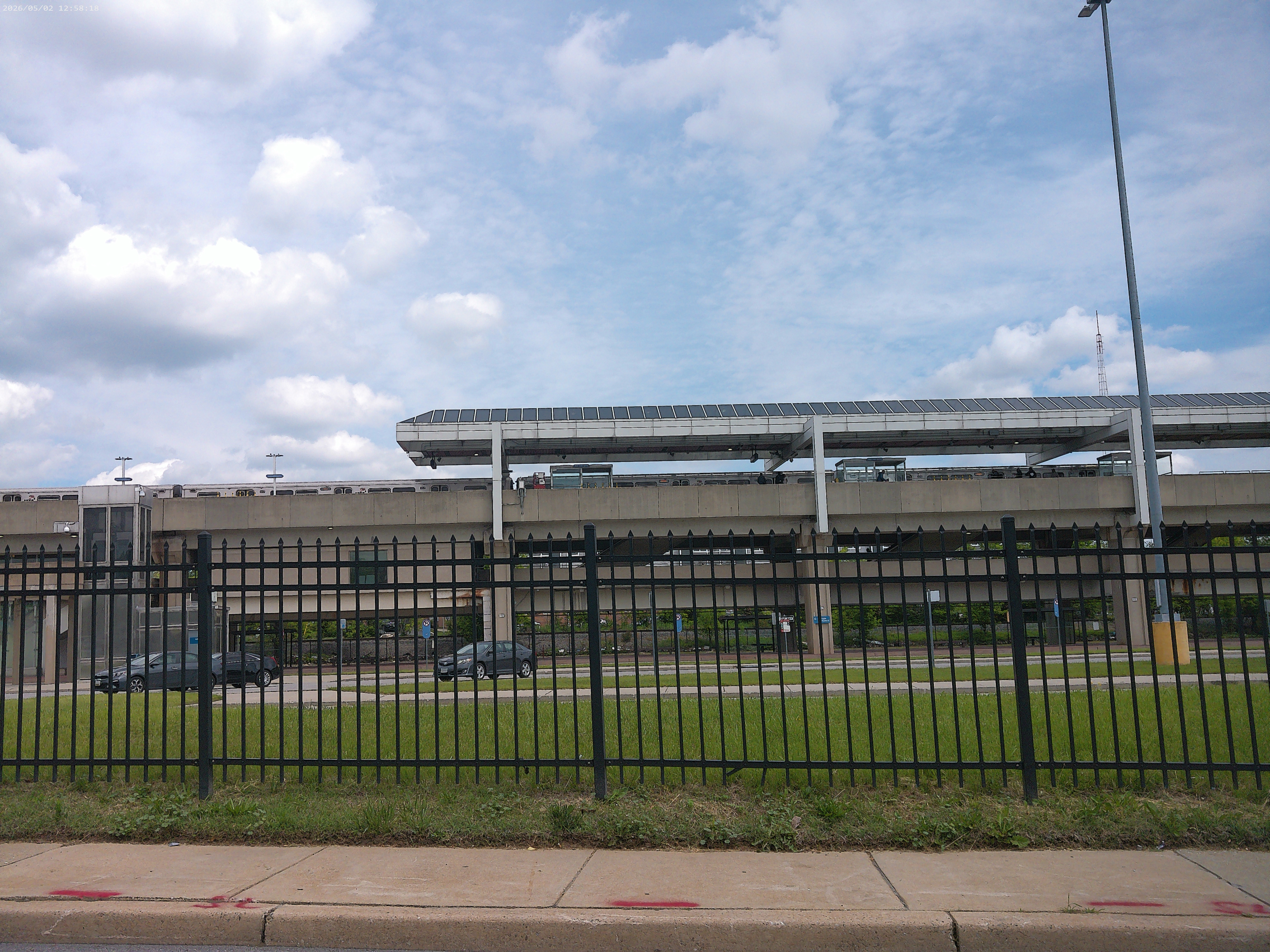
A view of the station on Wabash Avenue with a train bound for Owings Mills.

The station features the sculpture "Wabash Outcrop" by Jim Sanborn. In 2021, funding was allocated for a community driven public art project, Towanda LaneScape, adjacent to West Cold Spring station. The BaltimoreLink bus routes that connect to the station are the LocalLink 82 and the LocalLink 28.
