= Long Green Valley Historic District =

Historic district in Maryland, United States

- U.S. National Register of Historic Places
- U.S. Historic district
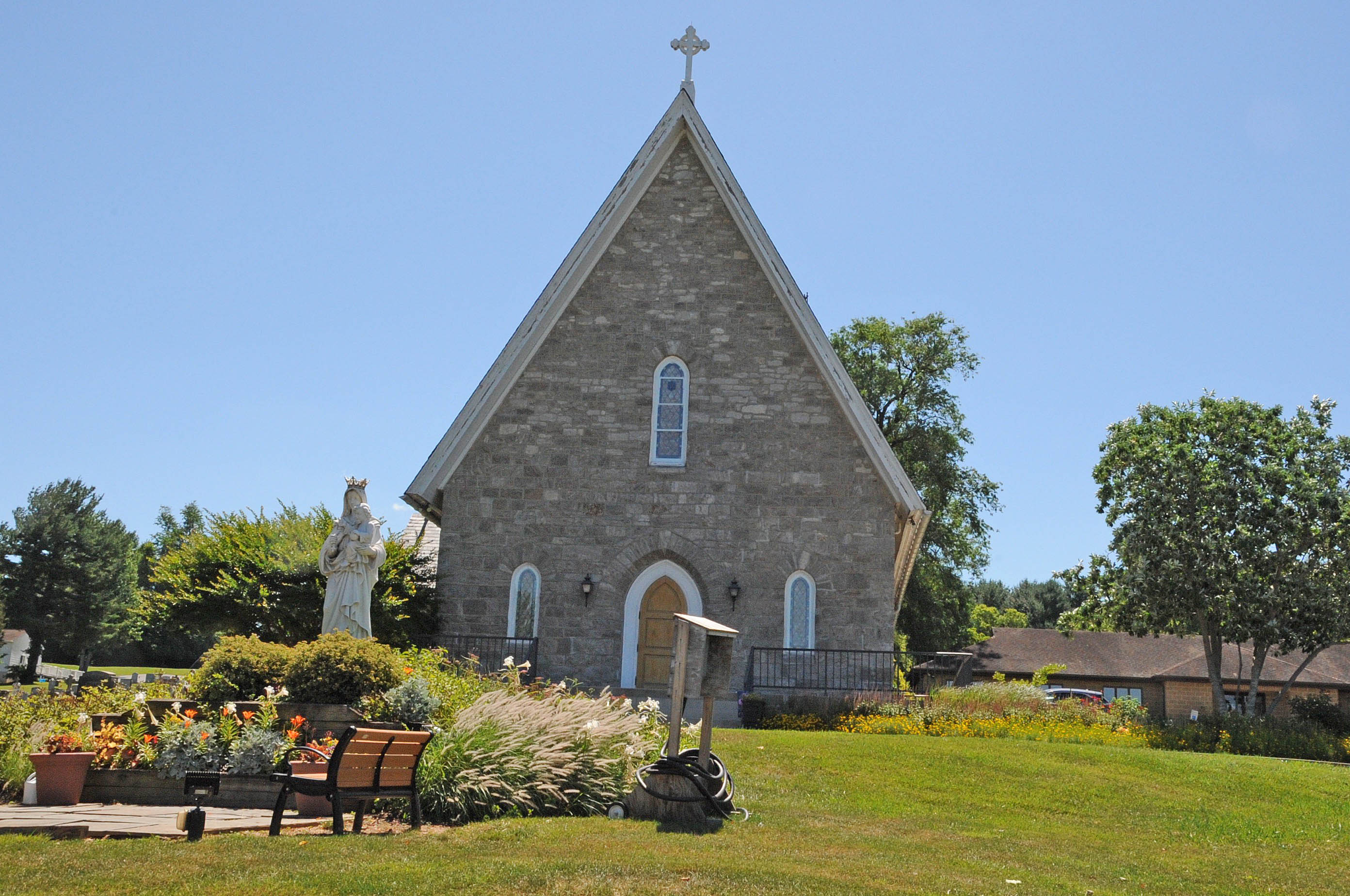
- St. John the Evangelist Catholic Church

- Location within Maryland Location within the United States
- Location: Glen Arm, Baldwin Mill, Manor, and Hartford Rds. areas, Baldwin, Maryland
- Coordinates: 39°28′35″N 76°29′23″W
- Area: 6,066 acres (2,455 ha)
- Architectural style: Greek Revival, Gothic, Colonial Revival
- NRHP reference No.: 82001589
- Added to NRHP: December 30, 1982

Long Green Valley Historic District is a national historic district in Baltimore County, Maryland, United States. It is an approximately 6,066-acre (24.55 km^{2}) rural agricultural area to the northeast of the city of Baltimore. The valley has a distinct physical unity created by gently rolling fields dotted with crossroads villages such as Glen Arm, Baldwin, and Hydes and farm complexes. Its architecture covers the 18th, 19th, and early 20th centuries and reflect major architectural styles popular in the United States from the Neoclassical of the 18th century to the Georgian Revival of the pre 1935 period. It was added to the National Register of Historic Places in 1982.

Geographically the valley is central to Boordy Vineyards, established in 1945, it is the first vineyard native to Maryland. The property of the vineyard was previously part of Gittings Choice (Long Green Farm), the home of the Gittings family established in 1720; the Gittings became one of the wealthiest and most prominent families in Baltimore during the 19th and early 20th century. The Gittings named the valley Long Green, and there are four villages in England with this name, suggesting the Gittings may have come from one of those villages.

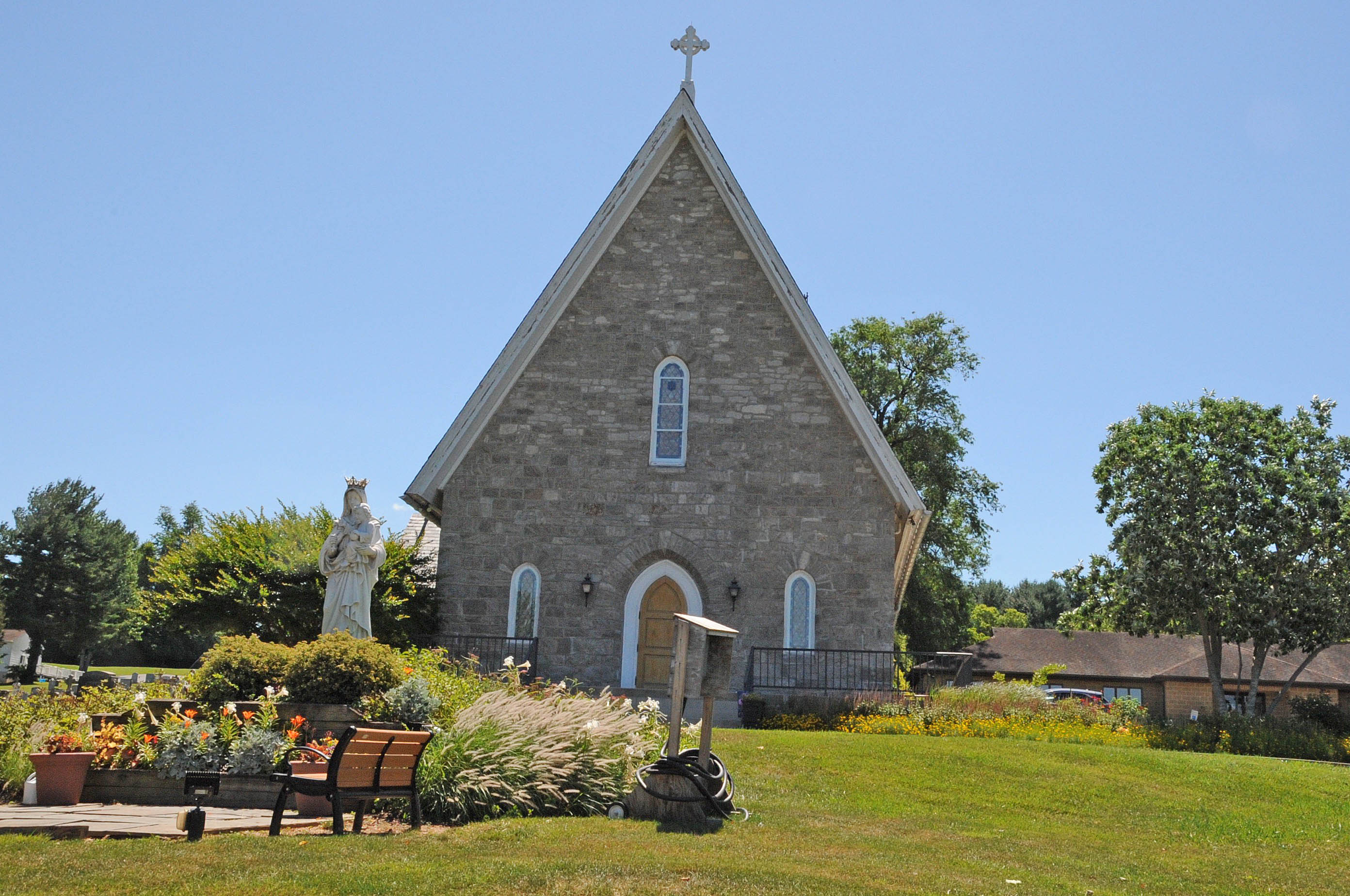
