= Baltimore City District Courthouses =

District courthouses in Baltimore

The Baltimore City District Courthouses of the District Court of Maryland are located at North Avenue, Wabash Avenue, Patapsco Avenue and N. Calvert Street in Baltimore, Maryland, and serve as the courts of first impression for the majority of residents in Baltimore City. (See https://www.courts.state.md.us/district/directories/baltimorecityFAYETTE for closure of E Fayette Street courthouse.)

The courthouse has been relocated to 500 North Calvert Street

The jurisdiction of the District Court includes most landlord–tenant cases, small claims (amounts up to $5,000), replevin actions, motor vehicle violations, misdemeanors, some felonies, and peace and protective orders.

== Eastside District Court ==
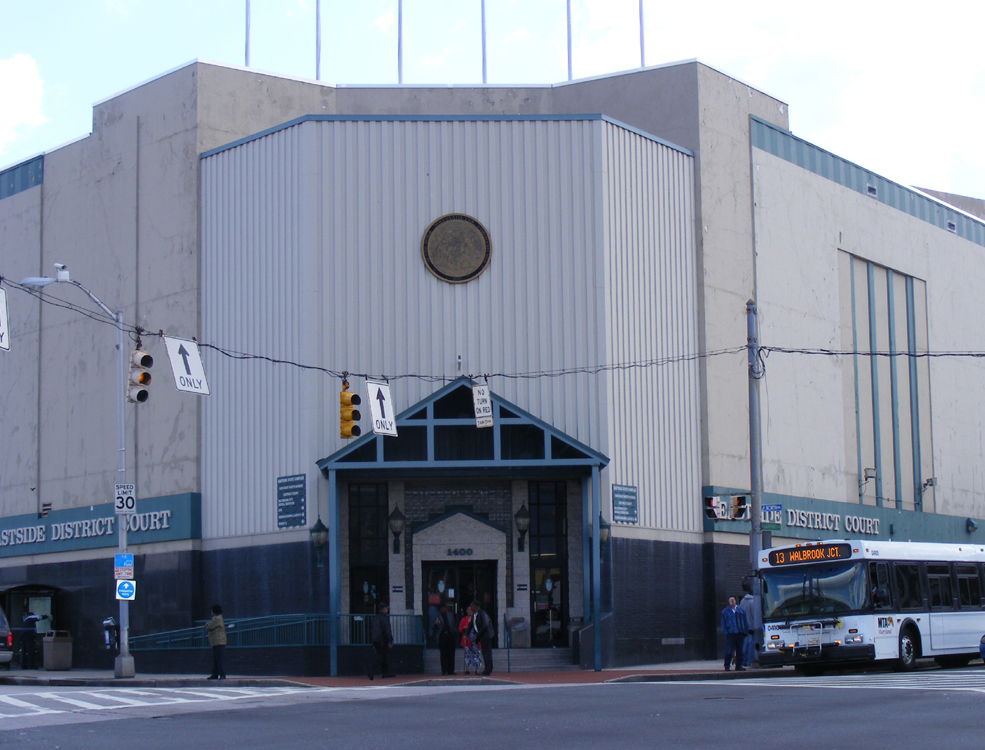
District Courthouse on North Avenue

39°18′44.65″N 76°35′55.31″W

The Eastside District Court Building, also known as North Avenue, is located at 1400 E. North Avenue in the North-Eastern area of Baltimore at the intersection of North Avenue and Harford Road. The property is owned by J4P ASSOCIATES.

=== History ===
The building was formerly a Sears store and was converted into a courthouse after the store closed in September 1981. The building, which stood at five stories height, was constructed in 1938 out of molded concrete on the site of the former Samuel Ready School. It was painted grey with black granite trim, with its windows and doors highlighted by molded bronze. The corner of the building at the intersection of North Avenue and Harford Road was flat and featured an enormous, three-story-high display window. It was claimed that this window was the largest of its kind in the world at the time at 40 feet (12 m) high, forty feet across and 27 feet (8.2 m) deep. The window would later be smashed in April 1968 during the riots that took place following the assassination of Dr. Martin Luther King Jr. Other than the entrances, the only other source of natural light in the building came from several panels of glass brick that ran the full height of the third and fourth floors directly above the entrances.

The store itself opened on September 21, 1938, with an opening ceremony that was attended by both the Governor of Maryland and the Mayor of Baltimore. It closed 43 years later due to what management called "efficiency of operation". In the building's current function as a courthouse the display window and Sears signs are gone, but the rest of the exterior has remained unaltered.

== Wabash District Court ==
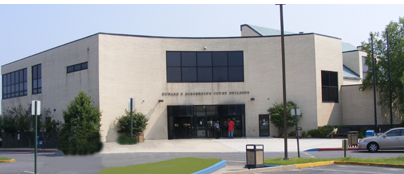
Edward F. Borgerding District Court Building

39°20′56.28″N 76°42′7.8″W

The Edward F. Borgerding District Court Building, aka Wabash, is located at 5800 Wabash Avenue in the northwest section of Baltimore City. Construction started in 1985 and on February 5, 1986 it was officially dedicated with remarks from then Baltimore Mayor William Donald Schaefer, then Governor Harry Hughes and the chief judge of the Maryland Court of Appeals, Robert C. Murphy. The building uses its 52,824 square feet (4,907.5 m^{2}) to house seven courtrooms, judges chambers, clerks' offices and satellite offices for the public defender and the state's attorney for Baltimore City. Graduations from the city's district drug courts are also held at this location.

== Patapsco District Court ==
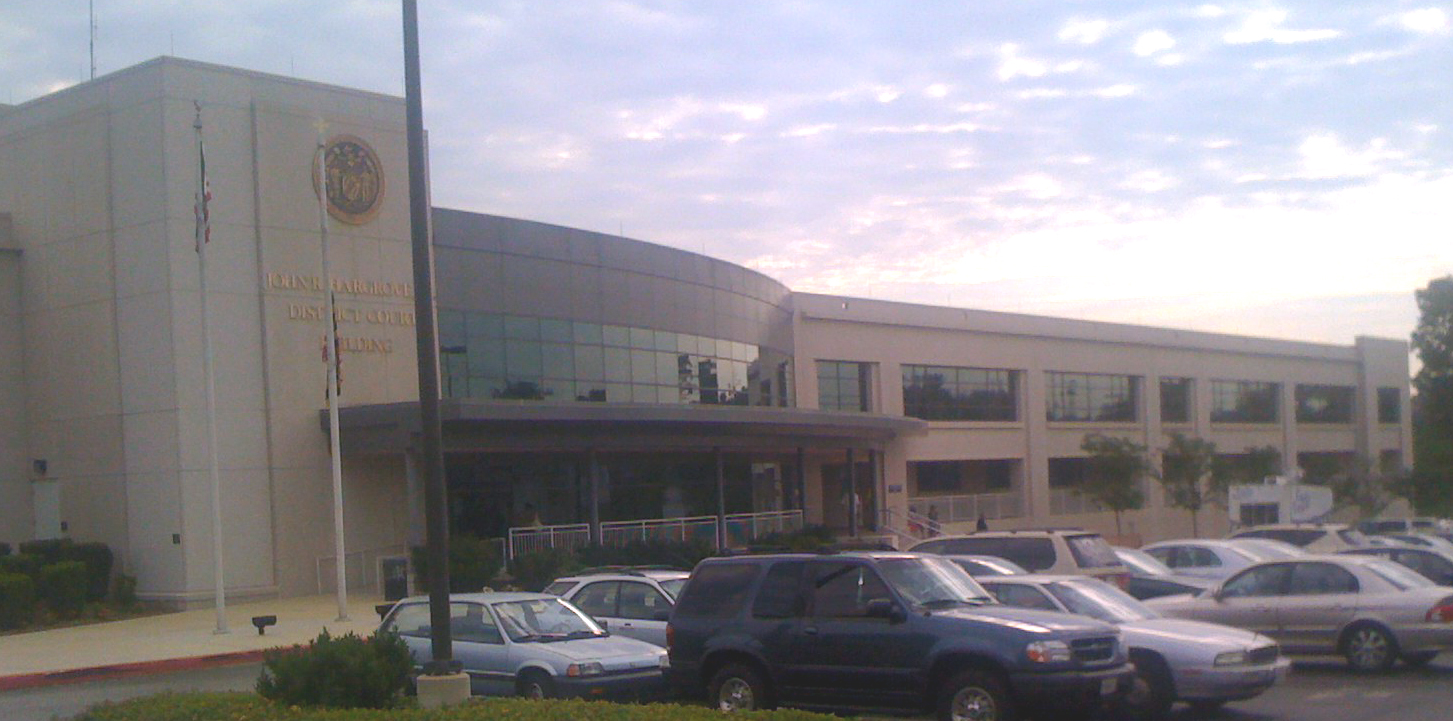
John R. Hargrove, Sr. District Court Building

39°14′9.75″N 76°35′56.85″W

The newest of the Baltimore City District Courthouses is the John R. Hargrove, Sr. Building, located at 700 E. Patapsco Avenue in southern Baltimore City. The 87,203-square-foot (8,101.4 m^{2}), two-story building was built on a 6.5-acre (26,000 m^{2}) parcel of land at Patapsco Avenue and 7th Street. In addition to six courtrooms, the building includes offices for the District One court operations, State's Attorney and Public Defender offices and parking for 262 cars. The general contractor for the $11.9 million facility was Roy Kirby and Sons, Inc., of Baltimore. The architect for the project was RCG/HOK, a joint venture (RCG of Baltimore and HOK of Washington, D.C.).

=== History ===
Ground for this new courthouse was broken in 2001 and it is named in honor of the late Judge John R. Hargrove, Sr., the first African-American to serve as an administrative judge of any court in Maryland. In 1974, Judge Hargrove was appointed to the Supreme Bench of Baltimore City, now the Circuit Court, where he served for ten years until his appointment by President Ronald Reagan to the federal bench in 1983. Judge Hargrove died April 1, 1997.

== Civil Division ==
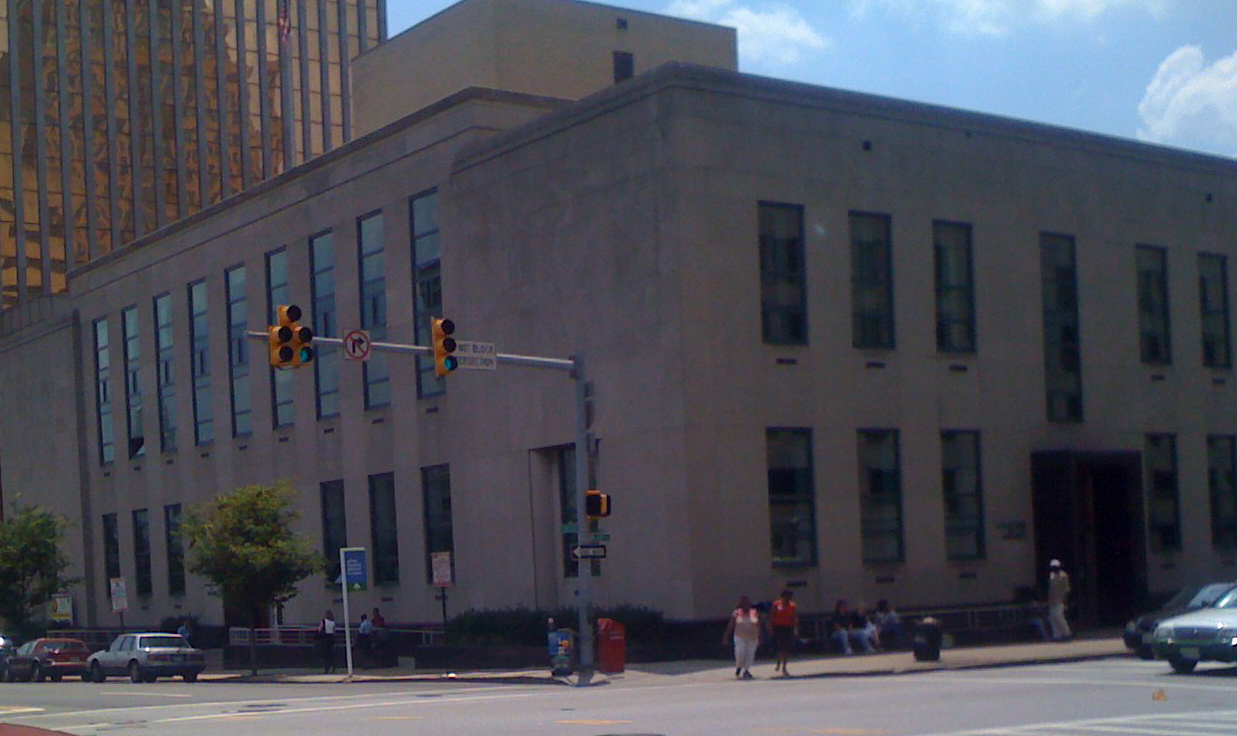
Baltimore's Civil District Court at Fayette and Gay Streets

39°17′26.28″N 76°36′32.31″W

The Civil Division of the District Court of Maryland for Baltimore City is located at the intersection of Fayette and Gay Streets in Baltimore City. All minor civil matters including landlord tenant disputes, housing violations and minor civil suits are handled here.

A parking garage, where portions of the movie …and Justice for All were filmed, once stood next to the court building. The garage was torn down to make way for the Baltimore City Police headquarters.

== Central Booking ==
39°17′54.98″N 76°36′35.94″W

The Baltimore City Central Booking Intake Center, also known as Central Booking, which is located at 300 E. Madison Street in the east-central part of Baltimore City, also houses a courtroom for the District of Maryland for Baltimore City. The facility is largely a correctional intake facility run by the state of Maryland. Judges assigned here usually hold hearings involving persons recently arrested for crimes and who are being held, pre-trial, in lieu of a certain dollar amount bail. Bail review hearings are held daily with members of the Baltimore City State's Attorney's office and the Office of the Public Defender present.
