= Towanda-Grantley, Baltimore =

Neighborhood in Baltimore

Towanda-Grantley
- Neighborhood of Baltimore
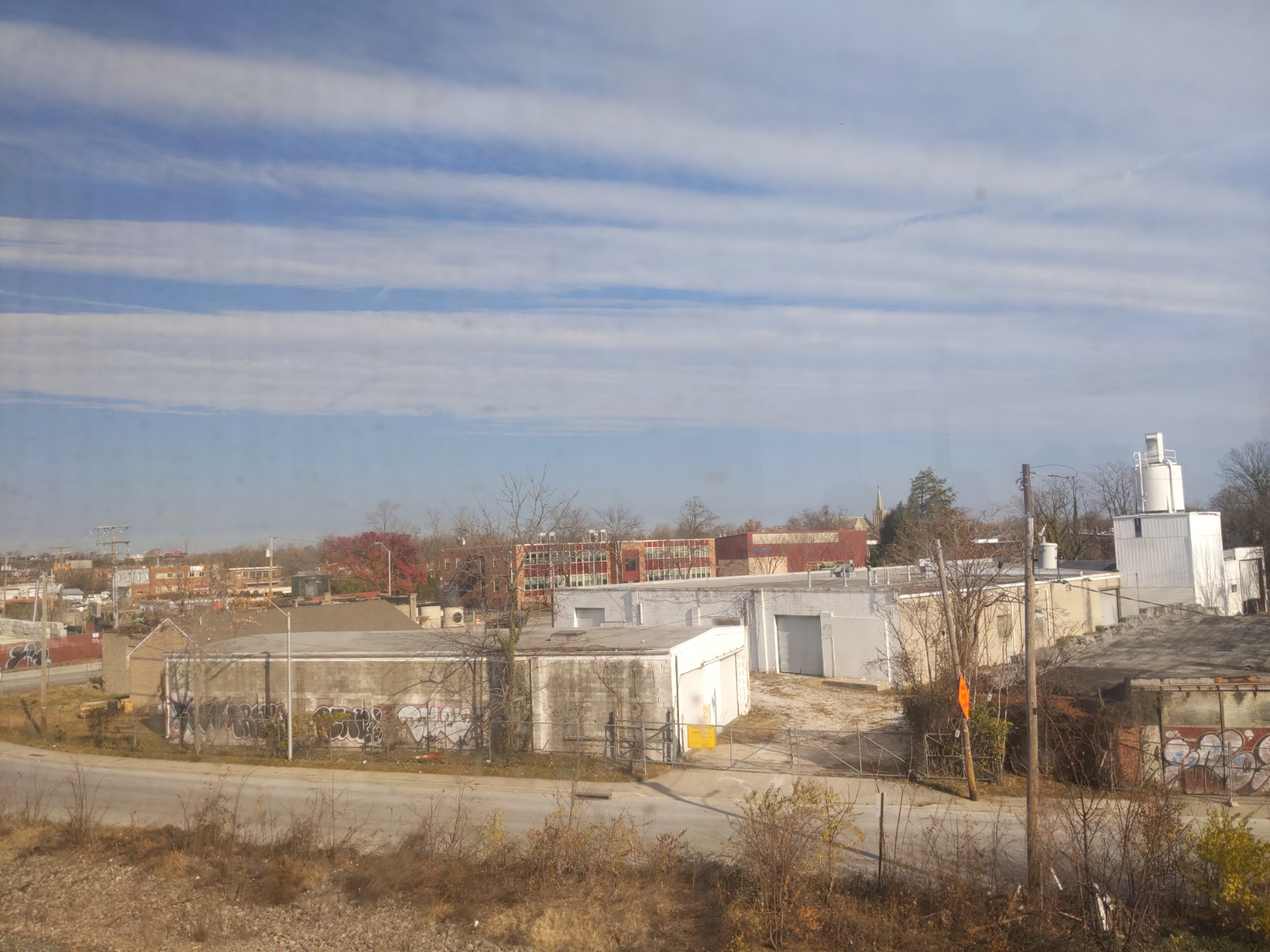
- Buildings at the intersection of E. Wabash Avenue and W. Cold Spring Lane in Towanda-Grantley, Baltimore

- Location within Baltimore Location within Maryland Location within the United States
- Coordinates: 39.338°N 76.669°W
- Country: United States
- State: Maryland
- City: Baltimore
- Time zone: UTC−5 (Eastern)
  - Summer (DST): UTC−4 (EDT)
- ZIP Codes: 21215
- Area Codes: 410, 443, 667

Towanda-Grantley is a neighborhood in northwest Baltimore which predominantly consists of attached residential properties which were built in the 1950s. The neighborhood is often described as part of the greater Park Heights area, and includes the West Cold Spring Metro Subway station at its northwestern edge at the intersection of West Cold Spring Lane and Wabash Avenue.
