= Gittings family =

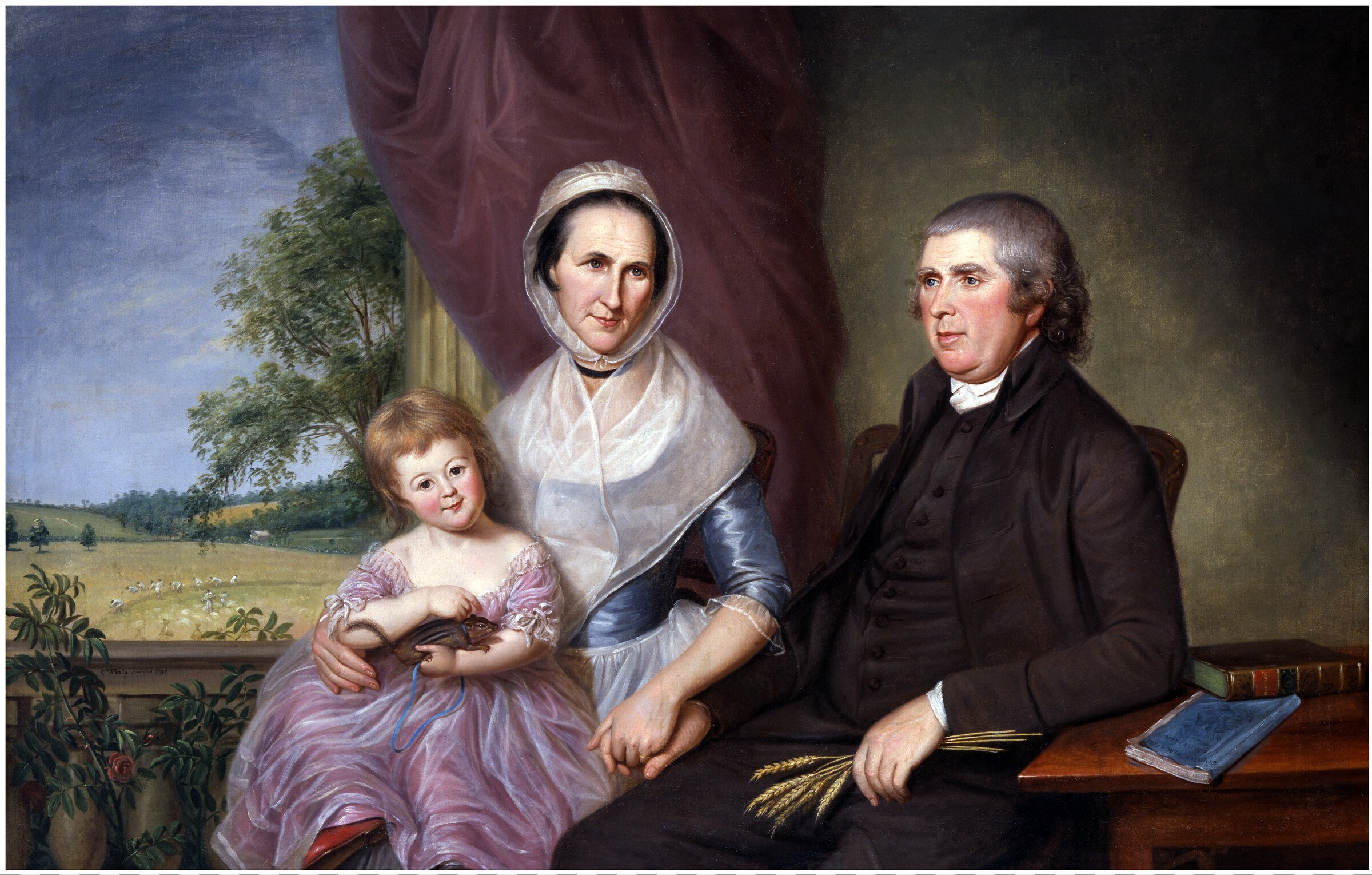
Group portrait in 1791 of Colonel James Gittings (1730 or 1735–1823), Elizabeth Buchanan Gittings (1742–1818), their granddaughter Louise (1789–1841), and Gittings slaves working a wheat field. At Gittings Choice. By Charles Willson Peale (1741–1827).

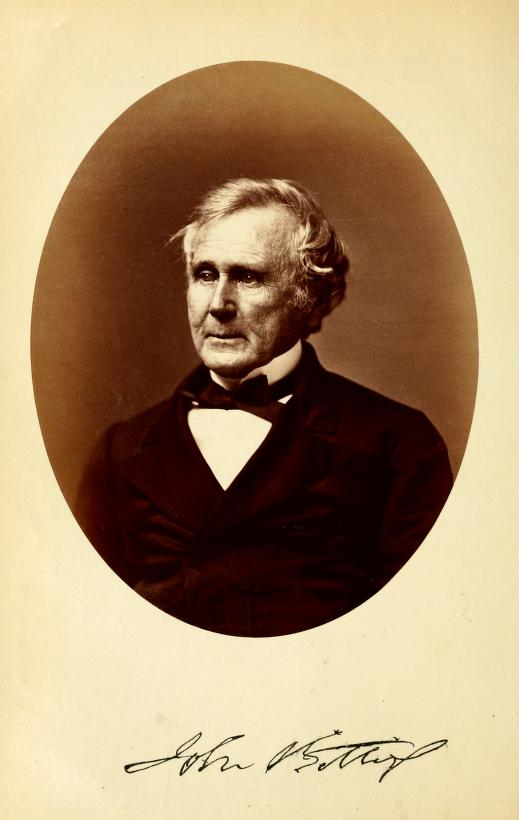
Photograph and signature of John Sterett Gittings (1798–1879).

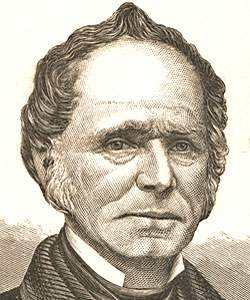
Pen and ink portrait of David Sterett Gittings.

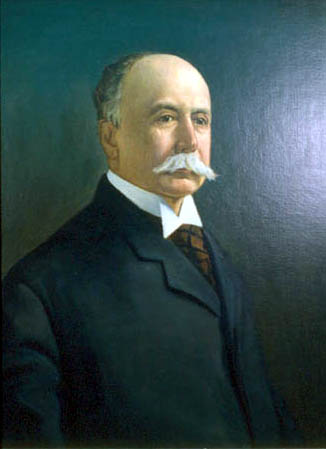
John Sterett Gittings (1848–1926). Oil and canvas.

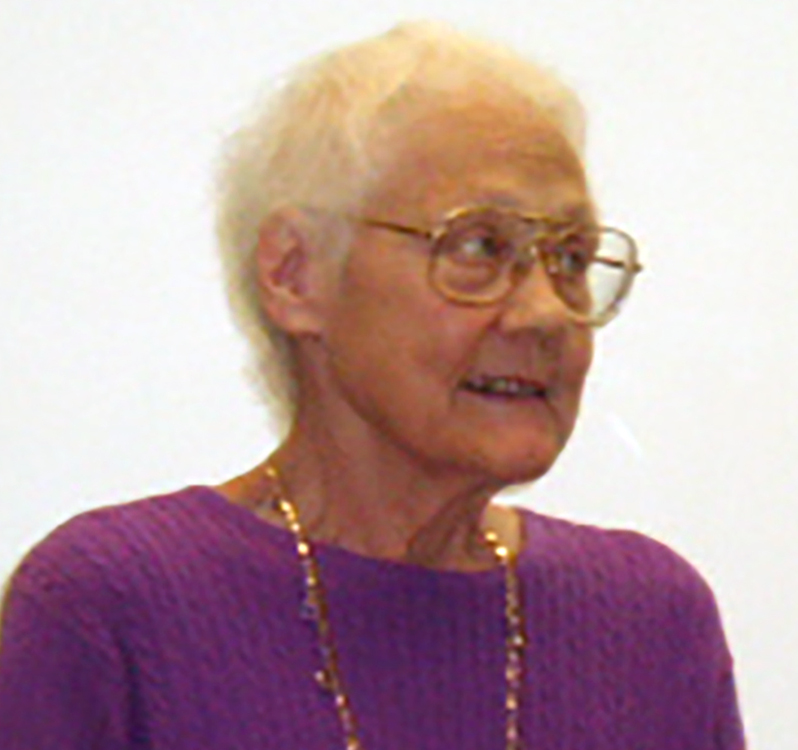
Barbara Gittings (1932-2007)

The Gittings family were once wealthy, powerful and prominent in Baltimore, Maryland from the late 18th to early 20th centuries. At one time in the late 19th century they were described as the largest real estate holders in the city, and the largest single taxpayer in the city. The Gittings, known as devout Christians and politically conservative bankers, were also elected politicians, heads of railroads, foreign diplomats, city commissioners, and in one case, an important gay rights activist. They were plantation slave owners during the first few generations, and John Sterett Gittings (1798–1879) was a southern cause sympathizer during the civil war. One of their farms in Baltimore City became the neighborhood of Ashburton, today the home of many prominent black professionals and politicians.

== Early history ==
The Gittings family probably originated from England.

A certain John Gittings (ca. 1641–1675 or 1676), probably born in Godstone, Surrey, England, was court clerk of Calvert County and St. Mary's County. He was transported to the colonies in 1658 by Phillip Calvert, governor of Maryland, to serve as a court clerk. In 1661, he became the first person in Maryland to be appointed as dedicated court clerk to the Upper House of the Maryland General Assembly (the central governing body of Maryland), and served in various clerking duties for years after. He owned a farm called Causein consisting of fifty acres, with houses, edifices, gardens and orchard, near St. Mary's City, St. Mary's County, Maryland. Gittings was the first person in Maryland known to refer to their plantation as a "farme" (farm), an important nomenclature that later historians would study because the north and south colonies had different kinds of practices for farms/plantations.

The settler Thomas Gittings (ca. 1682–1760), probably from Kent County, Maryland, possibly related to the court clerk John Gittings, arrived in Baltimore County sometime before April 1721. On this date, Thomas signed a lease with Lord Baltimore to establish a 450 acre farm called Gittins Choice, in Long Green Valley, northeast of the future site of Baltimore. Over the next 30 years he acquired another 820 acres in Long Green Valley, and 7 slaves. He had seven children, one of whom James Gittings (1730 or 1735–1823) inherited Gittins Choice.

== Notable members ==
=== James Gittings, Sr. (1730 or 1735–1823) ===
Born April 23, 1730, or 1735 to Thomas Gittings at Gittins Choice. A farmer and real estate speculator, he signed the 1775 Declaration of the Association of the Freemen of Maryland at the Annapolis Convention (Assembly of Freeman), which functioned as a provisional government in the early days leading up to the Revolutionary War. With the commencement of hostilities, in May 1776, he was Captain of the Gunpowder Upper Hundred of Baltimore County Militia, and by August 1777 had risen to the rank of Lieutenant Colonel, thereafter known as the "Colonel". In 1789, James was a member of the Maryland General Assembly. He was one of four Baltimore County opponents to the Convention to Ratify the Federal Constitution, April 21–29, 1788. He married the daughter of George Buchanan (1696–1750), one of the founders of Baltimore City, and owner of Druid Hill. By 1800 he has acquired over 2,000 acres and 50 slaves, making him the largest slaveholder in the Long Green Valley. He also owned property in Baltimore Town including in the Fells Point area. He died February 22, 1823, age 92, with 31 slaves, and 400 acres the remainder land previously given to his sons. He had two sons, Richard Johnston Gittings (1763–1830) and James Gittings, Jr. (1770–1820). The two brothers married two sisters, Mary Sterett (1772–1847) and Harriet Sterett (1775–1822) respectively, the daughters of John Sterett.

=== David Sterett Gittings (1797–1887) ===
David Sterett Gittings, born August 17, 1797, was the son of Richard Johnston Gittings (1763–1830) and Mary Sterett (1772–1847). Richard attended Dickinson College, and became one of the most accomplished physicians in Baltimore County, Maryland. His papers, along with those of his father, are held at the Maryland Historical Society and they feature an important record of the births and deaths of the family's slaves between 1817 and 1859.

=== John Sterett Gittings (1798–1879) ===
John Sterett Gittings, born May 27, 1798, was the son of James Gittings, Jr. (1769–1820) and Harriet Sterett (1775–1822). He attended Dickinson College, and studied banking in the counting house of James A. Buchanan. He founded John S. Gittings & Son, 1832 (a banking house). Was President of Chesapeake Bank for over 40 years, 1835–1879. President of Northern Central Railroad. Offices held included Commissioner of the Loans for the State of Maryland, 1836–1839; Member, City Council of Baltimore; a Director of Baltimore and Ohio Railroad, 1841; Commissioner of Public Works. He was described as disciplined, fixed, severe, prompt and methodical. During the Civil War his sympathies were with the south. In 1861 during the chaotic events of the Baltimore Plot to assassinate Abraham Lincoln, Gittings helped to spirit Lincoln's wife and children to safety inside his house, protecting them from an angry street mob outside. Gittings encountered Lincoln again in 1864, in a dramatic late night appeal Gittings requested a stay of the execution of three Confederate spies scheduled to be hanged the next morning in Baltimore. Lincoln agreed to reverse the execution order as thanks for his family's safe harbor during the Baltimore Plot. At the time of his death he was one of the richest men in the city, tax records showed he was the largest individual tax payer in Baltimore. He was very religious and founded his own church. Much of his wealth was in real estate including the St. James Hotel and other valuable properties throughout the city. He died December 8, 1879, at his residence, 149 St. Paul St., Baltimore, and is buried at Green Mount Cemetery. He had two children, Eleanor Addison, and William Sterett Gittings. He owned the family farm estate known as Ashburton in West Baltimore, that eventually became the neighborhood of Ashburton, Baltimore. He built many of the row houses in Riverside Historic District; Gittings Street there is named for him.

=== John Sterett Gittings (1848–1926) ===
John Sterett Gittings was the son of William S. Gittings, and grandson of John Sterett Gittings (1798–1879). He worked with his grandfather at the banking firm of John S. Gittings & Son, for over forty years from 1870 to 1912, including as head of the bank from 1880. It was the second oldest bank in the south. He was paymaster general of the State militia during the terms of two governors, an office he held until 1870. In 1882 Gittings was elected to the Maryland House of Delegates from Baltimore County, and served as chairman of the House Ways and Means Committee. He was appointed State Treasurer of Maryland from 1885 to 1886, and there served as a member of the State Board of Public Works. He died January 23, 1926, of pneumonia at his home in the Burford Apartments, 3209 North Charles Street, Baltimore. He is buried at Green Mount Cemetery. He sold the Ashburton family farm estate to developers becoming the neighborhood of Ashburton, Baltimore.

=== John Sterett Gittings, Jr. (1888–1961) ===
Born January 16, 1888, in Baltimore, son of John Sterett Gittings (1848–1926). Attended Harvard University graduating in 1910. Worked as a U. S. Diplomat attached to the United States Foreign Service in Riga, Latvia; and Vienna, Austria, among other places. Died June 17, 1961, in Wilmington, DE.

=== Barbara Gittings ===
Barbara Gittings (July 31, 1932 – February 18, 2007) was an activist for LGBT equality. She was born to Elizabeth (née Brooks) Gittings and John Sterett Gittings, Jr. in Vienna, Austria, where her father was serving as a U.S. diplomat.
