= Rogers Avenue station =

Metro SubwayLink station in Baltimore, Maryland, US

Rogers Avenue
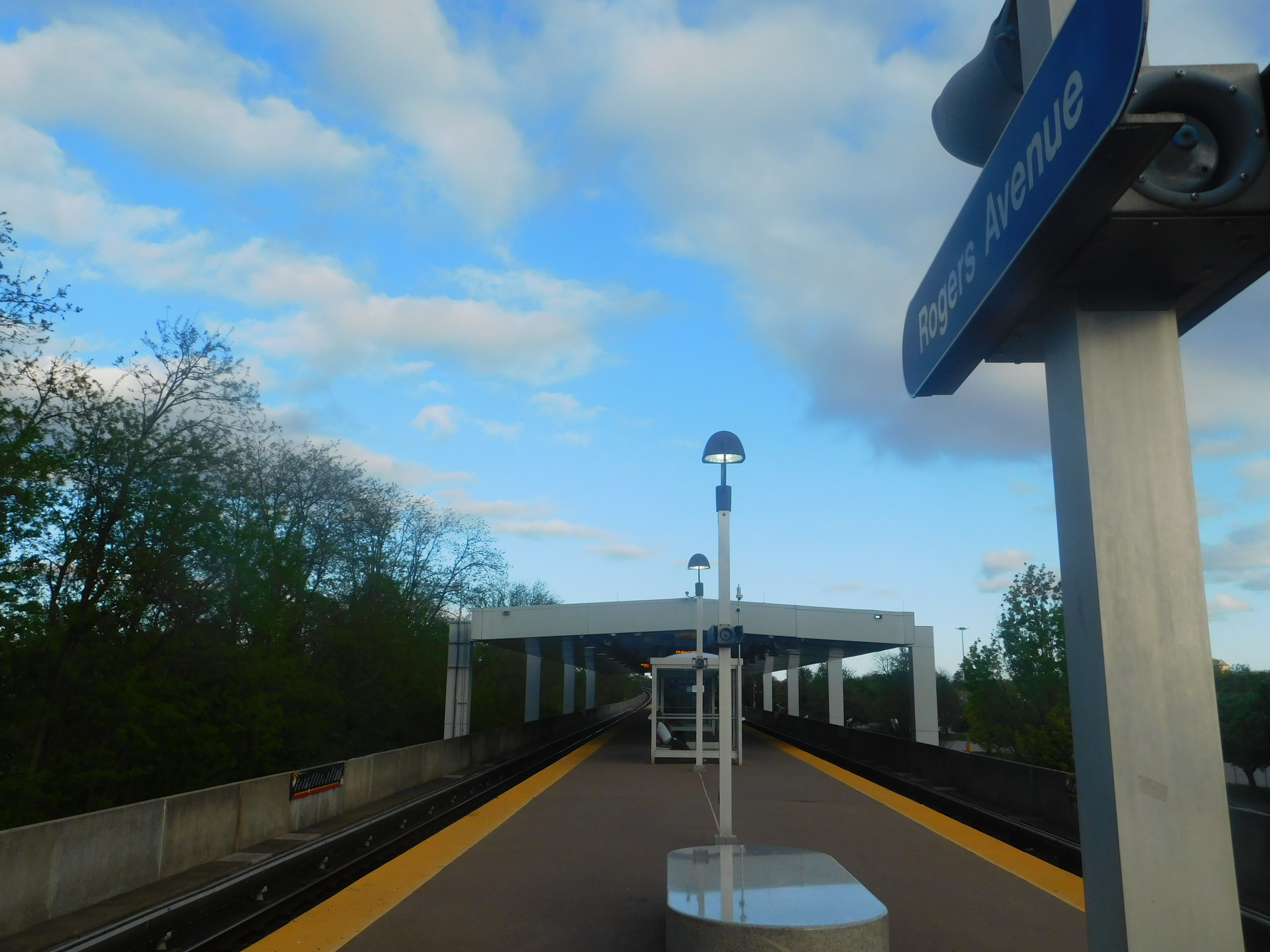
- Rogers Avenue station in April 2019

General information
- Location: 4300 Hayward Avenue; Baltimore, Maryland 21215
- Coordinates: 39°20′41.3″N 76°41′30.7″W
- Owner: Maryland Transit Administration
- Platforms: 1 island platform
- Tracks: 2

Construction
- Parking: 900 spaces
- Accessible: Yes

History
- Opened: November 21, 1983

Passengers
- 2017: 2,118 daily

Services
Preceding station	Maryland Transit Administration	Following station
Reisterstown Plaza toward Owings Mills	Metro SubwayLink	West Cold Spring toward Johns Hopkins Hospital
Location

Rogers Avenue station is a Metro SubwayLink station in Baltimore, Maryland. It is located in the Woodmere area, and is the fifth most northern and western station on the line, with approximately 900 parking spaces.

== Station features ==
The station has been included in the MTA's 2021 digital signage pilot.

== Artwork ==
The station features a sculpture entitled "Weathering Steel" by Greg Moring.

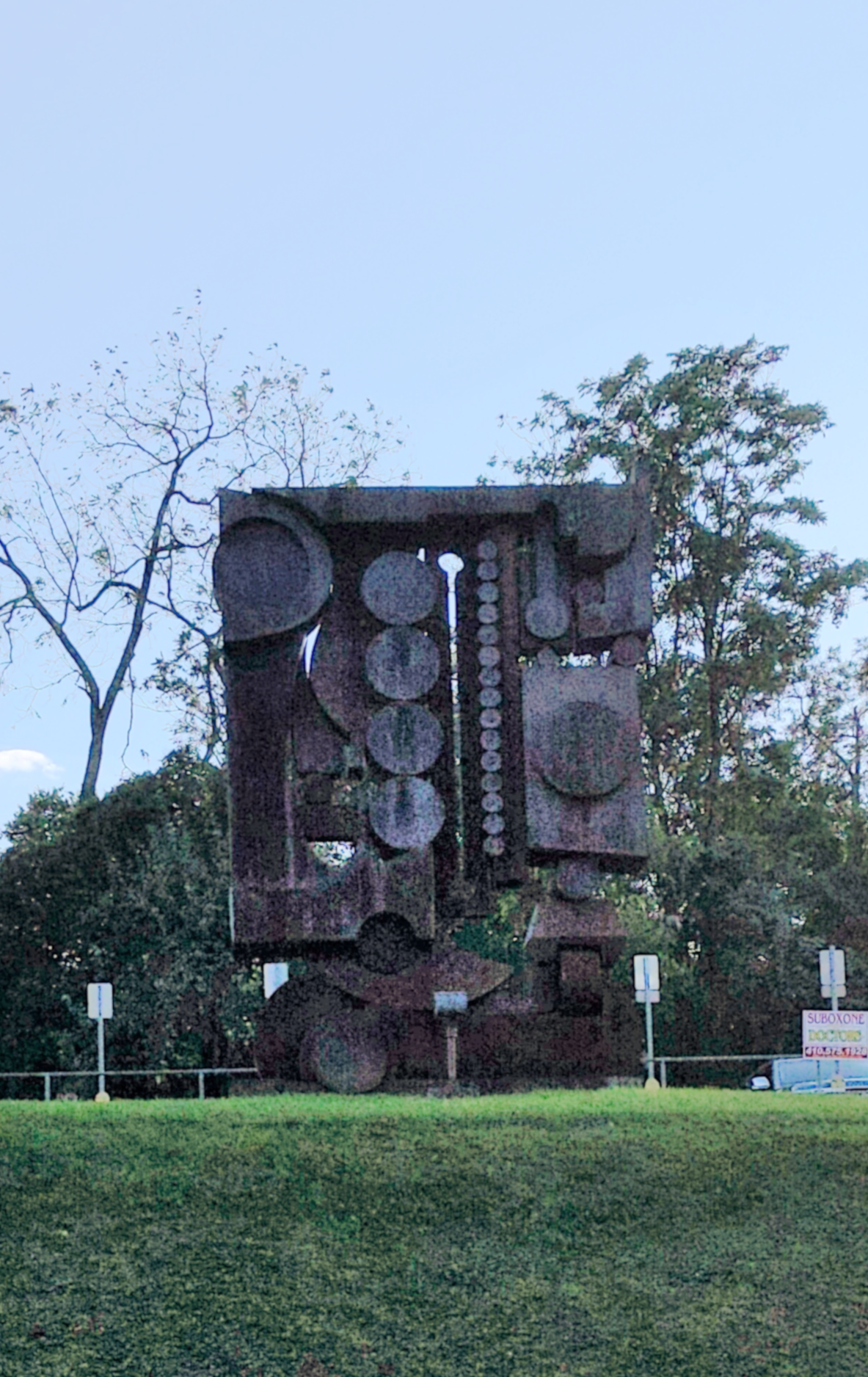
Weathering Steel by Greg Moring

== Nearby attractions ==
- Baltimore City District Court
- Hilltop Shopping Center
- Jewish Community Center of Greater Baltimore
- MTA Offices
- Northwest Plaza
- Pimlico Race Course
