= Samuel Ready School =

Former school in Maryland, USA

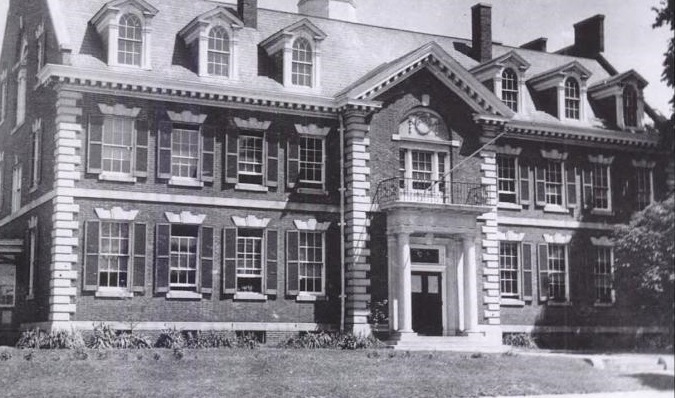
- Samuel Ready School in 1887.

Location
- Baltimore Maryland; United States
- 39.293813°N 76.711009°W

Information
- School type: Private
- Motto: French: Toujours Prêt (Always Ready)
- Established: 1 November 1887
- Founder: Samuel Ready
- Status: School closed and organization converted to scholarship
- Closed: June 1977
- Gender: Female
- Campus type: Suburban
- Website: http://www.samuelready.org

The Samuel Ready Asylum for Female Orphans, later shortened to Samuel Ready School, was a girls' boarding school in Baltimore. It was founded in 1887, based on a plan by Samuel Ready (1789–1871), to serve orphan girls from age 6 to 15. From 1977 it admitted other girls of academic ability from poorer homes. The school closed in 1977.

== History ==
The Samuel Ready Asylum for Female Orphans opened on November 1, 1887. From 1887 to 1936 the school was located on North Avenue and Harford Road. The head of the school board thought it would be a great time to expand the school. Thus, in 1937 the school was relocated to Baltimore National Pike Way. But due to a gradual decline of student enrollment the school closed in 1977. The board of trustees decided to use the funds that were being granted through Samuel Ready and other beneficiaries to start a scholarship organization in order to continue helping young women.

=== School community. ===
In November 1887 twelve orphan girls traveled to Baltimore to become the first scholars of the Samuel Ready Asylum for Female Orphans. Their ages ranged from 6 to 15. These young girls came from different districts within Maryland and some of them came from another country. Out of the 12 females, five were born in Baltimore, three were from Chile, and the remaining four were from Mt. Airy and or Annapolis.

Helen J. Rowe was the very first principal of the school. She demarcated the school as being a very efficient combination of a school and a home. Rowe was a big influence in merging cultural interests together among the students and guiding the ladies to proficient careers. Rowe was the principal of the school from its establishment (1887) until her death in 1919. From 1921 to 1949, Mary E. Krekel functioned as the superintendent of the school. Krekel was a Samuel Ready Alumni. She entered the school when she was 8 years old and graduated 11 years later with a teaching certificate from Peabody Conservatory of Music. After a year of privately teaching music she decided to return to the Samuel Ready School to be a music teacher and from there she was promoted and became the superintendent.

During her time there she did much to help the young ladies and many others that were starting to enroll. From the substantial growth the school was having Krekel thought it would be a good time to expand the school. This resulted in the school relocating from North Avenue to Baltimore National Pike way. "The Consequent supervisors were Evangeline Lewis (1949–1963), Constance P. Walter (1963–1974), and Jackson E. Heffner (1974–1977)".

=== Structure ===
The Samuel Ready School had small bedrooms that eight girls (of the same age group) slept in together. The classrooms were two large rooms, separated by a wooden divider that could be moved to form one big room. There were numerous parks and play areas for the children. In 1892 the school started to offer classes in sewing, type writing and music. The teachers and superintendents had separate living quarters from the students with rooms that slightly resemble each other.

=== Samuel Ready ===
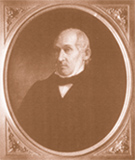
March 8, 1789 – November 28, 1871

Samuel Ready was born on March 8, 1789, in southeastern Baltimore County. In 1804 he was employed at a sail-making firm. In 1808 Ready traveled to Washington, D.C. and worked in a government navy yard. In 1812 Ready returned to Baltimore and served in the war. On August 28, 1814, he enlisted in the Sixth Regiment, Maryland Militia. On September 3, 1817, he was appointed Lieutenant of Captain Rawlings' Company in the Twenty-Seventh Regiment, Maryland Militia. Samuel Ready served on the board of elections, and as a business man in real estate and lumber.

Although Samuel Ready had an extensive resume and could have retired at any time, he worked until his death because he loved helping the people. He came up with the idea of the Samuel Ready institution while he was an employee at the Sail Making Firm. While working as a Sail Maker he came across a few female orphans who used to "hang around" the dock. Ready would always engage in conversation with them in order to learn more about their lives. From these conversations he learned about the struggle of the orphans to find a place that felt like home and the lack of education these people were offered and the dangers they encountered in everyday life. This motivated him to create a “safe haven” for the girls and provided them a more promising future. Ready didn't want to just build an orphanage. He wanted to make a place that felt like a home. So in 1864 Ready, set up a plan that created an institution that not only provided orphans with a warm home but also an education. Ready died (at the age of 82) on November 28, 1871, before he could see the opening of the institution. But he was able to leave his estate and money to the school.

== Orphans and scholarships ==
Preceding the death of Samuel Ready, the board of trustees began to work on a scholarship program for female orphans. Between 1887 and 1976 Ready's scholarships were strictly for female orphans. In 1977 the board decided to open the Samuel Ready scholarships to all girls who showed strong academic potential and financial instability. Samuel Ready Scholarships Inc. is an organization that provides funds to six independent Baltimore schools those include: The Bryn Mawr School, Friends School, Garrison Forest School, Institute of Notre Dame, Roland Park Country School, and St. Paul's School for Girls.
