= Riverside Historic District (Baltimore, Maryland) =

Historic district in Maryland, United States

- U.S. National Register of Historic Places
- U.S. Historic district
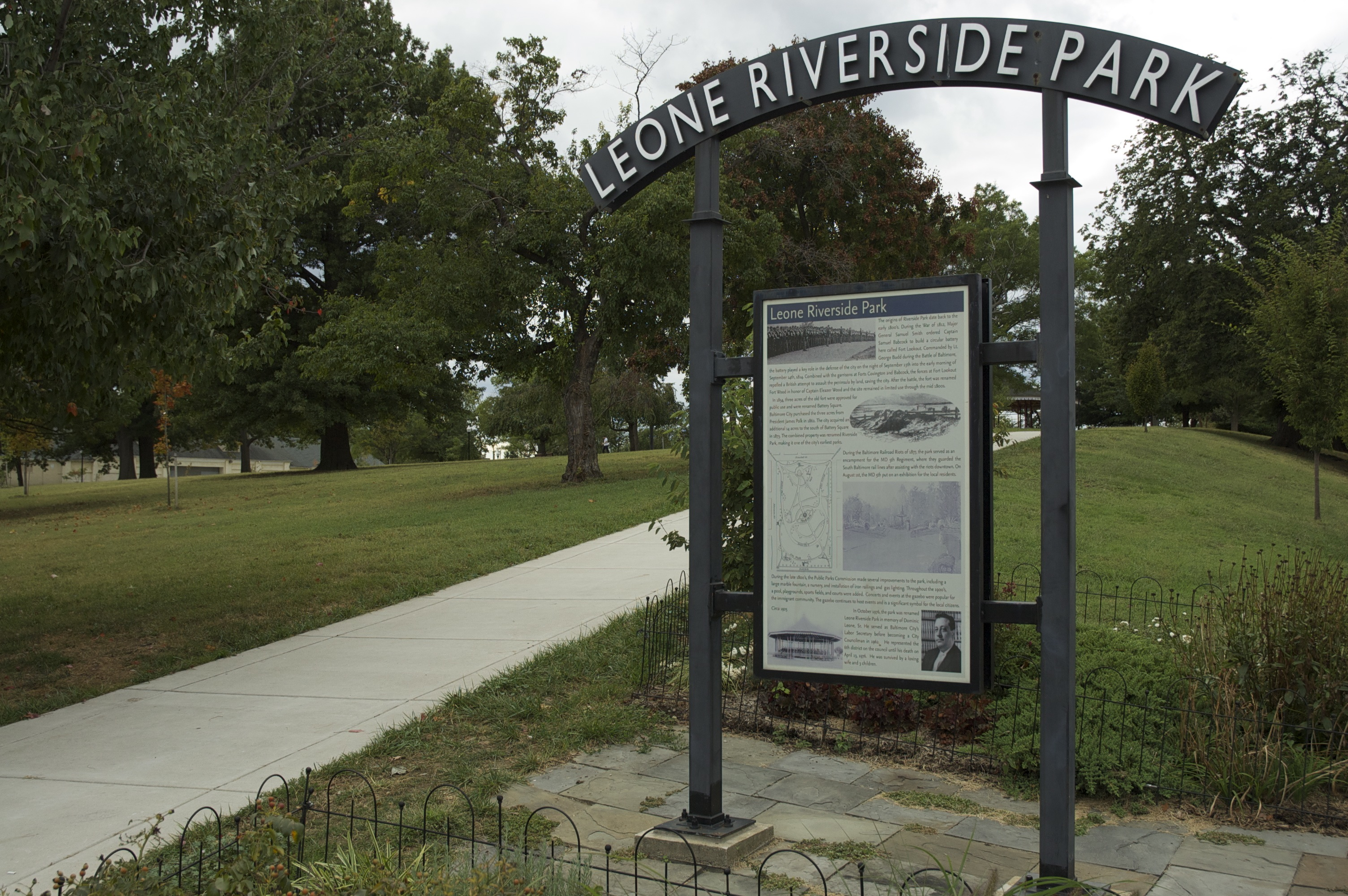
- The main entrance to Riverside Park

- Location within Baltimore Location within Maryland Location within the United States
- Location: Bounded by Race St from W. S to Winder, E. to Webster, N. to Heath, E. to Boyle & N. to Fort then W. to Marshall..., Baltimore, Maryland
- Coordinates: 39°16′13″N 76°36′33″W
- Area: 190 acres (77 ha)
- Built: 1845-1910
- Built by: Multiple Builders
- Architectural style: Greek Revival, Late Victorian
- NRHP reference No.: 08000358
- Added to NRHP: April 30, 2008

The Riverside Historic District is a national historic district located in southwest Baltimore, Maryland. It encompasses 1,997 contributing buildings between Federal Hill and Locust Point. The district includes notable examples of Greek Revival and Late Victorian style architecture. It was added to the National Register of Historic Places in 2008.

== Trivia ==
- Scenes from the Alfred Hitchcock film Marnie were shot in Riverside on Sanders Street where it intersects with Riverside Avenue.
