= Ashburton, Baltimore =

Ashburton
- neighborhood statistical area
- Location within Baltimore
- Coordinates: 39°19′37″N 76°40′28″W
- Country: United States
- State: Maryland
- City: Baltimore

Area
  - Total: 0.450 sq mi (1.17 km^{2})
  - Land: 0.450 sq mi (1.17 km^{2})

Population (2009)
  - Total: 2,446
  - Density: 5,440/sq mi (2,100/km^{2})
- Time zone: UTC-5 (Eastern)
  - Summer (DST): UTC-4 (EDT)
- ZIP code: 21215
- Area code: 410, 443, and 667

Ashburton is a middle class, predominantly African-American neighborhood in the Forest Park region of northwestern Baltimore City, Maryland. It is located near Liberty Heights Avenue and Hilton Street, and is characterized by mixture of single family housing and blocks of row houses. Construction began in 1920 on a farm owned by the prominent Gittings family of Baltimore, who were among the largest real estate holders in the city. It originally had covenants that could in-effect restrict Jews and blacks from owning homes, but these discriminatory practices were overturned by the state in 1929, and the community diversified, eventually becoming a bastion for prominent black professionals and politicians. The neighborhood is often described as suburban in character with stately homes, large lawns, slate roofs and mature trees.

== History ==
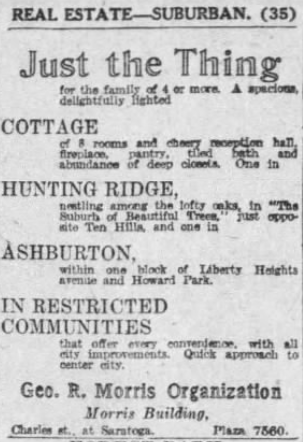
An April 11, 1925, advertisement in the Baltimore Sun for racially restricted houses in Ashburton.

The 120-acre rural farm property was part of the Gittings family estate known as Ashburton, established by John Sterett Gittings (1798-1879). The farm had been in the Gittings family since the early 19th century, and over the next century was a residence of prominent family members that included a Treasurer of Maryland, a member of the Maryland House of Delegates, heads of banks, foreign diplomats, directors of various railroad companies, city commissioners. The Gittings were among the largest real estate holders in the city and the farm was their family estate.

In 1920, John Sterett Gittings (1848-1926) decided to sell the farm; 120 of the 190 acres were purchased by George R. Morris, a well known and prolific developer in Baltimore. By January 1924, 270 lots were sold. By 1928, the majority of houses were built, and by 1952 all but a few lots were completed. In the center of the development was the 1-acre lot of the estate of the Gittings family known as Ashburton.

Many new higher end developments in Baltimore, including Ashburton, had covenants that could in-effect restrict buyers, such as Black and Jewish people. The covenants gave community management the power to approve who could buy a home; among prospective home buyers and the management there was an unwritten but understood "gentleman's agreement" that minorities would be excluded. By 1929, the Maryland Court of Appeals found these discriminatory practices to be void. Slowly during the 1930s and 1940s, as the first generation of home buyers moved away, the neighborhood began to diversify as Jewish families began to move in. During the 1960s, Ashburton shifted to a majority African-American community, like most of the West Baltimore, whites were moving to the outer suburbs.

Beginning in the 1960s, Ashburton was home to many prominent African Americans, including former Baltimore mayors Catherine Pugh, Kurt L. Schmoke, State Senator Lisa Gladden, and State Delegate Shawn Z. Tarrant. Benjamin Jealous, former NAACP president and chief executive officer, traveled as a child from northern California to spend his summers here with his maternal grandparents. Former Baltimore mayor Stephanie Rawlings-Blake, former Clerk of the Court Frank M. Conaway Sr., and attorney Dwight Pettit grew up in this neighborhood as children. Civil Rights activist, Walter P. Carter moved his family to Ashburton in 1965. His daughter, State Senator Jill P. Carter grew up there and represents the area as senator for Maryland Legislative District 41. The Carter family retains the family home on Egerton Road.

== See also ==
- List of Baltimore neighborhoods
